= South Loop =

Neighborhood in Chicago, Illinois, United States

Dearborn Station is a historic landmark in South Loop

South Loop is a Chicago neighborhood south of the Loop. The South Branch of the Chicago River flows through it. Chinatown is adjacent to the southwest, and Museum Campus is to its east. University Village and Pilsen are to the west. South Loop is part of the Near South Side community area of Chicago.

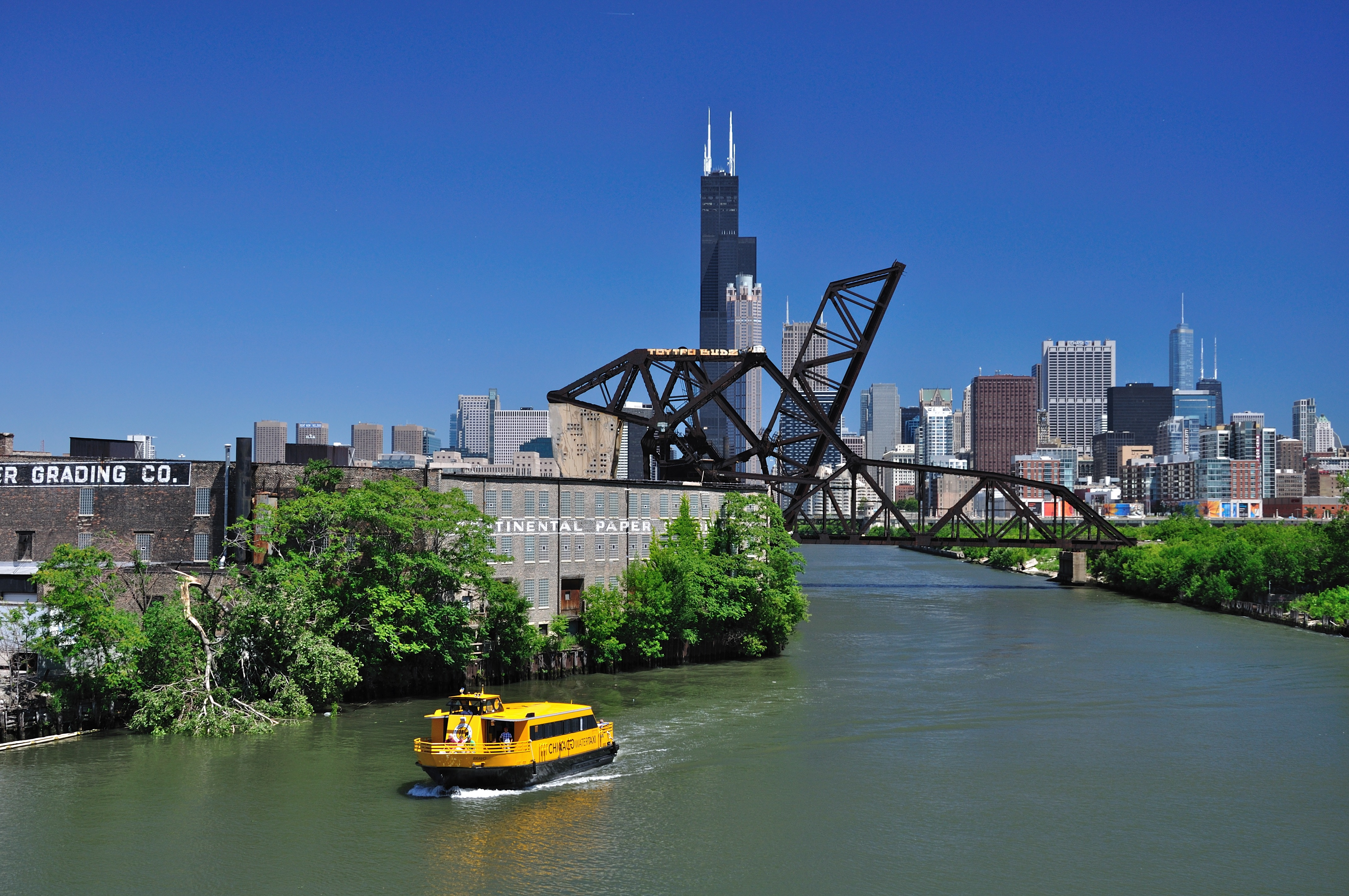
St. Charles Air Line Bridge is a remnant of the area's industrial past.

Sites listed in the National Register of Historic Places in South Loop include: Printing House Row District, South Loop Printing House District, and Dearborn Station. The railroad track area behind Dearborn Station was redeveloped into the Dearborn Park neighborhood.

== Location ==
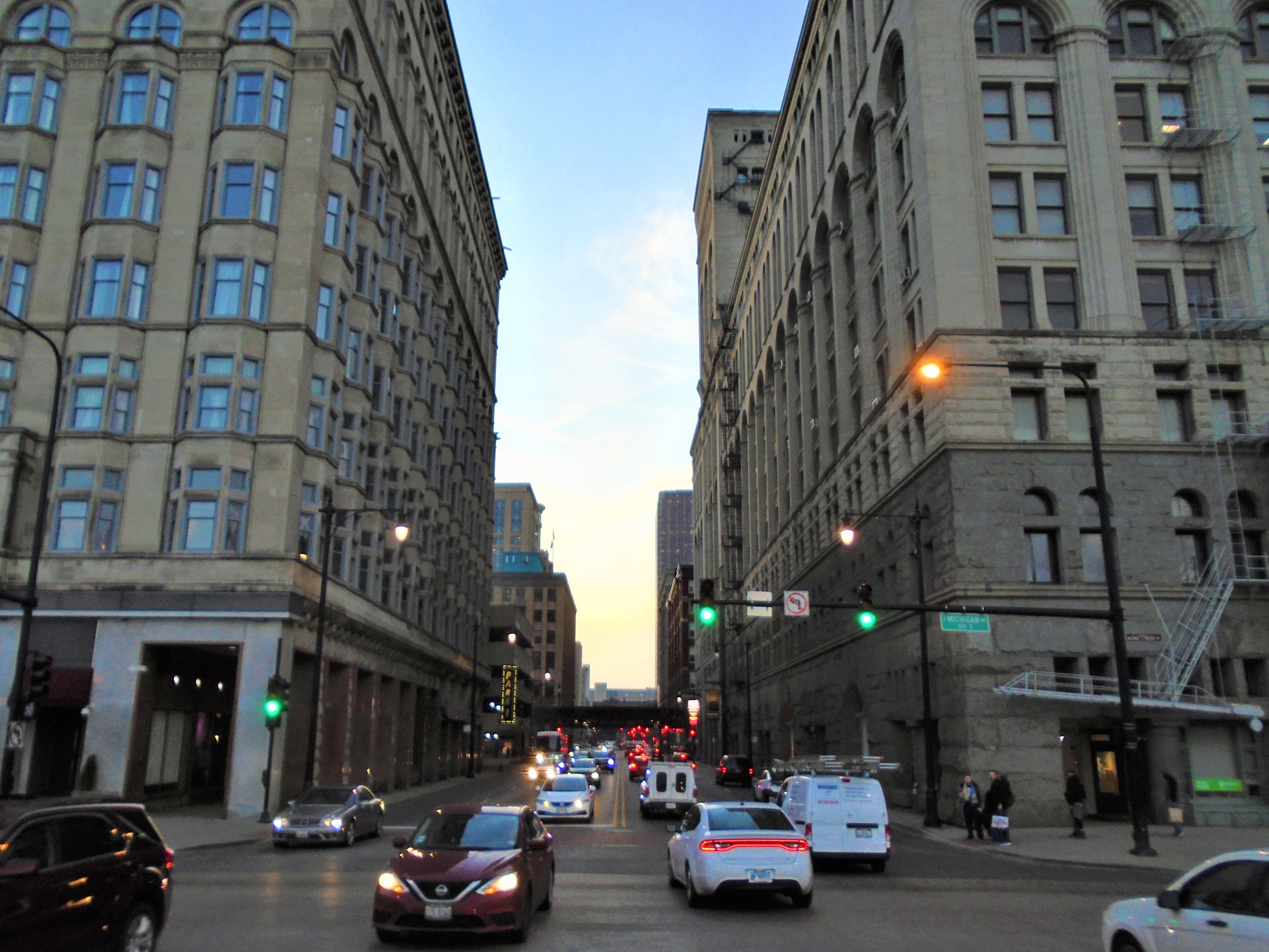
Ida B. Wells Drive is the northern boundary of the neighborhood.

The exact boundaries of South Loop are not precisely defined. Its southern boundary abutting Bronzeville can be considered Cermak Road (22nd Street), or as far south as 26th Street. Its northern boundary abutting the Loop is Ida B. Wells Drive, or slightly farther north at Van Buren Street.

The Greater South Loop Association, a not-for-profit neighborhood association, promotes the interests of residents and businesses of a larger area bounded by Ida B. Wells Drive on the North, the Stevenson Expressway on the South, Lake Michigan including Northerly Island on the east, and the Dan Ryan Expressway on the west.

== Development ==
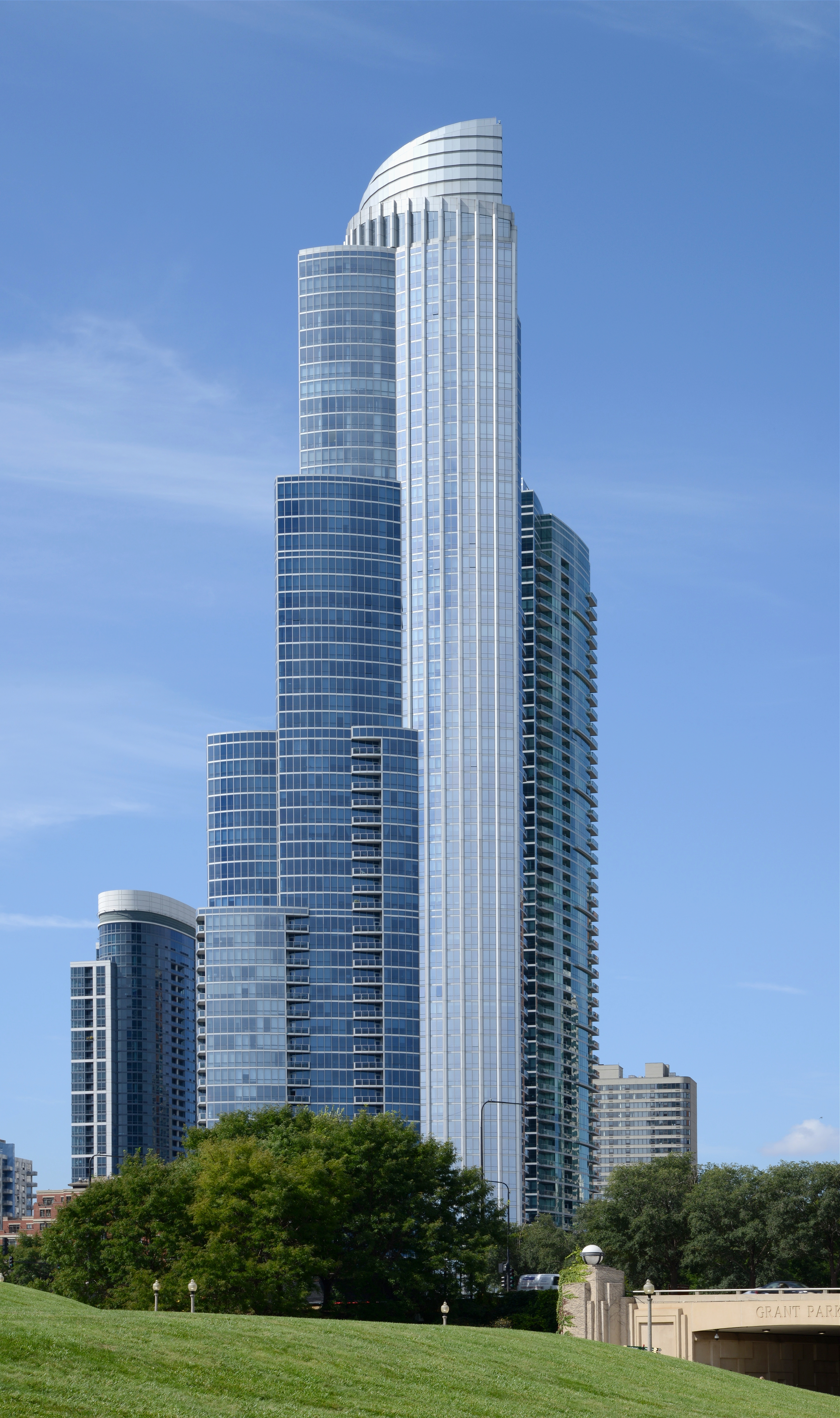
One Museum Park is a residential skyscraper built as part of Central Station in South Loop

South Loop includes former railyards that have been redeveloped as microneighborhoods, such as Dearborn Park and Central Station. Former warehouses and factory lofts have been converted to residential buildings, while new townhouses and highrises have been developed on vacant or underused land. Dearborn Station at the south end of South Loop Printing House District has been converted to retail and office space, and is the oldest train station still standing in Chicago. Columbia College Chicago is a major real estate holder in the South Loop, owning 17 buildings.

River City is a mixed-use building at 800 South Wells Street completed in 1986 designed by Bertrand Goldberg, sharing elements with his design for Marina City.

The Chicago Fire Football Club is building a $650 million soccer stadium in the South Loop on vacant land known as The 78. The 22,000-seat open-air stadium, McDonald's Park, is expected to be completed before the 2028 Major League Soccer season. Chicago Fire FC chose Pepper Construction, GMA Construction Group and ALL Construction Group to build the new stadium.

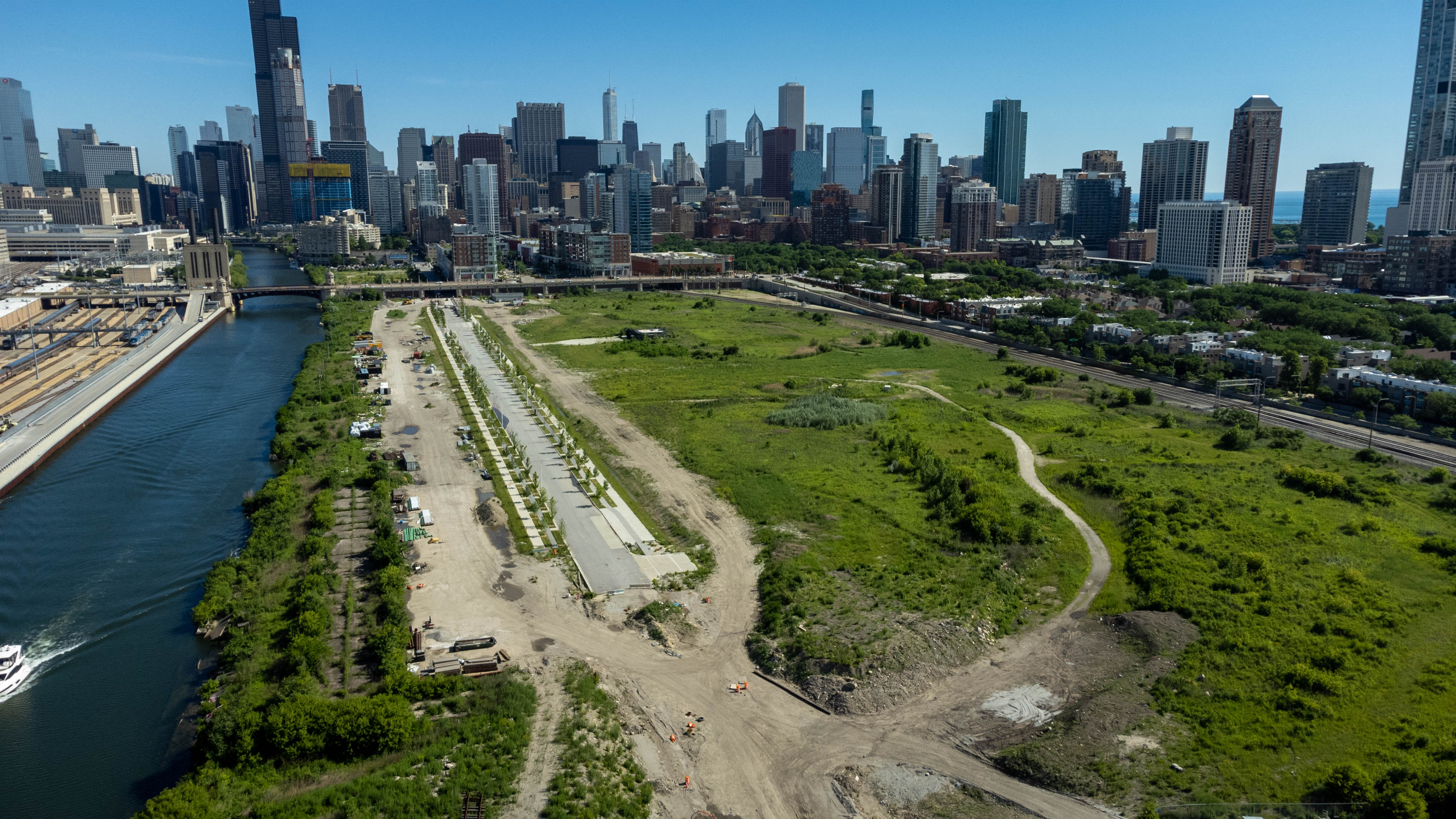
The 78 is under development to host Chicago Fire FC at McDonald's Park.

== Education ==
Jones College Prep High School is a selective enrollment prep school drawing students from the entire city. South Loop Elementary School, a Chicago Public Schools magnet cluster school which accepts students who live within the neighborhood boundaries, opened at 1212 S. Plymouth Court in 1988.

== Parks and recreation ==
Chicago Women's Park and Gardens is a 3.23 acre public sculpture garden that honors the contributions of women throughout the history of Chicago.

Southbank Riverwalk is a 2.5-acre park and quarter-mile public pathway along the Chicago River between Harrison Street and the River City Apartments along the river's south branch.

Fred Anderson Park is a 1.2-acre community space in South Loop located at 1611 S. Wabash Ave. Named after the celebrated Chicago jazz saxophonist Fred Anderson, it is known for its dog-friendly areas, featuring synthetic turf, splash pools, separate zones for large/small dogs, and daily hours from 6:00 AM to 11:00 PM.

McDonald's Park is a soccer-specific stadium under construction to be the future home of Chicago Fire FC of Major League Soccer.

Coliseum Park is a 0.75-acre neighborhood park in South Loop named after the historic Chicago Coliseum (1900–1982). The former arena hosted political conventions, early hockey and basketball games, roller derby, and 1960s rock concerts by acts like The Doors and the Grateful Dead. The Chicago Park District acquired the parcel in 2000, creating a green space that pays tribute to the neighborhood's entertainment history.

== History ==
The South Loop was historically home to Chicago's vice districts, including the brothels, bars, burlesque theaters, and arcades. Inexpensive residential hotels on Van Buren and State Street made it one of the city's Skid Rows until the 1970s. The oldest homeless shelter in the city, Pacific Garden Mission, was located at State and Balbo from 1923 to 2007, bit was relocated to 1458 S. Canal St. on the other side of the south branch of the Chicago River to make room for Jones College Prep. The Site of the John and Mary Jones House was located at what is now the corner of Plymouth Court and 9th Street, and the nearby Jones Park at 13th Street and Plymouth Court was renamed in 2005. Chicago Firehouse Restaurant was built in 1905 in Romanesque Revival style to house Engine Company 104 of the Chicago Fire Department on Michigan Avenue in South Loop.

== See also ==
- Chicago Loop
- Near South Side, Chicago
- Printers Row
- Prairie Avenue District
- South Loop Printing House District
- Motor Row District
