= Printers Row Park =

Park in Chicago, Illinois, United States

Coordinates: 41.8734°N 87.6294°W

Printers Row Park is a 0.38 acre public park in Printers Row, Chicago. Printers Row Park was formerly named Park No. 543. In summer, it hosts a farmer's market.
