= Chicago Firehouse Restaurant =

Restaurant in South Loop, Chicago

Chicago Firehouse Restaurant was built in 1905 in Romanesque Revival style to house Engine Company 104 of the Chicago Fire Department on Michigan Avenue in South Loop. It functioned as a firehouse until 1987, opened as a restaurant in 2000, and was designated a historic Chicago landmark in 2003. Due to a roof fire, it was closed for repairs December 10, 2014 through February 3, 2017.
