= Printers Row =

Neighborhood in Chicago, Illinois

Coordinates: 41.8735°N 87.6292°W

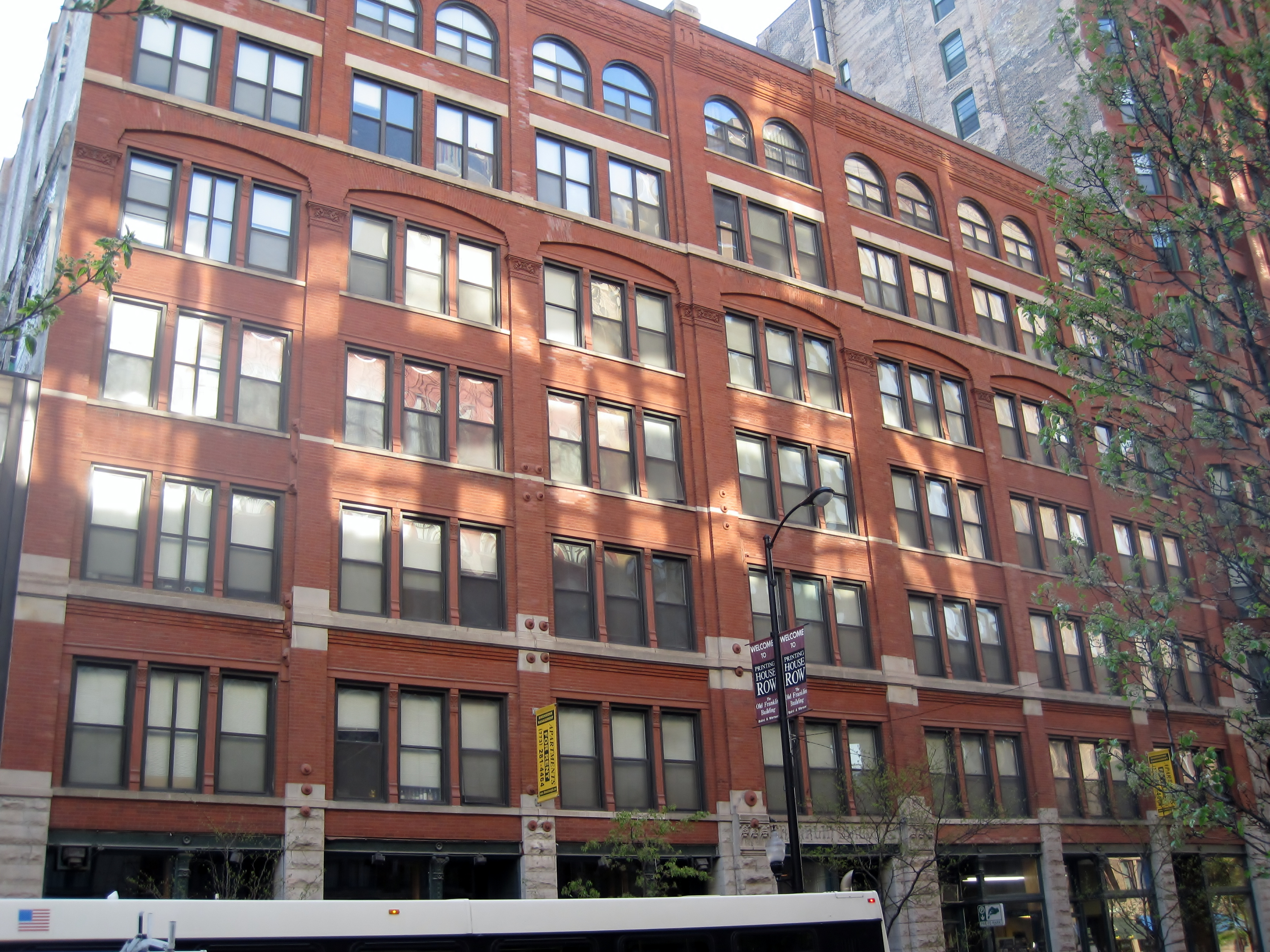
Franklin Building built in 1886

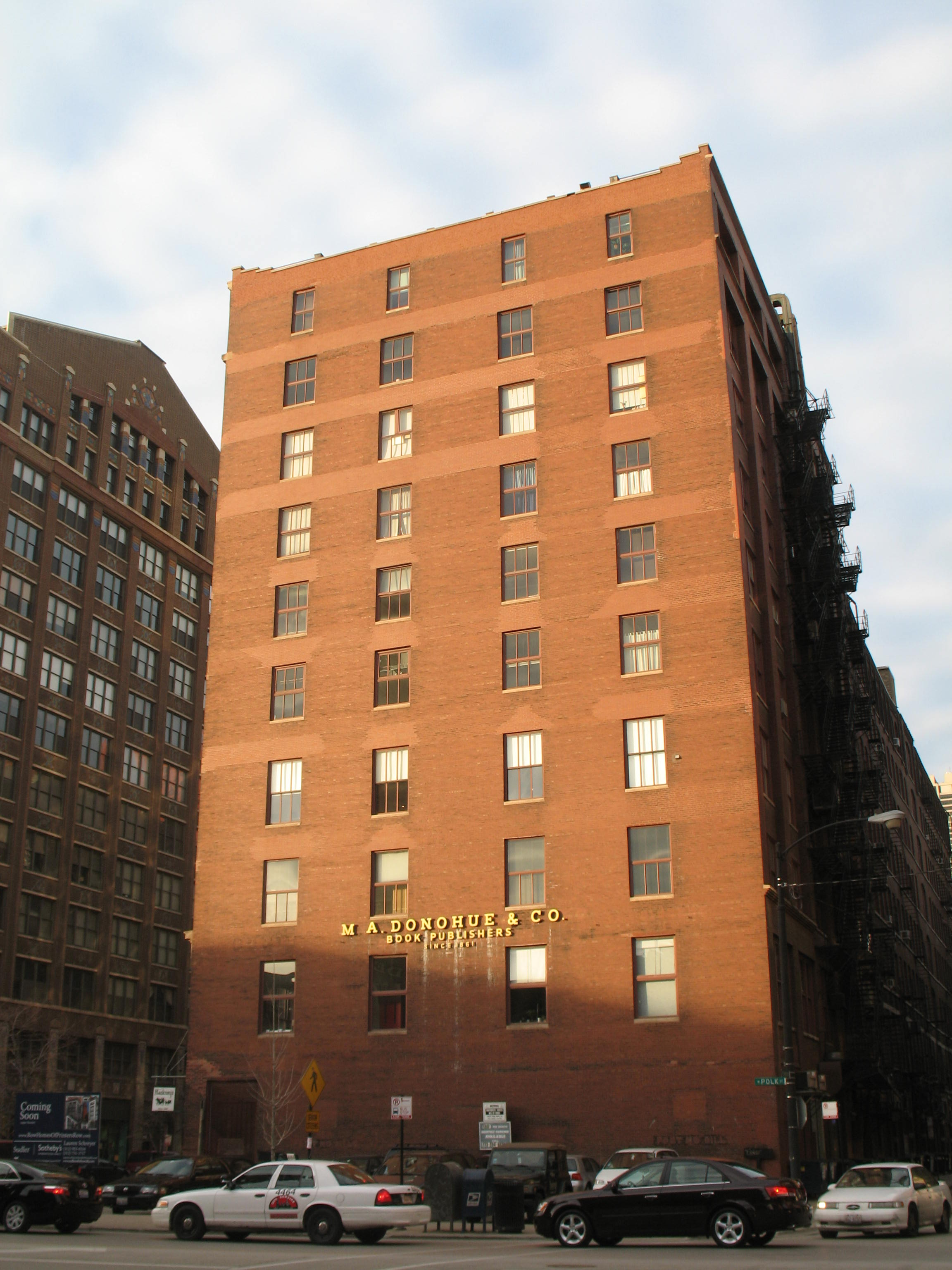
M.A. Donohue & Co. Building at Plymouth Court and Polk Street

Printers Row is a Chicago neighborhood located in South Loop. The area of Printers Row is generally defined by Ida B. Wells Drive on the north, Polk Street on the south, Plymouth Court on the east, and the Chicago River on the west. This neighborhood overlaps significantly with the officially designated landmark Printing House Row District to the north of Ida B Wells Drive and the South Loop Printing House District to the south of the Drive. The neighborhood includes Dearborn Station, which is also on the National Register of Historic Places.

Many of the buildings in this area were used by printing and publishing businesses. Today, the buildings have mainly been converted into residential lofts. Palmer Printing, Inc., near the corner of Clark and Polk streets, sold to residential developers in early 2018. Dupli-Group, a family-owned printer operating since the WWII era, continues to operate in the neighborhood.

== History ==
Publishing activity in the area now known as Printers Row predates the neighborhood's name. John Calhoun published the Chicago Democrat, the city's first newspaper, from a shop in the area in 1833. By 1861 there were 29 publishing houses in the district, and the opening of Dearborn Station in 1885 accelerated the neighborhood's growth as a center of the printing trade. Raw materials arrived through the station and finished books, newspapers, and magazines left through it.

From 1886 until 1922, more than 40 buildings for the printing industry were constructed in the shadow of Dearborn Station, and Chicago became the publishing capital of the Midwest. Major publishers operating in the neighborhood during this era included R.R. Donnelley & Sons, Rand McNally, and M.A. Donohue & Company. The name "Printers Row" first appeared in the Chicago Tribune in 1907.

In the 1960s printing businesses began to relocate to the suburbs, and when Dearborn Station closed in the early 1970s the area entered a rapid decline. Many buildings were left vacant and the neighborhood deteriorated significantly. Concerned citizens, in particular architect Harry Weese, petitioned to protect the historic buildings, and in 1976 succeeded in placing the Printers Row District on the National Register of Historic Places.

Starting in the early 1980s, real estate developers began to see the value in the neighborhood's high-ceiling loft buildings and convenient location on the doorstep of the Loop, converting former printing and publishing facilities into residential lofts. Dearborn Station was redeveloped as an office and retail complex in 1986. In 1996 Printers Row was designated a Chicago Landmark, further protecting the district's historical character. By 2007, only Palmer Printing remained of the area's original printing businesses. In 2018 the company sold its building to a residential developer and relocated to Elk Grove Village.

== Buildings ==
Buildings in the neighborhood include the M.A. Donohue & Co. Building at Plymouth Court and Polk Street, and the red brick and polychromatic tile Franklin Building. It features painted tile depictions of printing tradesmen such as a bookbinder and typesetter as well as a painted tile mural of the "first impression" of the Gutenberg Bible.

When Ida B. Wells Drive, then known as Congress Parkway, was extended west between 1949 and 1952 through the area, it separated what is now the historic buildings of the Printing House Row District from those of the South Loop Printing House District.

== Shops, Dining, and Entertainment ==
Following the neighborhood's residential conversion in the 1980s, Printers Row developed a commercial identity defined largely by independently owned small businesses. The block around South Dearborn Street has resisted the chain retail and franchise dining common in nearby downtown corridors, retaining a hyper-local character shaped by long-term residents and owner-operators.

Several anchor institutions reflect this continuity. Sandmeyer's Bookstore, founded in 1982, was among the first businesses to establish itself during the neighborhood's earliest years of residential development and has operated from the same storefront ever since. A bar has operated continuously at 701 South Dearborn since the 1880s, serving printing industry workers before the neighborhood's decline and residents and visitors ever since. The current establishment, Kasey's Tavern, has operated under that name since 1974. The Jazz Showcase, founded in 1947 by NEA Jazz Master Joe Segal and one of Chicago's oldest jazz clubs, relocated to its current home adjacent to Dearborn Station in 2008.

Today the neighborhood supports a dense mix of independently owned restaurants, bars, coffee shops, and retail alongside a seasonal Saturday farmers market. Printers Row Wine Shop, a neighborhood fixture since 2004, and Flaco's Tacos, which opened its first location in Printers Row in 2008, are among the longer-tenured dining and drinking establishments on the block. Coffee is anchored by the woman-owned Necessary & Sufficient Coffee. Born Again Consignment Parlor, a BIPOC woman-owned resale boutique voted among Chicago Reader's top three resale shops, brings a vintage and secondhand dimension to the block. In recent years, experiential businesses have also joined the neighborhood, including Fox in a Box, an escape room venue housed inside Dearborn Station, and Embers + Apothecary, a Woman- and Black-owned candle-making studio offering hands-on workshops.

== Festivals / Annual Events ==
Printers Row Lit Fest is a free two-day outdoor literary festival held annually along South Dearborn Street between Ida B. Wells Drive and Polk Street. First held in 1985 as the Printers Row Book Fair, it is the largest free outdoor literary event in the Midwest, featuring authors, booksellers, publishers, and programming for readers of all ages. Historically scheduled in early June, the festival has in recent years moved to September.

Printers Row Art Fest, produced by Amdur Productions, is a juried fine art festival held annually in August along South Dearborn Street. The festival features approximately 95 artists from across the country, showcasing painting, photography, sculpture, jewelry, and other media.

== Education ==
Printers Row is zoned to the following Chicago Public Schools campuses: South Loop School and Phillips Academy High School. The campus of Jones College Prep High School is also located near Printers Row at 700 S State Street.

The area is also a student-oriented center with the University Center of Chicago (UCC), housing over 3,000 college students in dorm and apartment style units, as well as Dwight Lofts and 731 South Plymouth Court, two student housing buildings owned by Columbia College Chicago. Colleges in the area include Roosevelt University, Columbia College, UIC Law School, and the Loop campus of DePaul University.

== Transportation ==
Printers Row is served by the Harrison Station on the CTA's Red Line, as well as LaSalle Station on the Blue Line.

== See also ==
- Community areas in Chicago
- M.A. Donohue & Co.
