= Printing House Row District =

Historic district in Illinois, United States

- South Dearborn Street – Printing House Row North Historic District
- U.S. National Register of Historic Places
- U.S. National Historic Landmark District
- Chicago Landmark
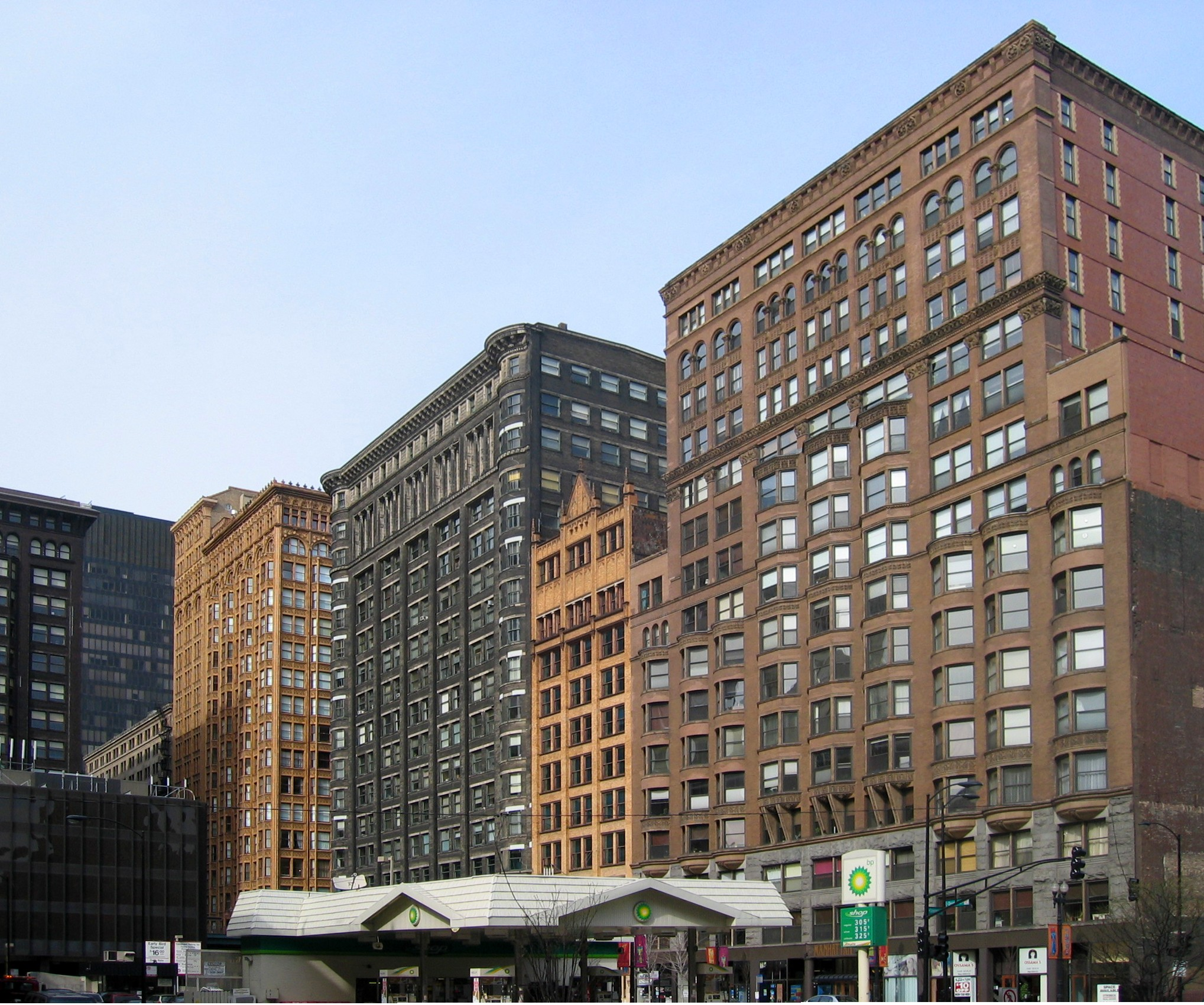
- The Manhattan Building (far right), the Fisher Building (far left), and the Old Colony Building (middle-left), three of the four buildings in the district.

- Location within Chicago metropolitan area Location within Illinois Location within the United States
- Location: S. Dearborn St. Chicago, IL
- Coordinates: 41°52′42.48″N 87°37′41.24″W
- Built: 1889
- Architect: Multiple
- Architectural style: Chicago
- NRHP reference No.: 76000705

Significant dates
- Added to NRHP: January 7, 1976
- Designated NHLD: January 7, 1976
- Designated CHICL: May 9, 1996

The Printing House Row District is a National Historic Landmark District encompassing four architecturally important buildings on South Dearborn Street, between Jackson Boulevard (300 S.) and Ida B. Wells Drive (500 S., formerly Congress Parkway), in the Loop community area of Chicago, Illinois. It was listed on the National Register of Historic Places as South Dearborn Street – Printing House Row Historic District and listed as a National Historic Landmark as South Dearborn Street – Printing House Row North Historic District on January 7, 1976. The district includes the Monadnock Building, the Manhattan Building, the Fisher Building, and the Old Colony Building.

The district overlaps with the Printers Row neighborhood and with the South Loop Printing House District. It is adjacent to and just north of a similarly designated Printing House Row District that spans the 500 through 800 blocks of South Dearborn, South Federal and South Plymouth streets and that was declared a Chicago Landmark on May 9, 1996.

== Description ==
The Printing House Row District includes four buildings that present facades onto South Dearborn Street, between West Jackson Boulevard and West Ida B. Wells Drive. At the northern end stands the Monadnock Building, occupying the entire block of South Dearborn and South Federal between Jackson and Van Buren. Opposite the southern portion of the Monadnock stands the Fisher Building, fronting on South Dearborn and Van Buren. Across Van Buren on the east side of South Dearborn is the Old Colony Building, with the Manhattan Building to its south.

Each of these buildings is significant for its architecture and/or for advances in skyscraper construction methods in the 1880s and 1890s. The Manhattan Building, built in 1889–91 to a design by William Le Baron Jenney, was the first skyscraper supported entirely by an internal metal skeleton, and was the tallest building in the world at its completion. The Old Colony Building, built in 1893–94 to a design by Holabird & Roche, demonstrated a means to build skyscrapers on narrow lots, yet provided sufficient strength to its floors to withstand the operational stresses of printing equipment. The Fisher Building, built in 1895–96 to a design by Daniel H. Burnham, is one of the first buildings to use curtain wall construction. Lastly, the Monadnock, built in two stages, one designed by Burnham & Root and the other by Holabird & Roche, is one of the largest commercial buildings with load-bearing masonry walls ever built.

== See also ==
- List of National Historic Landmarks in Illinois
- National Register of Historic Places listings in Central Chicago
