= Fisher Building (Chicago) =

Apartment building in Chicago, Illinois

- U.S. National Register of Historic Places
- U.S. National Historic Landmark District – Contributing property
- Chicago Landmark
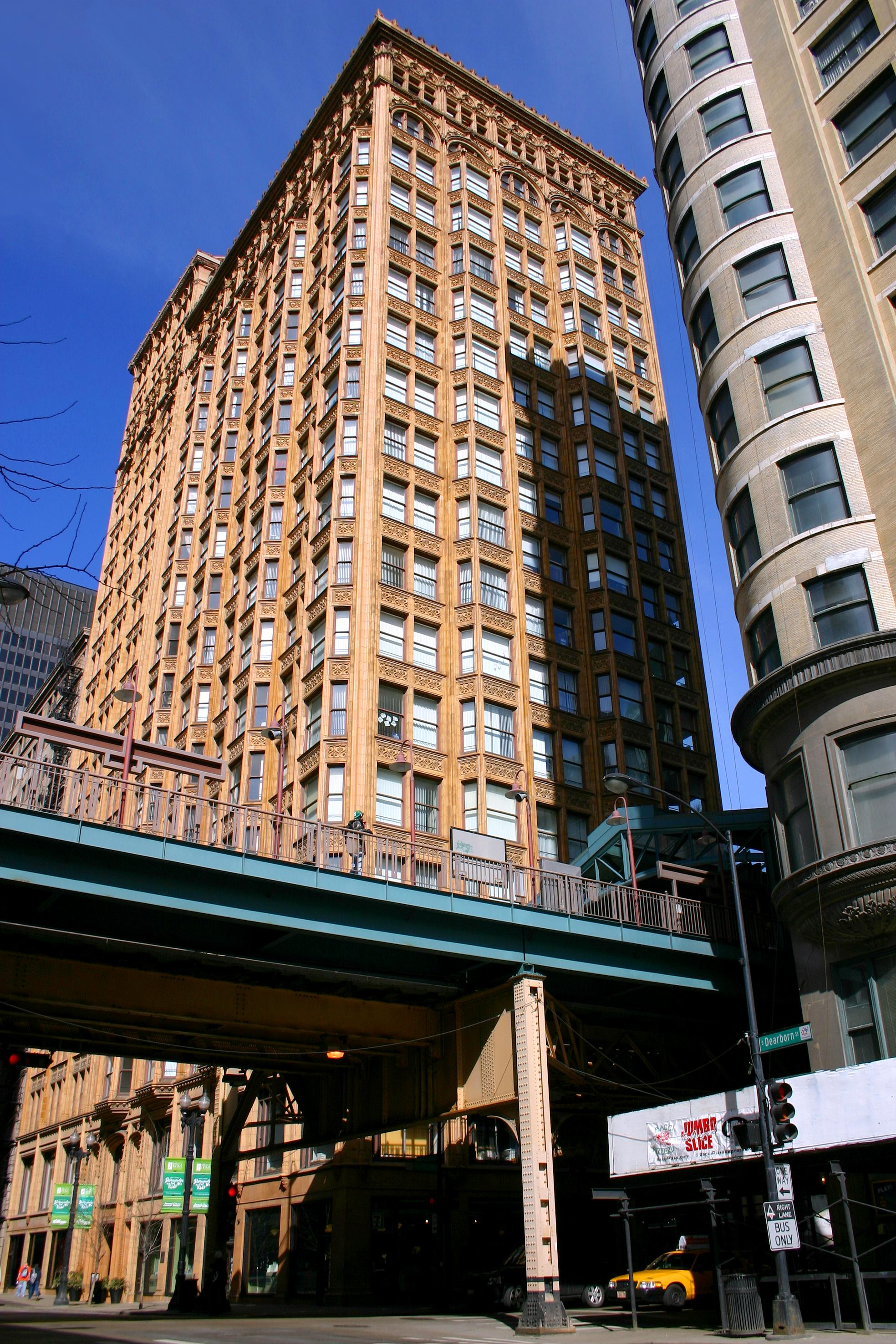
- The Chicago 'L' is sandwiched between the Fisher Building and the Old Colony Building

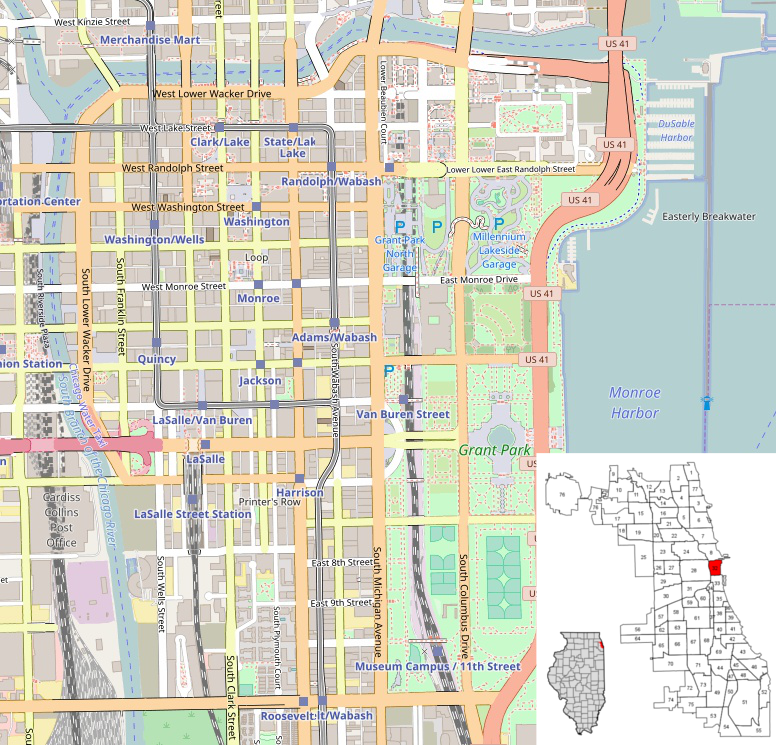
- Location within Chicago Loop
- Location: Chicago
- Coordinates: 41°52′37.28″N 87°37′44.01″W
- Built: 1895—1896
- Architects: D.H. Burnham & Company; Atwood, Charles
- Architectural style: Chicago
- Part of: South Dearborn Street – Printing House Row North Historic District (ID76000705)
- NRHP reference No.: 76000691
- Added to NRHP: March 16, 1976

The Fisher Building is 20-story, 275-foot-tall (84 m) neo-Gothic landmark building located at 343 South Dearborn Street in the Chicago Loop community area of Chicago. Commissioned by paper magnate Lucius Fisher, the original building was completed in 1896 by D.H. Burnham & Company with an addition later added in 1907.

Scholar Thomas Leslie says that there are good reasons to consider the Fisher Building the first modern skyscraper, though it is a complex question.

== History ==
At the time of its completion, the building was one of two buildings in Chicago that was 18 stories or greater, the other being the Masonic Building (which was 21 stories tall). To this day, the Fisher Building is the oldest 18 story building in Chicago that has not been demolished. The Masonic Temple, while taller and older, was demolished in 1939.

The original structure was designed by Charles B. Atwood of D.H. Burnham & Company. In 1906, an addition on the northern side of the building raised it from 18 to 20 stories. A former employee of the Burnham firm, Peter J. Weber, designed and oversaw the building's addition which was completed in 1907.

The Fisher Building features terra-cotta carvings of various aquatic creatures including fish and crabs. In addition, there are eagles, dragons and mythical creatures depicted on the facade as well.

The building houses apartments on floors 3–20 and commercial stores on the first and second floors.

The Fisher Building was designated a Chicago Landmark on June 7, 1978, and was added to the National Register of Historic Places on March 16, 1976.

== Notable Tenants (Past and Present) ==
The main headquarters of the C.A. Dunham Company used to occupy the Fisher Building for most of the 20th Century. Dunham was the inventor of the thermostatic steam trap for use on radiator (heating) equipment, and a pioneer in the development of steam heating systems. As time went on, they merged with the Bush Manufacturing Company to become the Dunham-Bush Company. Later they purchased the Warren-Webster Company, another steam heating pioneer. Eventually the steam heating division was sold off to become Marshall Engineered Products Company or MEPCO.

The building is currently host to Wheeler Kearns Architects and to numerous members of staff teaching at University of Illinois at Chicago and other institutions.
