= Wells Street =

Wells Street may refer to:

- Wells Street (City of Westminster), London, England
- Wells Street (Chicago), Illinois, United States
  - Wells Street Bridge (Chicago)
  - Wells Street Gallery
  - Wells Street Station
  - Wells Street Terminal
- Wells Street Bridge (Fort Wayne, Indiana), United States
