= South Loop Printing House District =

Historic district in Illinois, United States

- U.S. National Register of Historic Places
- U.S. Historic district
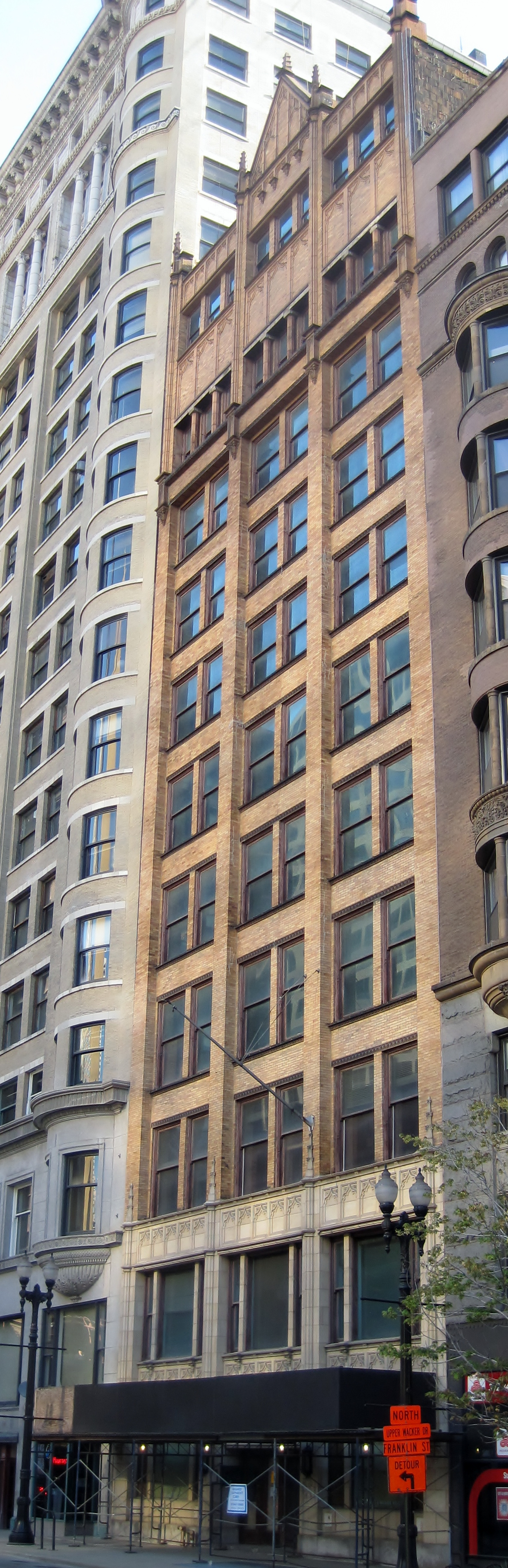

- Location within Chicago metropolitan area Location within Illinois Location within the United States
- Location: Roughly bounded by Taylor, Polk, Wells, Congress and State Sts., Chicago, Illinois
- Coordinates: 41°52′26″N 87°37′51″W
- Architectural style: Chicago
- NRHP reference No.: 78001130
- Added to NRHP: March 2, 1978

South Loop Printing House District is a historic district in the South Loop area of Chicago, Illinois. The district is roughly bounded by Ida B. Wells (formerly Congress), Polk, State, Taylor, and Wells Streets and includes 28 contributing buildings. The district includes many of the printing buildings used by Chicago's printing industry, the largest in the midwest from the 1880s through the 1930s. Due to its proximity to Dearborn Station and its thin property blocks that allowed for tall and thin printing buildings, land in the district was attractive to large printing companies. The district includes a small number of large and detailed buildings and many more small, homogeneous buildings used by less prominent printing firms.

It was listed on the National Register of Historic Places in 1978. It is distinct from the Printing House Row District (also known as South Dearborn Street-Printing House Row Historic District), another district which includes significant buildings from Chicago's printing industry. Properties included in the district that are separately listed on the National Register include the Pontiac Building and the Manhattan Building.

== See also ==
- Printing House Row District — also in Central Chicago.
