= National Register of Historic Places listings in Central Chicago =

Currently there are 124 properties listed on the National Register of Historic Places in Central Chicago, out of more than 350 listings in the City of Chicago. Central Chicago includes 3 of the 77 well-defined community areas of Chicago: the historic business and cultural center of Chicago known as the Loop, as well as the Near North Side and the Near South Side. The combined area is bounded by Lake Michigan on the east, the Chicago River on the west, North Avenue (1600 N.) on the north, and 26th Street (2600 S.) on the south. This area runs 5.25 miles (8.45 km) from north to south and about 1.5 miles (2.4 km) from east to west.

The Chicago central city area includes many early classic skyscrapers of the Chicago School of Architecture, such as Burnham and Root's Monadnock and the Reliance Buildings, as well as buildings from the early Modernist period, such as Ludwig Mies van der Rohe's IBM Building and 860–880 Lake Shore Drive Apartments. Chicago's earliest surviving building, the Henry B. Clarke House (built c. 1836) is on the Near South Side, close to the Prairie Avenue District of residential Chicago architecture. Architect Louis Sullivan's work is represented by the Carson, Pirie, Scott and Company Building, and Auditorium Building. Though Frank Lloyd Wright worked downtown first as an assistant to Sullivan (including work on the Auditorium and James Charnley House) and then in his own firm - his major remaining work in the central city is represented only by his well regarded renovation of the lobby of the Root and Burnham's Rookery Building.

At least three sites relate to the city's role in nationwide retailing. Included also are several religious buildings, six hotels, and four theaters.

This National Park Service list is complete through NPS recent listings posted November 13, 2026.

	NRHP-listed
^{∞}	NRHP-listed Historic district
*	National Historic Landmark and NRHP-listed
^{∞}	National Historic Landmark and NRHP-listed Historic district

== Current listings ==
	Name on the Register	Image	Date listed	Location	Neighborhood	Description
1	Adler Planetarium	Adler Planetarium	February 27, 1987 (#87000819)	1300 S. Lake Shore Drive; 41°51′58″N 87°36′24″W	Near South Side	Built in 1930
2	America Fore Building	America Fore Building	June 21, 2016 (#16000383)	844 N. Rush Street; 41°53′53″N 87°37′34″W	Near North Side	
3	Auditorium Building, Roosevelt University	Auditorium Building, Roosevelt University	April 17, 1970 (#70000230)	430 S. Michigan Avenue; 41°52′32″N 87°37′29″W	Chicago Loop	Built in 1889
4	B.F. Goodrich Company Showroom	B.F. Goodrich Company Showroom	May 28, 2009 (#09000347)	1925 S. Michigan Avenue; 41°51′21″N 87°37′24″W	Near South Side	
5	Balaban and Katz Chicago Theatre	Balaban and Katz Chicago Theatre	June 6, 1979 (#79000822)	175 N. State Street; 41°53′08″N 87°37′38″W	Chicago Loop	Built in 1921
6	Blackstone Hotel	Blackstone Hotel	May 8, 1986 (#86001005)	80 E. Balbo Drive; 41°52′24″N 87°37′28″W	Chicago Loop	Built in 1910
7	Boyce Building	Boyce Building	February 29, 1996 (#96000080)	500–510 N. Dearborn Street; 41°53′28″N 87°37′48″W	Near North Side	
8	Buckingham Building	Buckingham Building	August 10, 2000 (#00000942)	63 E. Van Buren Street; 41°52′36″N 87°37′30″W	Chicago Loop	
9	Building at 14–16 Pearson Street	Building at 14–16 Pearson Street	May 8, 1980 (#80001343)	14–16 E. Pearson Street; 41°53′51″N 87°37′40″W	Near North Side	
10	Building at 257 East Delaware Place	Building at 257 East Delaware Place	June 26, 1987 (#87001113)	257 E. Delaware Place; 41°53′57″N 87°37′10″W	Near North Side	
11	Buildings at 860–880 N. Lake Shore Drive	Buildings at 860–880 N. Lake Shore Drive	August 28, 1980 (#80001344)	860–880 N. Lake Shore Drive; 41°53′55″N 87°37′08″W	Near North Side	Built in 1949
12	Burlingham Building	Burlingham Building	February 14, 1985 (#85000264)	104 W. Oak Street; 41°54′04″N 87°37′54″W	Near North Side	
13	Bush Temple of Music	Bush Temple of Music	December 31, 2013 (#13001001)	100 W. Chicago Avenue, 800 N. Clark Street; 41°53′49″N 87°37′54″W	Near North Side	
14	Calumet Plant, R. R. Donnelly & Sons Company	Calumet Plant, R. R. Donnelly & Sons Company	February 17, 1983 (#83000308)	350 E. Cermak Road; 41°51′13″N 87°37′05″W	Near South Side	
15	Carling Hotel	Carling Hotel	January 24, 2017 (#100000563)	1512 N. LaSalle Street; 41°54′35″N 87°38′01″W	Near North Side	
16	Carson, Pirie, Scott and Company Building	Carson, Pirie, Scott and Company Building	April 17, 1970 (#70000231)	1 S. State Street; 41°52′54″N 87°37′39″W	Chicago Loop	Now occupied by a Target department store
17	Chapin and Gore Building	Chapin and Gore Building	June 27, 1979 (#79000823)	63 E. Adams Street; 41°52′45″N 87°37′31″W	Chicago Loop	
18	James Charnley House	James Charnley House	April 17, 1970 (#70000232)	1365 N. Astor Street; 41°54′28″N 87°37′40″W	Near North Side	
19	Chicago Avenue Water Tower and Pumping Station	Chicago Avenue Water Tower and Pumping Station	April 23, 1975 (#75000644)	806 N. Michigan Avenue; 41°53′50″N 87°37′26″W	Near North Side	Includes the Chicago Water Tower and Chicago Avenue Pumping Station. Survived the Great Fire of October 1871.
20	Chicago Board of Trade Building	Chicago Board of Trade Building	June 16, 1978 (#78003181)	141 W. Jackson Boulevard; 41°52′41″N 87°37′56″W	Chicago Loop	
21	Chicago Club	Chicago Club	February 28, 2005 (#05000109)	81 E. Van Buren Street; 41°52′37″N 87°37′29″W	Chicago Loop	1929; Granger and Bollenbacher; Romanesque Revival
22	Chicago Federal Center	Chicago Federal Center	March 24, 2011 (#08001165)	Entire block bounded by S. Dearborn Street, W. Jackson Street, S. Clark Street and W. Adams Street and the contiguous half-block east of S. Dearborn Street; 41°52′44″N 87°37′48″W	Chicago Loop	
23	Chicago Harbor Lighthouse	Chicago Harbor Lighthouse	July 19, 1984 (#84000986)	North Breakwater; 41°53′22″N 87°35′26″W	Near North Side	
24	Chicago Public Library, Central Building	Chicago Public Library, Central Building	July 31, 1972 (#72000449)	78 E. Washington Street; 41°53′02″N 87°37′30″W	Chicago Loop	
25	Chicago Savings Bank Building	Chicago Savings Bank Building	September 5, 1975 (#75000645)	7 W. Madison Street; 41°52′54″N 87°37′42″W	Chicago Loop	
26	Chicago Varnish Company Building	Chicago Varnish Company Building	June 14, 2001 (#01000649)	33 W. Kinzie Street; 41°53′20″N 87°37′46″W	Near North Side	
27	Henry B. Clarke House	Henry B. Clarke House	May 6, 1971 (#71000290)	1827 Indiana Avenue; 41°51′26″N 87°37′19″W	Near South Side	
28	Coca Cola Company Building	Coca Cola Company Building	February 22, 1991 (#91000114)	1322–1336 S. Wabash Avenue; 41°51′54″N 87°37′34″W	Near South Side	
29	Continental and Commercial National Bank	Continental and Commercial National Bank	February 14, 2007 (#07000064)	208 S. LaSalle Street; 41°52′45″N 87°37′56″W	Chicago Loop	
30	Conway Building	Conway Building	February 9, 1984 (#84000988)	111 W. Washington Street; 41°52′58″N 87°37′53″W	Chicago Loop	
31	Cook County Criminal Court Building	Cook County Criminal Court Building	November 13, 1984 (#84000281)	54 W. Hubbard Street; 41°53′25″N 87°37′49″W	Near North Side	
32	Crane Company Building	Crane Company Building	January 28, 2002 (#01001538)	836 S. Michigan Avenue; 41°52′14″N 87°37′28″W	Chicago Loop	
33	Curtiss–Wright Aeronautical University Building	Curtiss–Wright Aeronautical University Building	October 16, 2013 (#13000827)	1340 S. Michigan Avenue; 41°51′53″N 87°37′28″W	Near South Side	1929–53 location of African-American aviation school
34	Dearborn Station	Dearborn Station	March 26, 1976 (#76000688)	47 W. Polk Street; 41°52′20″N 87°37′42″W	Chicago Loop	
35	Delaware Building	Delaware Building	July 18, 1974 (#74000749)	36 W. Randolph Street; 41°53′05″N 87°37′45″W	Chicago Loop	
36	Drake Hotel	Drake Hotel	May 8, 1980 (#80001345)	140 E. Walton Street; 41°54′02″N 87°37′27″W	Near North Side	
37	Jean Baptiste Point Du Sable Homesite	Jean Baptiste Point Du Sable Homesite	May 11, 1976 (#76000690)	401 N. Michigan Avenue; 41°53′23″N 87°37′24″W	Near North Side	
38	Emmel Building	Emmel Building	November 13, 1984 (#84000283)	1357 N. Wells Street; 41°54′26″N 87°38′03″W	Near North Side	
39	Fairbanks, Morse and Company Building	Fairbanks, Morse and Company Building	November 16, 1988 (#88002233)	900 S. Wabash Avenue; 41°52′13″N 87°37′34″W	Chicago Loop	
40	Field Museum of Natural History	Field Museum of Natural History	September 5, 1975 (#75000647)	1400 S. Lake Shore Drive; 41°51′59″N 87°37′01″W	Near South Side	
41	Marshall Field Garden Apartments	Marshall Field Garden Apartments	December 17, 1991 (#91001691)	1394 N. Sedgwick Street, 1395 N. Hudson Avenue, 412 W. Evergreen Street and 413 W. Blackhawk Street; 41°54′29″N 87°38′20″W	Near North Side	
42	Fisher Building	Fisher Building	March 16, 1976 (#76000691)	343 S. Dearborn Street; 41°52′37″N 87°37′44″W	Chicago Loop	
43	Fort Dearborn Hotel	Fort Dearborn Hotel	November 12, 1982 (#82000390)	401 S. LaSalle Street; 41°52′36″N 87°37′52″W	Chicago Loop	
44	Fourth Presbyterian Church of Chicago	Fourth Presbyterian Church of Chicago	September 5, 1975 (#75000648)	126 E. Chestnut Street; 41°53′55″N 87°37′28″W	Near North Side	
45	Gage Group-Ascher, Keith, and Gage Buildings	Gage Group-Ascher, Keith, and Gage Buildings	November 14, 1985 (#85002840)	18,24,30 S. Michigan Avenue; 41°52′52″N 87°37′30″W	Chicago Loop	
46	Germania Club	Germania Club	October 22, 1976 (#76000692)	108 W. Germania Place; 41°54′38″N 87°37′57″W	Near North Side	
47	John J. Glessner House	John J. Glessner House	April 17, 1970 (#70000233)	1800 S. Prairie Avenue; 41°51′27″N 87°37′16″W	Near South Side	
48	Gold Coast Historic District	Gold Coast Historic District	January 30, 1978 (#78001121)	Roughly bounded by North Avenue, Lake Shore Drive, Clark and Oak Streets. 41°54′21″N 87°37′41″W	Near North Side	
49	Grant Park	Grant Park	July 21, 1993 (#92001075)	Roughly, from the Chicago River to E. McFetridge Drive at Lake Michigan; 41°52′31″N 87°37′05″W	Chicago Loop	
50	Raymond M. Hilliard Center Historic District	Raymond M. Hilliard Center Historic District	September 13, 1999 (#99001072)	Jct. of Cermak Road and S. State Street; 41°51′15″N 87°36′59″W	Near South Side	
51	Holy Name Cathedral	Holy Name Cathedral	May 25, 2000 (#00000477)	735 N. State Street; 41°53′46″N 87°37′40″W	Near North Side	
52	Hotel St. Benedict Flats	Hotel St. Benedict Flats	September 1, 1995 (#88003311)	801 N. Wabash Avenue; 41°53′49″N 87°37′35″W	Near North Side	
53	IBM Building	IBM Building	March 11, 2010 (#09000166)	330 N. Wabash Avenue; 41°53′19″N 87°37′39″W	Near North Side	
54	Inland Steel Building	Inland Steel Building	February 18, 2009 (#09000024)	30 W. Monroe Street; 41°52′51″N 87°37′44″W	Chicago Loop	
55	Jewelers' Building	Jewelers' Building	August 7, 1974 (#74000752)	17 S. Wabash Avenue; 41°52′53″N 87°37′33″W	Chicago Loop	
56	William W. Kimball House	William W. Kimball House	December 9, 1971 (#71000291)	1801 S. Prairie Avenue; 41°51′24″N 87°37′12″W	Near South Side	
57	Lakeside Press Building	Lakeside Press Building	June 23, 1976 (#76000694)	731 S. Plymouth Court; 41°52′21″N 87°37′42″W	Chicago Loop	
58	Bryan Lathrop House	Bryan Lathrop House	February 15, 1974 (#74000753)	120 E. Bellevue Place; 41°54′06″N 87°37′31″W	Near North Side	
59	Victor F. Lawson House YMCA	Victor F. Lawson House YMCA	May 8, 2017 (#100000959)	30 W. Chicago Avenue; 41°53′48″N 87°37′46″W	Near North Side	
60	Leiter II Building	Leiter II Building	January 7, 1976 (#76000695)	401 S. State Street; 41°52′35″N 87°37′39″W	Chicago Loop	
61	Loop Retail Historic District	Loop Retail Historic District	November 27, 1998 (#98001351)	Roughly bounded by Lake Street, Wabash Avenue, Congress Parkway, and State Street; 41°52′52″N 87°37′37″W	Chicago Loop	
62	Ludington Building	Ludington Building	May 8, 1980 (#80001347)	1104 S. Wabash Avenue; 41°52′08″N 87°37′35″W	Chicago Loop	
63	Lumber Exchange Building and Tower Addition	Lumber Exchange Building and Tower Addition	December 6, 2007 (#07001238)	11 S. LaSalle Street; 41°52′54″N 87°37′55″W	Chicago Loop	
64	Albert F. Madlener House	Albert F. Madlener House	October 15, 1970 (#70000234)	4 W. Burton Street; 41°54′35″N 87°37′45″W	Near North Side	
65	Manhattan Building	Manhattan Building	March 16, 1976 (#76000697)	431 S. Dearborn Street; 41°52′34″N 87°37′45″W	Chicago Loop	
66	Marquette Building	Marquette Building	August 17, 1973 (#73000697)	140 S. Dearborn Street; 41°52′48″N 87°37′46″W	Chicago Loop	
67	Marshall Hotel	Marshall Hotel	November 27, 2017 (#100001833)	1232 N. LaSalle Street; 41°54′17″N 87°37′59″W	Near North Side	
68	Marshall Field Company Store	Marshall Field Company Store	June 2, 1978 (#78001123)	111 N. State Street; 41°53′01″N 87°37′37″W	Chicago Loop	
69	Maxwell-Briscoe Automobile Company Showroom	Maxwell-Briscoe Automobile Company Showroom	November 18, 2002 (#02001349)	1737 S. Michigan Avenue; 41°51′36″N 87°37′25″W	Near South Side	
70	Isaac N. Maynard Rowhouses	Isaac N. Maynard Rowhouses	February 25, 2004 (#04000077)	119,121,123 W. Delaware Place; 41°54′04″N 87°37′57″W	Near North Side	
71	McClurg Building	McClurg Building	August 17, 1970 (#70000235)	218 S. Wabash Avenue; 41°52′44″N 87°37′34″W	Chicago Loop	
72	Michigan-Wacker Historic District	Michigan-Wacker Historic District	November 15, 1978 (#78001124)	Michigan Avenue and Wacker Drive and environs 41°53′19″N 87°37′29″W	Chicago Loop	
73	Monadnock Block	Monadnock Block	November 20, 1970 (#70000236)	53 W. Jackson Boulevard; 41°52′41″N 87°37′46″W	Chicago Loop	
74	Montgomery Ward Company Complex	Montgomery Ward Company Complex	June 2, 1978 (#78001125)	619 W. Chicago Avenue; 41°53′50″N 87°38′37″W	Near North Side	
75	Motor Row Historic District	Motor Row Historic District	November 18, 2002 (#02001387)	Roughly bounded by E. Cermak Road, Indiana Avenue, E. 24th Place, and S. Wabash Avenue; 41°51′10″N 87°37′26″W	Near South Side	
76	Municipal Courts Building	Municipal Courts Building	August 29, 1985 (#85001912)	116 S. Michigan Avenue; 41°52′48″N 87°37′28″W	Chicago Loop	
77	The Neuville	The Neuville	January 2, 2013 (#12001113)	232 E. Walton Place; 41°54′01″N 87°37′14″W	Near North Side	
78	New Masonic Building and Oriental Theater	New Masonic Building and Oriental Theater	September 26, 1978 (#78003401)	20 W. Randolph Street; 41°53′04″N 87°37′41″W	Chicago Loop	
79	Samuel Nickerson House	Samuel Nickerson House	November 7, 1976 (#76000700)	40 E. Erie Street; 41°53′38″N 87°37′36″W	Near North Side	
80	North Wells Street Historic District	North Wells Street Historic District	May 3, 1984 (#84001021)	1200 block of N. Wells Street; 41°54′20″N 87°38′05″W	Near North Side	
81	Old Chicago Historical Society Building	Old Chicago Historical Society Building	November 28, 1978 (#78001126)	632 N. Dearborn Street; 41°53′37″N 87°37′48″W	Near North Side	
82	Old Colony Buildings	Old Colony Buildings	January 2, 1976 (#76000701)	407 S. Dearborn Street; 41°52′34″N 87°37′45″W	Chicago Loop	
83	Oliver Building	Oliver Building	December 8, 1983 (#83003563)	159 N. Dearborn Street; 41°53′06″N 87°37′45″W	Chicago Loop	
84	One LaSalle Street Building	One LaSalle Street Building	November 22, 1999 (#99001378)	1 N. LaSalle Street; 41°52′55″N 87°37′56″W	Chicago Loop	
85	Orchestra Hall	Orchestra Hall	March 21, 1978 (#78001127)	220 S. Michigan Avenue; 41°52′43″N 87°37′29″W	Chicago Loop	
86	Page Brothers Building	Page Brothers Building	June 5, 1975 (#75000649)	177–91 N. State Street; 41°53′08″N 87°37′39″W	Chicago Loop	
87	Palmolive Building	Palmolive Building	August 21, 2003 (#03000784)	919 N. Michigan Avenue; 41°53′59″N 87°37′26″W	Near North Side	
88	Peck and Hills Furniture Company Warehouse	Peck and Hills Furniture Company Warehouse	May 18, 2015 (#15000225)	909 W. Bliss Street; 41°54′04″N 87°39′04″W	Near North Side	
89	Peoples Gas Building	Peoples Gas Building	November 13, 1984 (#84000293)	122 S. Michigan Avenue; 41°52′47″N 87°37′29″W	Chicago Loop	
90	Pontiac Building	Pontiac Building	March 16, 1976 (#76000702)	542 S. Dearborn Street; 41°52′29″N 87°37′44″W	Chicago Loop	
91	Prairie Avenue District	Prairie Avenue District	November 15, 1972 (#72000452)	S. Prairie Avenue; 41°51′26″N 87°37′19″W	Near South Side	
92	Quigley Preparatory Seminary	Quigley Preparatory Seminary	February 16, 1996 (#96000093)	103 E. Chestnut Street; 41°53′52″N 87°37′33″W	Near North Side	
93	Quinn Chapel of the A.M.E. Church	Quinn Chapel of the A.M.E. Church	September 4, 1979 (#79000827)	2401 S. Wabash Avenue; 41°50′56″N 87°37′30″W	Near South Side	
94	Railway Exchange Building	Railway Exchange Building	June 3, 1982 (#82002530)	80 E. Jackson Boulevard and 224 S. Michigan Avenue; 41°52′42″N 87°37′28″W	Chicago Loop	
95	Harriet F. Rees House	Harriet F. Rees House	May 22, 2007 (#07000458)	2017 S. Prairie Avenue; 41°51′14″N 87°37′15″W	Near South Side	Moved from 2110 S. Prairie Avenue in 2014
96	Reid House	Reid House	August 21, 2003 (#03000783)	2013 S. Prairie Avenue; 41°51′19″N 87°37′12″W	Near South Side	
97	Reid Murdoch Building	Reid Murdoch Building	August 28, 1975 (#75000650)	325 N. LaSalle Street; 41°53′17″N 87°37′54″W	Near North Side	
98	Reliance Building	Reliance Building	October 15, 1970 (#70000237)	32 N. State Street; 41°52′58″N 87°37′42″W	Chicago Loop	
99	Rookery Building	Rookery Building	April 17, 1970 (#70000238)	209 S. LaSalle Street; 41°52′45″N 87°37′56″W	Chicago Loop	
100	A. M. Rothschild & Company Store	A. M. Rothschild & Company Store	November 27, 1989 (#89002025)	333 S. State Street; 41°52′39″N 87°37′38″W	Chicago Loop	
101	St. Luke's Hospital Complex	St. Luke's Hospital Complex	November 24, 1982 (#82000392)	1435 S. Michigan Avenue; 41°51′47″N 87°37′23″W	Near South Side	
102	Second Presbyterian Church	Second Presbyterian Church	December 27, 1974 (#74000754)	1936 S. Michigan Avenue; 41°51′21″N 87°37′28″W	Near South Side	
103	John G. Shedd Aquarium	John G. Shedd Aquarium	February 27, 1987 (#87000820)	1200 S. Lake Shore Drive; 41°52′04″N 87°36′50″W	Near South Side	
104	Silversmith Building	Silversmith Building	May 16, 1997 (#97000435)	10 S. Wabash Avenue; 41°52′52″N 87°37′35″W	Chicago Loop	
105	Singer Building	Singer Building	February 10, 1983 (#83000314)	120 S. State Street; 41°52′48″N 87°37′41″W	Chicago Loop	
106	J. P. Smith Shoe Company Factory		January 2, 2026 (#100012477)	223 West Erie Street; 41°53′38″N 87°38′07″W	Near North Side	
107	Somerset Hotel	Somerset Hotel	March 3, 2000 (#00000153)	1152–1154 S. Wabash Avenue; 41°52′04″N 87°37′34″W	Chicago Loop	
108	South Dearborn Street-Printing House Row Historic District	South Dearborn Street-Printing House Row Historic District	January 7, 1976 (#76000705)	S. Dearborn Street and W. Jackson Boulevard; 41°52′42″N 87°37′41″W	Chicago Loop	
109	South Loop Printing House District	South Loop Printing House District	March 2, 1978 (#78001130)	Roughly bounded by W. Taylor Street, W. Polk Street, S. Wells Street, W. Congress Parkway and S. State Street; 41°52′26″N 87°37′51″W	Chicago Loop	
110	The Steuben Club	The Steuben Club	May 22, 2007 (#07000457)	188 W. Randolph Street; 41°53′04″N 87°38′01″W	Chicago Loop	
111	Studebaker Building	Studebaker Building	August 11, 1975 (#75000653)	414 S. Michigan Avenue; 41°52′34″N 87°37′29″W	Chicago Loop	
112	Swedish Club of Chicago	Swedish Club of Chicago	December 2, 1985 (#85003031)	1258 N. LaSalle Street; 41°54′20″N 87°38′00″W	Near North Side	
113	Tree Studio Building and Annexes	Tree Studio Building and Annexes	December 16, 1974 (#74000756)	4 E. Ohio Street; 41°53′34″N 87°37′40″W	Near North Side	
114	Trustees System Service Building	Trustees System Service Building	September 3, 1998 (#98001132)	201 N. Wells Street; 41°53′10″N 87°38′01″W	Chicago Loop	
115	Mark Twain Hotel	Mark Twain Hotel	May 8, 2017 (#100000961)	111 W. Division Street; 41°54′14″N 87°37′55″W	Near North Side	
116	Vesta Accumulator Company Building	Vesta Accumulator Company Building	January 2, 2013 (#12001115)	2100 S. Indiana Avenue; 41°51′15″N 87°37′22″W	Near South Side	
117	William Waller House	William Waller House	November 21, 1980 (#80001346)	1012 N. Dearborn Street; 41°54′03″N 87°37′49″W	Near North Side	
118	Washington Square	Washington Square	May 20, 1991 (#91000566)	901 N. Clark Street; 41°53′58″N 87°37′50″W	Near North Side	
119	Washington Square Historic District	Washington Square Historic District	August 21, 2003 (#03000786)	Washington Square, N. Dearborn Street, from W. Walton Street to W. Chicago Avenue; 41°53′56″N 87°37′49″W	Near North Side	
120	West Burton Place Historic District	West Burton Place Historic District	December 6, 2007 (#07001239)	143-161 W. Burton Place; 41°54′32″N 87°38′02″W	Near North Side	
121	West Loop–LaSalle Street Historic District	West Loop–LaSalle Street Historic District	June 1, 2013 (#12001238)	Roughly bounded by W. Wacker Drive N. & S. Wells Street, W. Van Buren Street and N. & S. Clark Street; 41°52′50″N 87°37′56″W	Chicago Loop	Second set of addresses represents a boundary increase on 2017-07-24
122	Wheeler-Kohn House	Wheeler-Kohn House	August 12, 1999 (#99000975)	2018 S. Calumet Avenue; 41°51′18″N 87°37′10″W	Near South Side	
123	Wooden Alley	Wooden Alley	May 22, 2002 (#02000543)	1535 N. between N. Astor Street and N. State Street; 41°54′37″N 87°37′42″W	Near North Side	
124	YMCA Hotel	YMCA Hotel	August 30, 1989 (#89001202)	824 S. Wabash Avenue; 41°52′17″N 87°37′34″W	Chicago Loop	

== Former listings ==
	Name on the Register	Image	Date listed	Date removed	Location	Description
1	Chicago Stock Exchange Building	Chicago Stock Exchange Building	March 26, 1970 (#70000911)	December 7, 1971	30 N. LaSalle Street	Demolished in 1971
2	Grand Central Passenger Station	Grand Central Passenger Station	June 3, 1971 (#71001084)	October 28, 1971	S. Wells & W. Harrison Streets	Demolished in 1971
3	Leiter I Building	Leiter I Building	April 17, 1970 (#70000910)	February 16, 1972	200 W. Monroe Street	Demolished in 1972
4	McCarthy Building		June 16, 1976 (#76000698)	December 8, 1995	W. Washington & N. Dearborn Streets	Demolished in 1987
5	Municipal Pier	Municipal Pier	September 13, 1979 (#79000825)	February 14, 1992	200 N. Streeter Drive; 41°53′29″N 87°35′59″W	Removed in 1992 due to significant alterations
6	New Michigan Hotel	New Michigan Hotel	December 8, 1983 (#83003562)	March 14, 2002	2135 S. Michigan Avenue	Originally called the Lexington Hotel, the building was demolished in 1996.
7	Soldier Field	Soldier Field	August 9, 1984 (#84001052)	February 17, 2006	425 E. 14th Street; 41°51′45″N 87°36′59″W	Near South Side. Designation removed due to extensive renovations.
8	Unity Building	Unity Building	September 6, 1979 (#79000829)	December 8, 1995	127 N. Dearborn Street	Demolished in 1989
9	Western Methodist Book Concern Building		September 11, 1975 (#75000654)	December 8, 1995	12 W. Washington Street	Demolished in 1990

== See also ==
- List of Chicago Landmarks (the historic places listed as Chicago Landmarks are protected by city ordinance)
- National Register of Historic Places listings in Cook County, Illinois
- List of National Historic Landmarks in Illinois
  - National Register of Historic Places listings in North Side Chicago
  - National Register of Historic Places listings in South Side Chicago
  - National Register of Historic Places listings in West Side Chicago
