= Singer Building (disambiguation) =

The Singer Building was an early skyscraper in New York City.

Singer Building may also refer to:

- Singer Building (Los Angeles)
- Singer Building (Pasadena)
- Singer Building (Chicago), a skyscraper
- Singer Building (Dallas)

== See also ==
- Singer House, a building in Saint Petersburg, Russia
- John F. Singer House, a historic house in Wilkinsburg, Pennsylvania
