= American Seedsman =

American magazine

- Front cover from March 1920, the magazine's first-anniversary edition
- Categories: Agriculture
- Frequency: Monthly
- First issue: 1919 (107 years ago)
- Country: United States

American Seedsman was a monthly American agricultural magazine founded in 1919. It was based at 332 South LaSalle Street in Chicago, Illinois. In 1920, it had a print circulation of around three thousand. It featured articles on the growing and harvesting of seeds.

In 1920, its former editor, Newton C. Evans, became managing editor, with John J. Garland succeeding him as editor. Garland joined the publication from Holmes–Letherman Seed Company in Canton, Ohio, for whom he was treasurer.
