= Carling Hotel (Chicago) =

- U.S. National Register of Historic Places
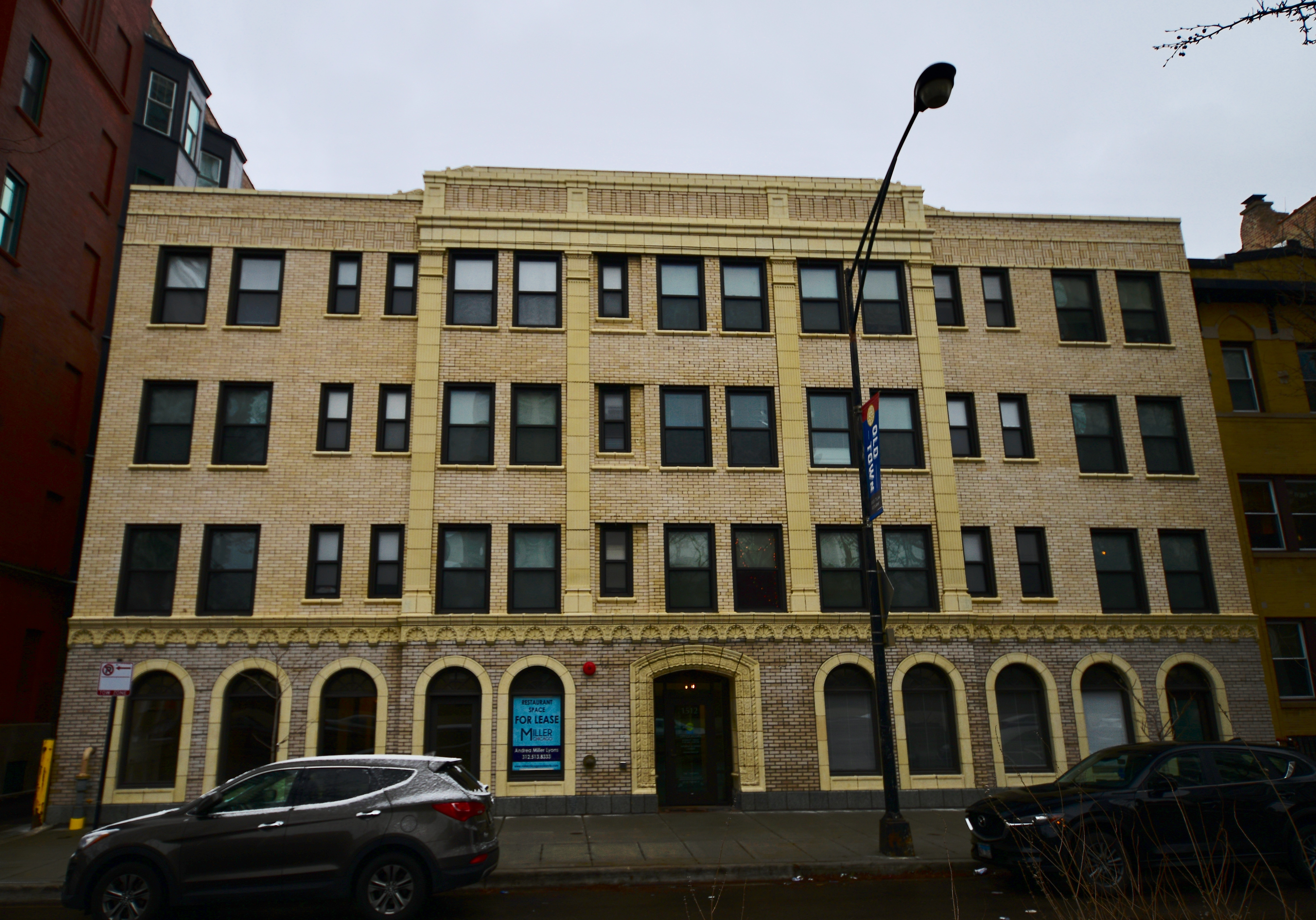

- Location within Chicago metropolitan area Location within Illinois Location within the United States
- Location: 1512 N. LaSalle Street, Chicago, Illinois
- Coordinates: 41°54′35″N 87°38′01″W
- Built: 1927
- Architect: Edmund J. Meles
- Architectural style: Classical Revival, Renaissance Revival
- NRHP reference No.: 100000563
- Added to NRHP: January 24, 2017

The Carling Hotel is a historic residential hotel located at 1512 N. LaSalle Street in the Near North Side neighborhood of Chicago, Illinois. Built in 1927, the hotel was one of many residential hotels constructed to house an influx of labor to Chicago in the early 20th century. While the hotel offered rooms to both temporary and permanent residents, census records indicate that most of its residents were permanent. Architect Edmund J. Meles, who designed several large hotels and apartment buildings in Chicago, designed the building in a blend of the Classical Revival and Renaissance Revival styles. The brick building features extensive terra cotta ornamentation, including entrance and window surrounds, pilasters, and a molded cornice above the first floor.

The building was added to the National Register of Historic Places on January 24, 2017.
