= Pontiac Building =

Office skyscraper in Chicago, Illinois

- U.S. National Register of Historic Places
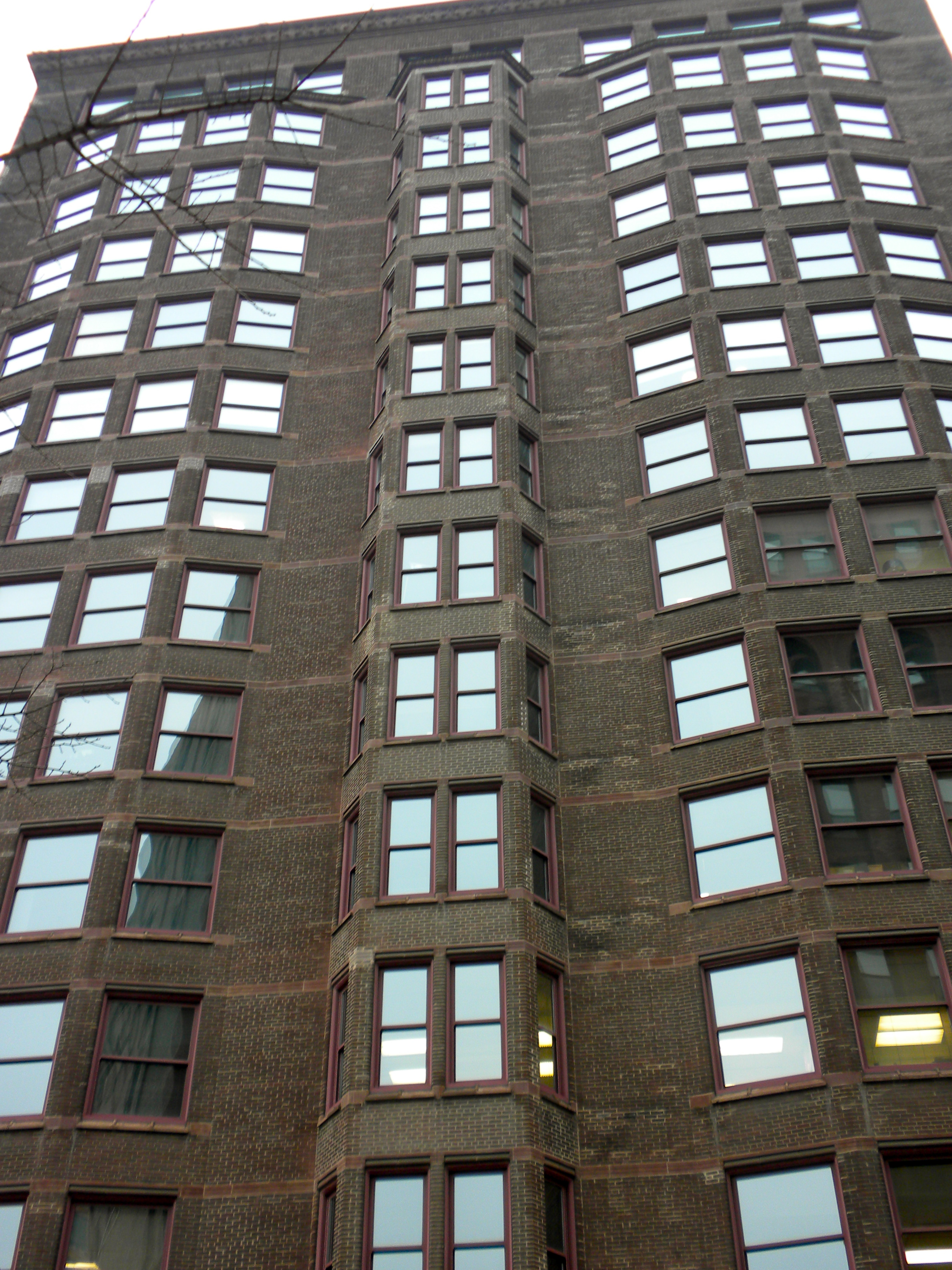
- The Pontiac Building's Dearborn Street facade

- Location within Chicago metropolitan area Location within Illinois Location within the United States
- Location: 542 S. Dearborn St., Chicago, Illinois
- Coordinates: 41°52′29″N 87°37′44″W
- Area: less than one acre
- Built: 1891
- Architect: Holabird & Roche
- Architectural style: Chicago school
- NRHP reference No.: 76000702
- Added to NRHP: March 16, 1976

The Pontiac Building is a historic high-rise building located at 542 S. Dearborn St. in the Printer's Row neighborhood of Chicago, Illinois.

== History ==
Built in 1891, the building is the oldest surviving work in downtown Chicago designed by the architecture firm Holabird & Roche. The fourteen-story building represents the Chicago school of architecture and is designed as a steel frame covered in brick. The building's Dearborn Street facade features three tiers of bay windows, while the facade on Federal Street features one tier of bay windows flanked by two tiers of flat windows; while the outer two tiers on both facades each span two bays, the middle tier spans only one. The bottoms of these tiers of windows, located at the second floor of the building, feature terra cotta soffits; the building's cornice is also terra cotta. The first two floors of the building feature limestone piers with decorative capitals. Due to the building's architectural significance, it was added to the National Register of Historic Places on March 16, 1976.

As of August 2026, the building is being converted into 74 apartments.

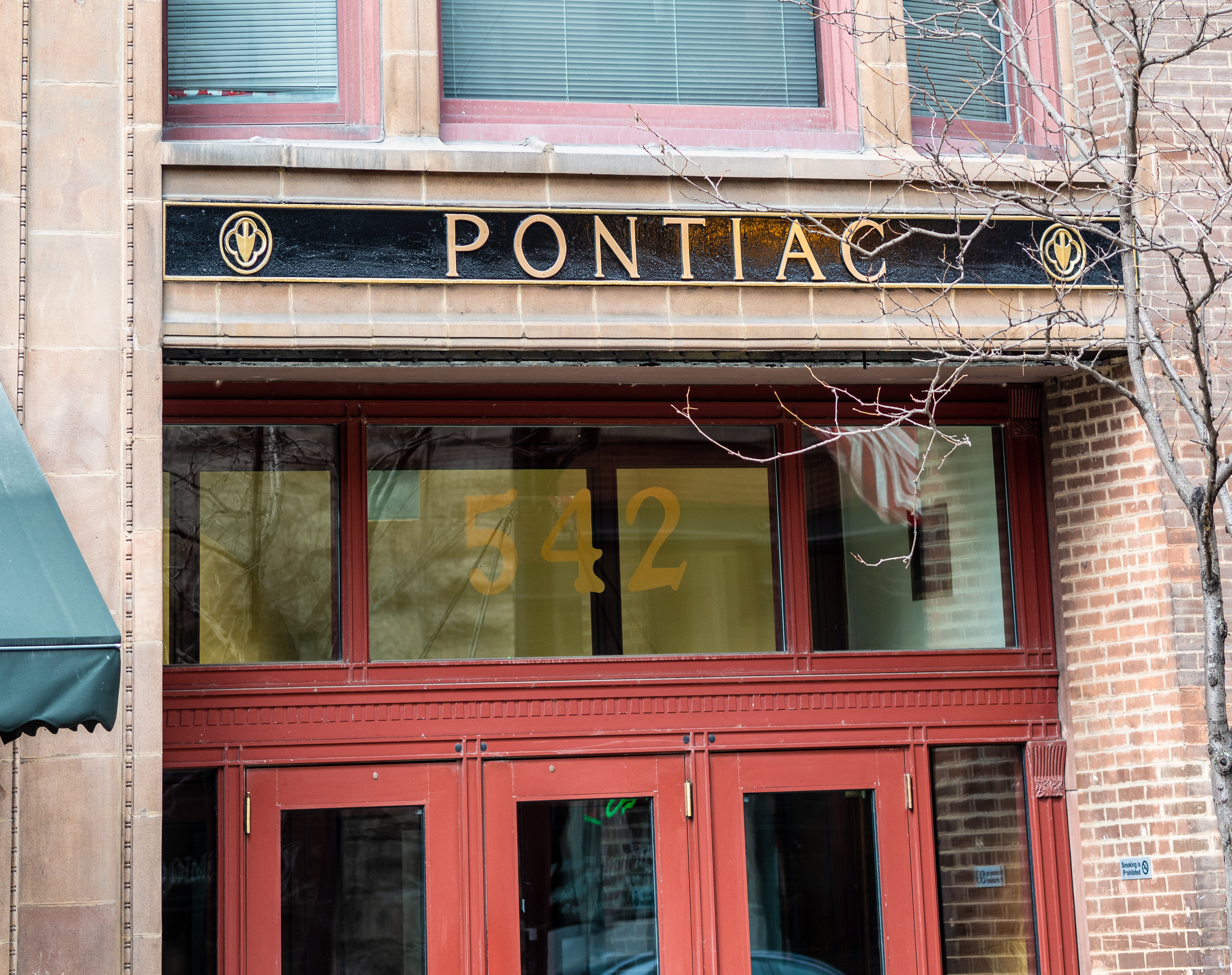
Main Entrance

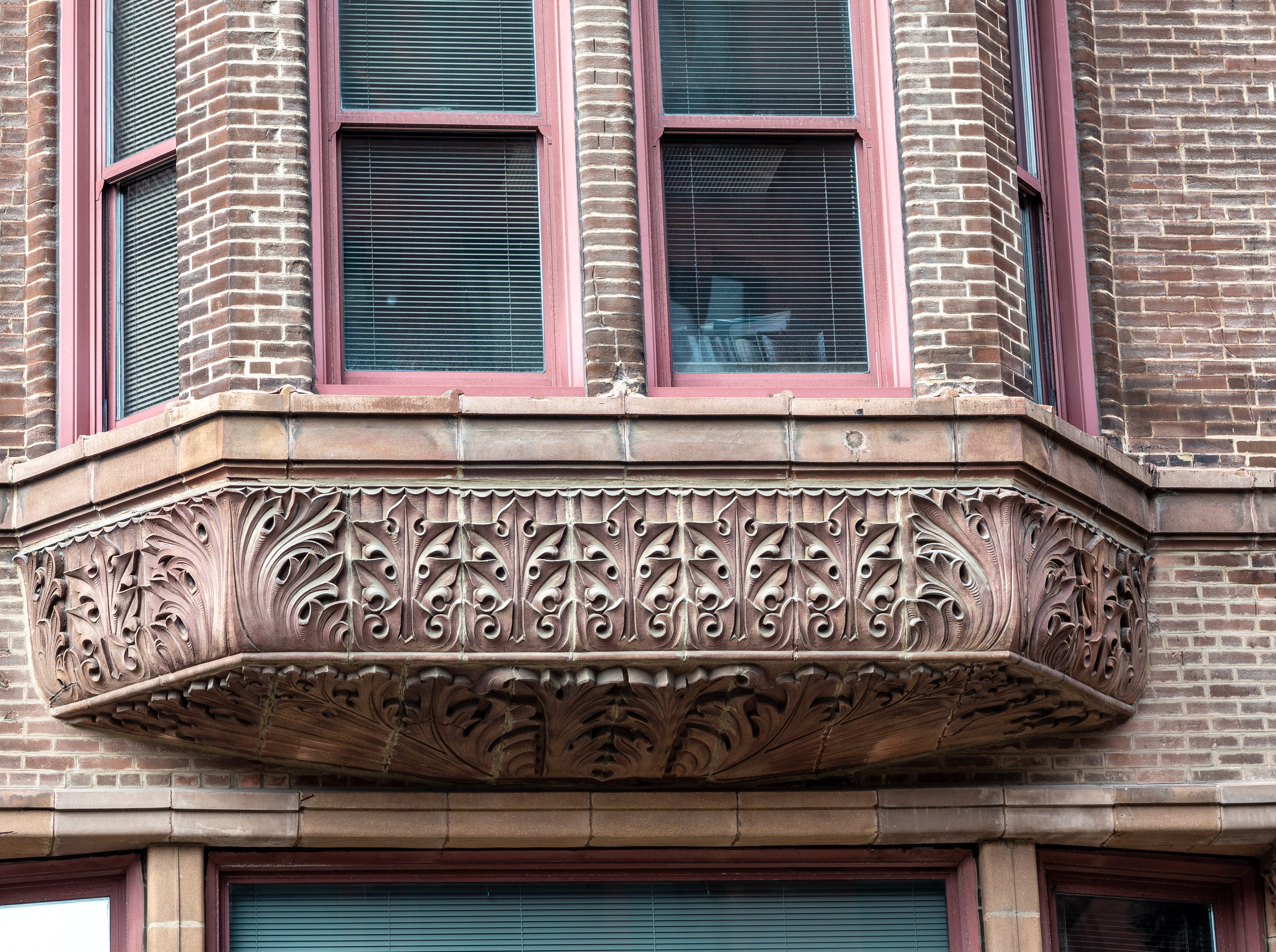
Window Detail

== See also ==
- National Register of Historic Places listings in Central Chicago
