= Marshall Hotel (Chicago) =

- U.S. National Register of Historic Places
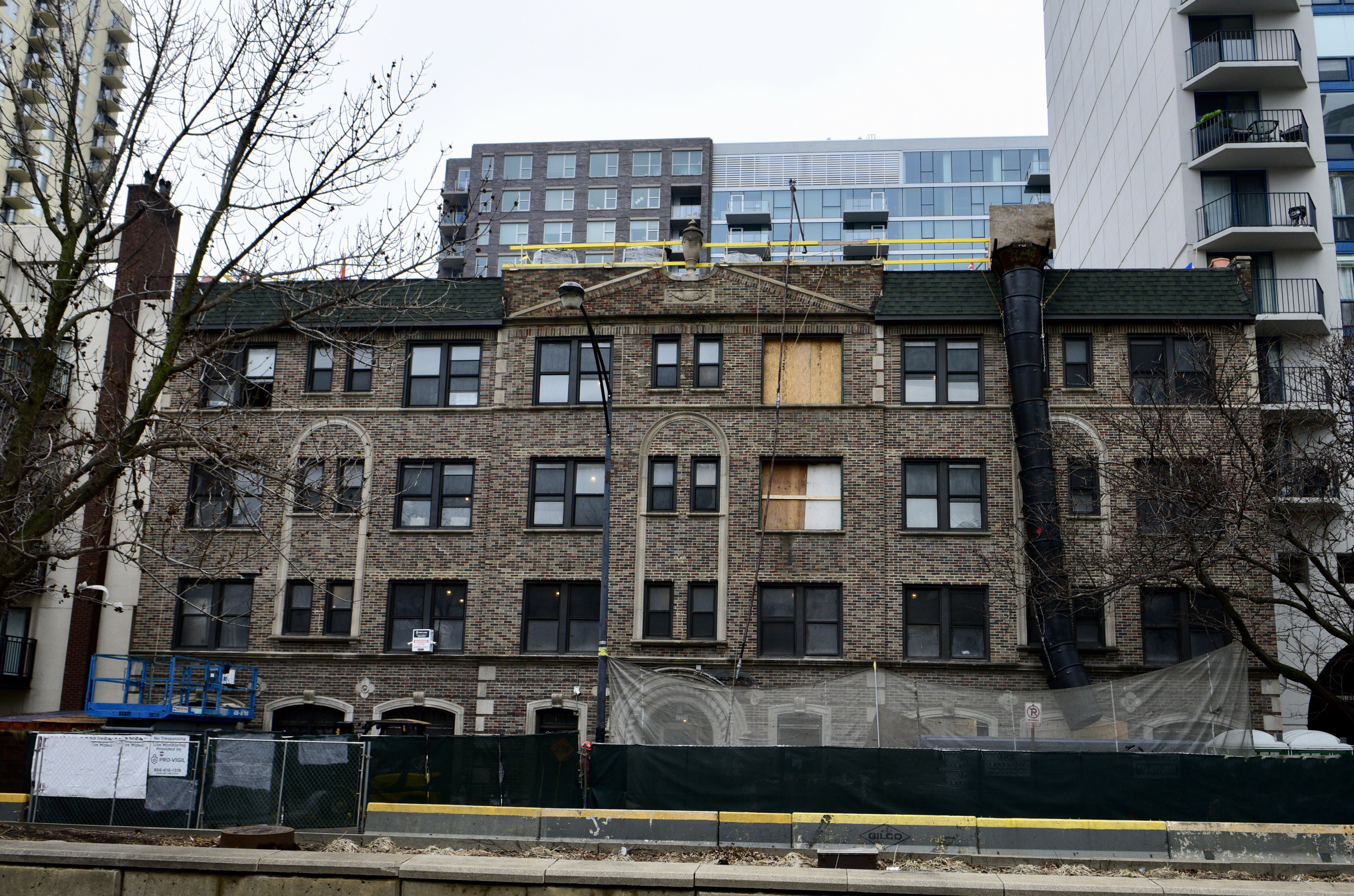

- Location within Chicago metropolitan area Location within Illinois Location within the United States
- Location: 1232 N. LaSalle Street, Chicago, Illinois
- Coordinates: 41°54′17″N 87°37′59″W
- Built: 1927
- Architect: Edmund Meles
- Architectural style: Classical Revival, Renaissance Revival
- NRHP reference No.: 100001833
- Added to NRHP: November 27, 2017

The Marshall Hotel is a historic residential hotel located at 1232 N. LaSalle Street in the Near North Side neighborhood of Chicago, Illinois. Built in 1927, the hotel was one of several residential hotels built to house an influx of workers to Chicago in the 1920s. While the hotel offered rooms to both temporary and permanent residents, census records indicate that most of its residents were permanent. Architect Edmund Meles, who designed several hotels and apartment buildings in Chicago in the 1920s, designed the building in a mix of the Classical Revival and Renaissance Revival styles. The building has a brick exterior and features a limestone arched entrance, arched lintels with keystones around the first-floor windows, limestone quoins, and a pediment with an urn.

The building was added to the National Register of Historic Places on November 27, 2017.
