= Jackson Boulevard Bridge =

Bridge in Chicago, Illinois, U.S.

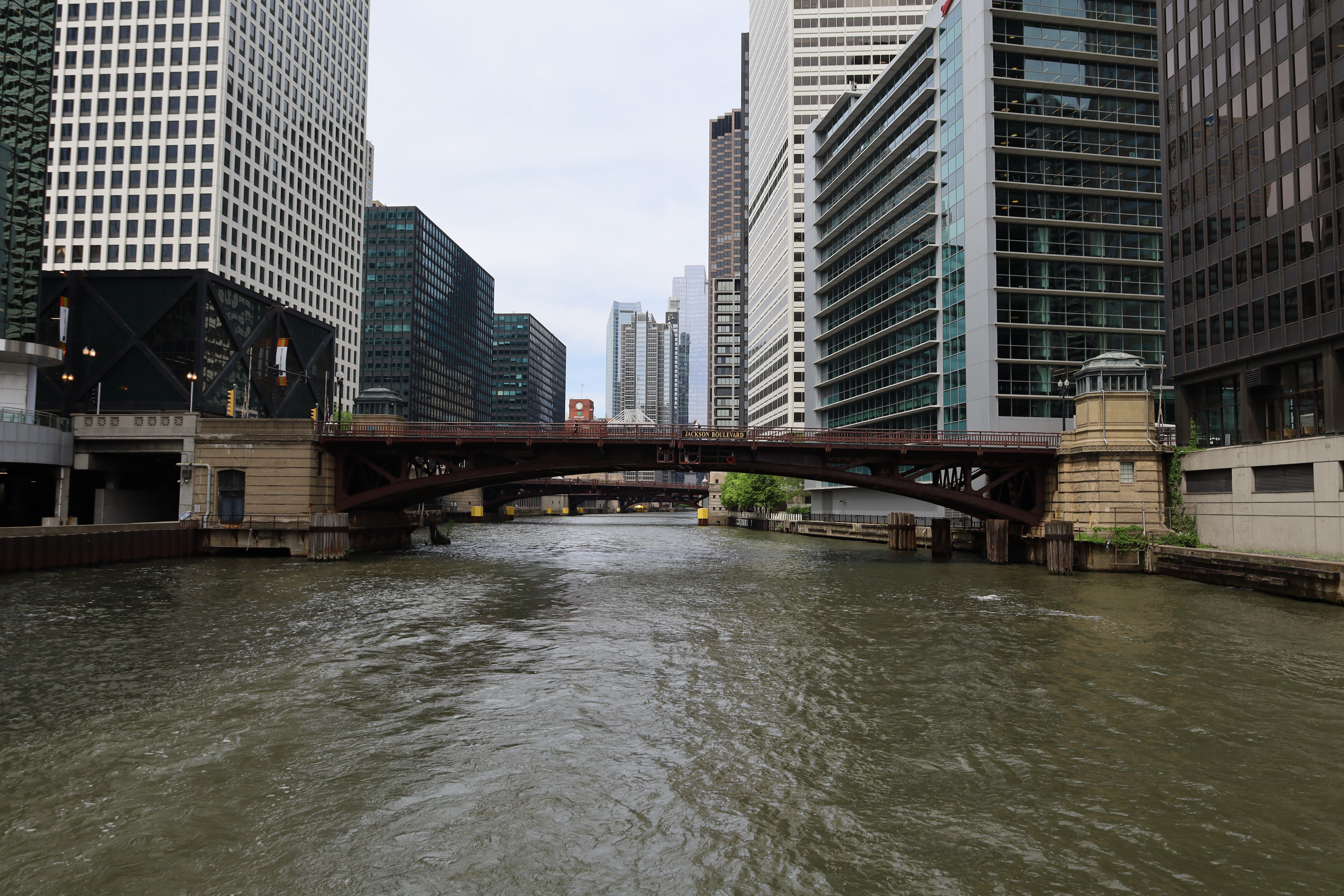
- The bridge in 2023
- Coordinates: 41.87807°N 87.63770°W
- Carries: Pedestrians, bicycles, motor vehicles
- Crosses: South Branch of the Chicago River
- Locale: Chicago Loop
- Named for: Andrew Jackson, after the street on which it resides
- Owner: City of Chicago
- Maintained by: Chicago Department of Transportation
- NBI number: 16602627329
- Preceded by: Adams Street Bridge
- Followed by: Van Buren Street Bridge

Characteristics
- Design: Double-leaf bascule bridge
- Material: Steel
- Total length: 273 feet (83 m)
- Width: 64 feet (20 m)
- Longest span: 202 feet (62 m)
- No. of spans: 1 main & 3 approach
- Clearance below: 15.74 feet (4.80 m)
- No. of lanes: 3 (one-way eastbound)

History
- Engineering design by: Strauss Bascule Bridge Company
- Constructed by: Great Lakes Dredge and Dock Company (substructure); Strobel Steel Construction Company (superstructure)
- Construction end: 1915
- Construction cost: $400,600
- Opened: 29 January 1916
- Rebuilt: 1993
- Replaces: 1888 swing bridge

Statistics
- Daily traffic: 6900 vehicles per day (2014); 22,280 pedestrians per day (1999)

References
- historicbridges.org

The Jackson Boulevard Bridge is a Pratt deck truss, fixed-trunnion, bascule bridge that spans the Chicago River at Jackson Boulevard in downtown Chicago. It was built in 1915 and is 273 feet in length.
