= Van Buren Street =

Street in Chicago

- 400 South
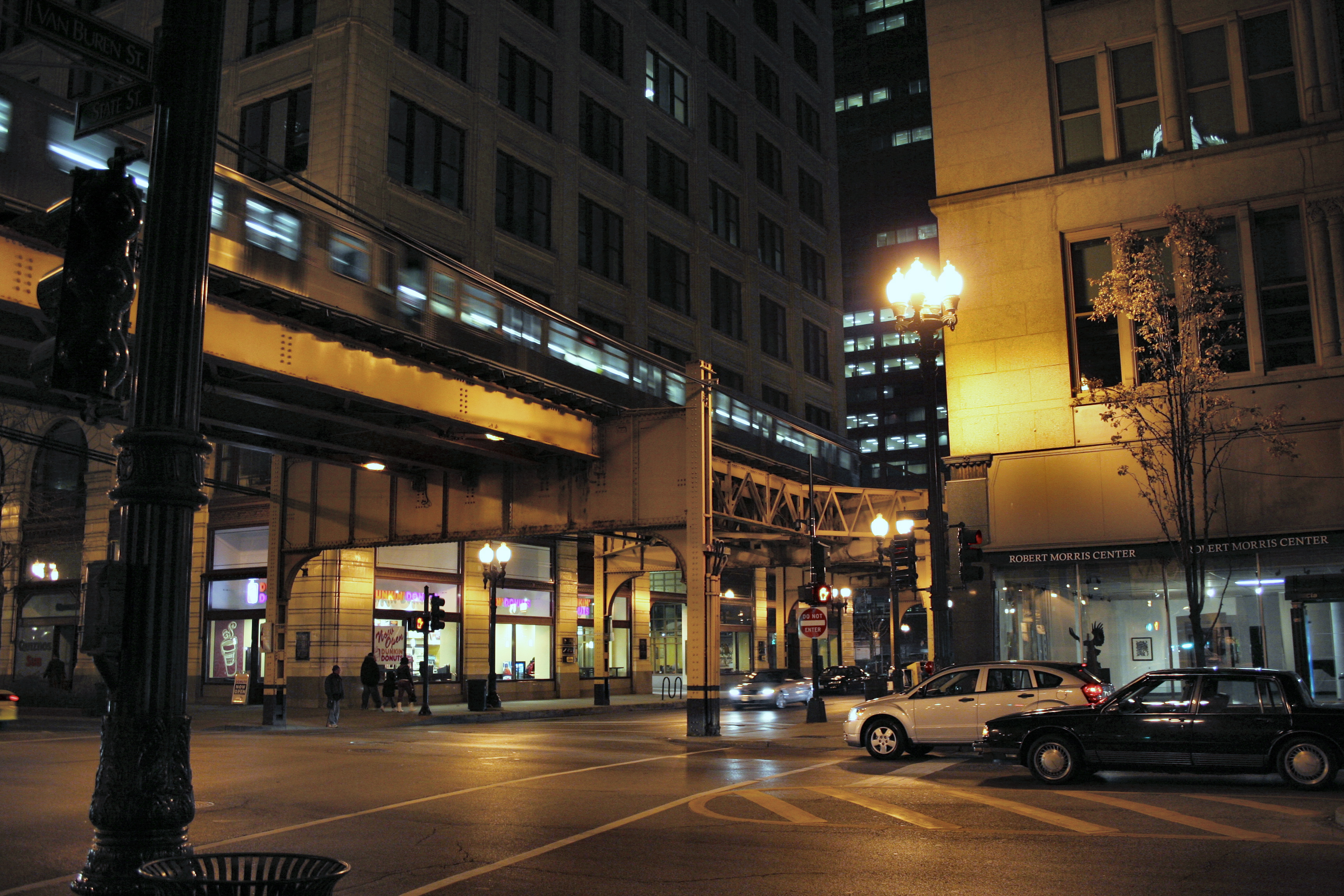
- Van Buren Street under the Loop Elevated at State Street
- Location: Villa Park, Bellwood, Maywood, Oak Park, Chicago
- West end: Ardmore Avenue in Villa Park
- East end: Michigan Avenue/Congress Plaza Drive in Chicago

Van Buren Street is a street in Chicago, in whose grid system it is 400 South. Named for President Martin Van Buren, it is adjacent to Jackson Boulevard named for Van Buren's associate Andrew Jackson.

The Van Buren Street Bridge carries it across the Chicago River.

== Transit ==
The southern leg of the Loop is located over Van Buren Street.

The Metropolitan West Side Elevated Railroad, a founding company of what would become the Chicago "L", constructed its main line – which would later extend west from the Loop – and Garfield Park branch adjacent to Van Buren Street in 1895. When these were demolished to make way for the Congress Superhighway in the 1950s, the successor Congress Line was built in their place in the median of the highway.

A horsecar ran on Van Buren street until it was electrified in 1896. As of 1896 it proceeded west from State Street to Kedzie Street. This streetcars were a competitor to the Metropolitan, siphoning off many of its would-be passengers during the warm summer months as its cars were more open-air. As of 1928, the Van Buren route had owl service between 1:03 and 4:42 a.m., where cars ran on intervals varying between 15, 24, and 30 minutes. On October 11, 1937, the Van Buren route was through-routed with streetcar service on Division Street, about two miles (3.2 km) miles to the north, via downtown. This continued until Division Street service was replaced by buses and Van Buren streetcars were once again independent on February 4, 1951. This was short-lived, however, as buses replaced streetcars on Van Buren on August 12, 1951.

== Works cited ==
- Lind, Alan R. (1974). Chicago Surface Lines: An Illustrated History. Park Forest, Illinois: Transport History Press.
- Moffat, Bruce G. (1995). The "L": The Development of Chicago's Rapid Transit System, 1888–1932. Chicago: Central Electric Railfans' Association. ISBN 0-915348-30-6.
