= Vesta Battery Corporation =

The Vesta Battery Corporation (1897–1964), known until 1929 as the Vesta Accumulator Company, was an American manufacturer of automobile electrical gear. Based in Chicago, Illinois, the company was founded by a former garment worker in 1897. Originally intending to sell parts for electric bicycles, the company quickly diversified to manufacture electrical goods for the burgeoning automobile industry. At its peak, the company had branches in ten American cities. Vesta continued operations until it was purchased by Associated Battery Makers in 1964. Its 1913 factory in Chicago is listed on the National Register of Historic Places.

== History ==
David P. Perry founded the Vesta Accumulator Company in Chicago, Illinois. A native of Painesville, Ohio, Perry had worked in a garment factory early in his life. An interest in electricity led him to join the Standard Electrical Company in Chicago. He became general manager of the organization and also did some work for the Hyde Park Electric Light & Power Company. In 1897, Perry leased 1,000 square feet (93 m^{2}) of space at 53 South Dearborn Street and founded Vesta to manufacture storage batteries and electric bicycle lamps. The Vesta Accumulator Company was officially incorporated later that year with the following officers: president E. Davis, vice president E. E. Crepin, and secretary & treasurer Charles E. Gregory. The next February, Perry assumed the company presidency.

Company executives quickly realized that great profit could be made supplying electrical gear for the growing automobile market. Vesta expanded into the production of generators, ignition batteries, headlights, lamps, and lighting. By 1902, the company needed a larger space to manufacture its products. Vesta relocated to 266 State Street, but only remained for three years until they decided to split office and manufacturing into separate facilities. In 1905, the company built a general office opened at 1336 Michigan Boulevard while they leased factory space at 1521 Wabash Avenue. These buildings were part of the emerging Motor Row District, a stretch of buildings from Wabash to Indiana Avenues from 12th Street to 26th Street.

- Vesta Accumulator Company Building
- U.S. National Register of Historic Places
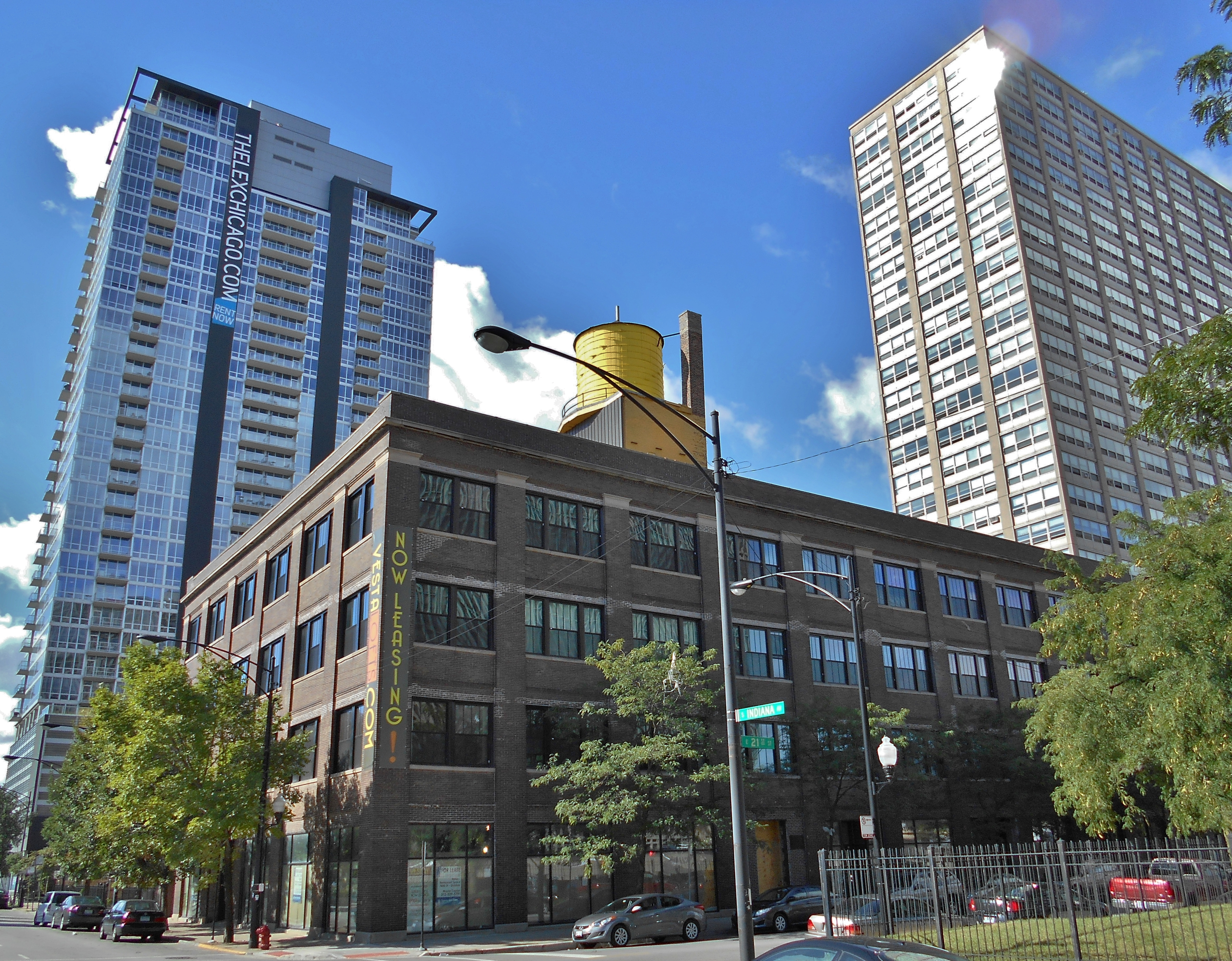

- Location within Chicago metropolitan area Location within Illinois Location within the United States
- Location: 2100 South Indiana Avenue, Chicago, Illinois
- Coordinates: 41°51′15″N 87°37′22″W
- Built: 1913
- Architect: Carl M. Almquist
- Architectural style: Classical Revival
- NRHP reference No.: 12001115
- Added to NRHP: January 2, 2013

When the company again needed additional space, Vesta purchased the Mt. Sinai Temple on the southwest corner of 21st Street and Indiana Avenue. The temple was demolished, and in its place, Vesta built a four-story factory, the first built to the company's specifications. Chicago architect Carl M. Almquist was commissioned to design the building. All operations were again consolidated into the $80,000 building; offices were on the first floor while factory operations were in the basement and upper two stories. Vesta moved in in 1913. The rear of the building featured a service station where customers could bring their automobiles to have the batteries serviced. Vesta became a regional leader in battery production and produced the first battery-supplied electrical lighting for commercial trucks.

Over the next fifteen years, Vesta expanded their operations, opening branches in New York City, Boston, Atlanta, St. Louis, Kansas City, Cleveland, Pittsburgh, Louisville, and Omaha. In 1920, Vesta opened a sales and battery service station at the corner of 29th Street and South Michigan Avenue in Chicago to clear space to allow manufacturing on all levels of the factory. The station featured space for over one hundred cars and five thousand batteries. Later that year, the company officially changed its name to the Vesta Battery Corporation. Net sales in 1921 were approximately $1.8 million.

In 1929, Vesta leased a one-story factory in the Clearing Industrial District, nearly doubling their manufacturing capacity. The former Motor Row factory was leased by the Simoniz Company, a producer of automobile polish products. By the 1970s, the Cook County Department of Public Aid was using the structure. Vesta continued to manufacture car and radio batteries in Clearing for several decades. In 1964, the company was purchased by Associated Battery Makers and the factory closed. The 1913 factory was recognized by the National Park Service with a listing on the National Register of Historic Places on January 2, 2013.
