= The Neuville =

Apartment building in Chicago, Illinois

- U.S. National Register of Historic Places
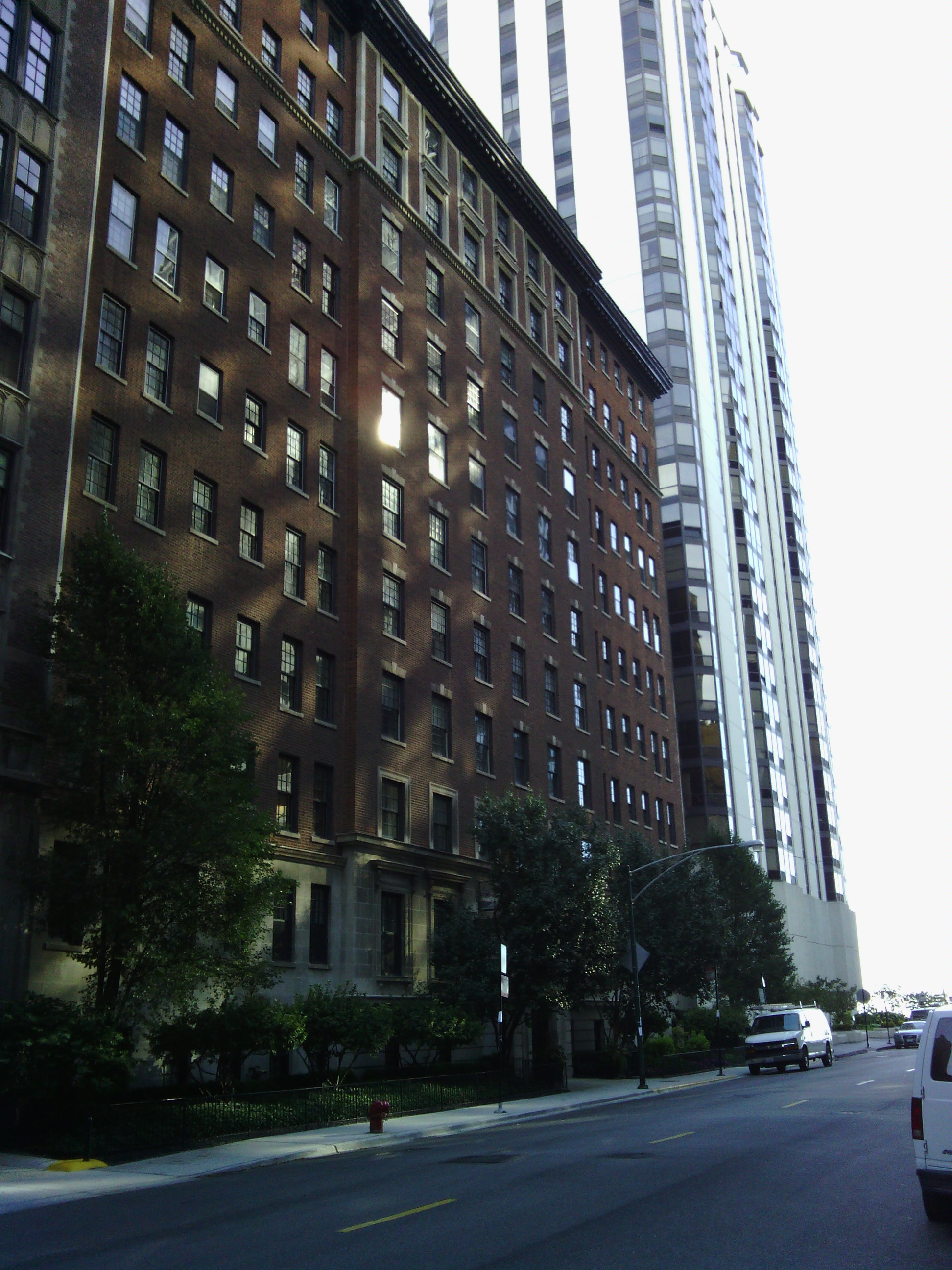

- Location within Illinois Location within the United States
- Location: 232 E. Walton Place, Chicago, Illinois
- Coordinates: 41°54′01″N 87°37′14″W
- Area: less than one acre
- Built: 1920
- Architect: Fugard & Knapp
- Architectural style: Renaissance Revival
- NRHP reference No.: 12001113
- Added to NRHP: January 2, 2013

The Neuville is a historic apartment building located at 232 E. Walton Place in the Streeterville neighborhood of Chicago, Illinois. The eleven-story building was built in 1920, making it one of the first luxury apartment buildings in Streeterville. Architect John Reed Fugard of Fugard & Knapp, a firm which went on to design many of Streeterville's apartments, designed the Renaissance Revival building. As was typical of high-rises of the era, the lower two and upper two floors are the most ornate, with limestone facing on the lower two and projecting piers on the upper two; in contrast, the central floors are faced with plain red brick. An elaborate cornice runs along the roof on the front facade, while a plainer cornice above the second floor and a belt course above the ninth separate the building's sections. Like most luxury apartment buildings of the period, the building features a heavily ornamented entrance, a large lobby, and spacious ten-room apartments.

The building was added to the National Register of Historic Places on January 2, 2013.
