= B.F. Goodrich Company Showroom =

- U.S. National Register of Historic Places
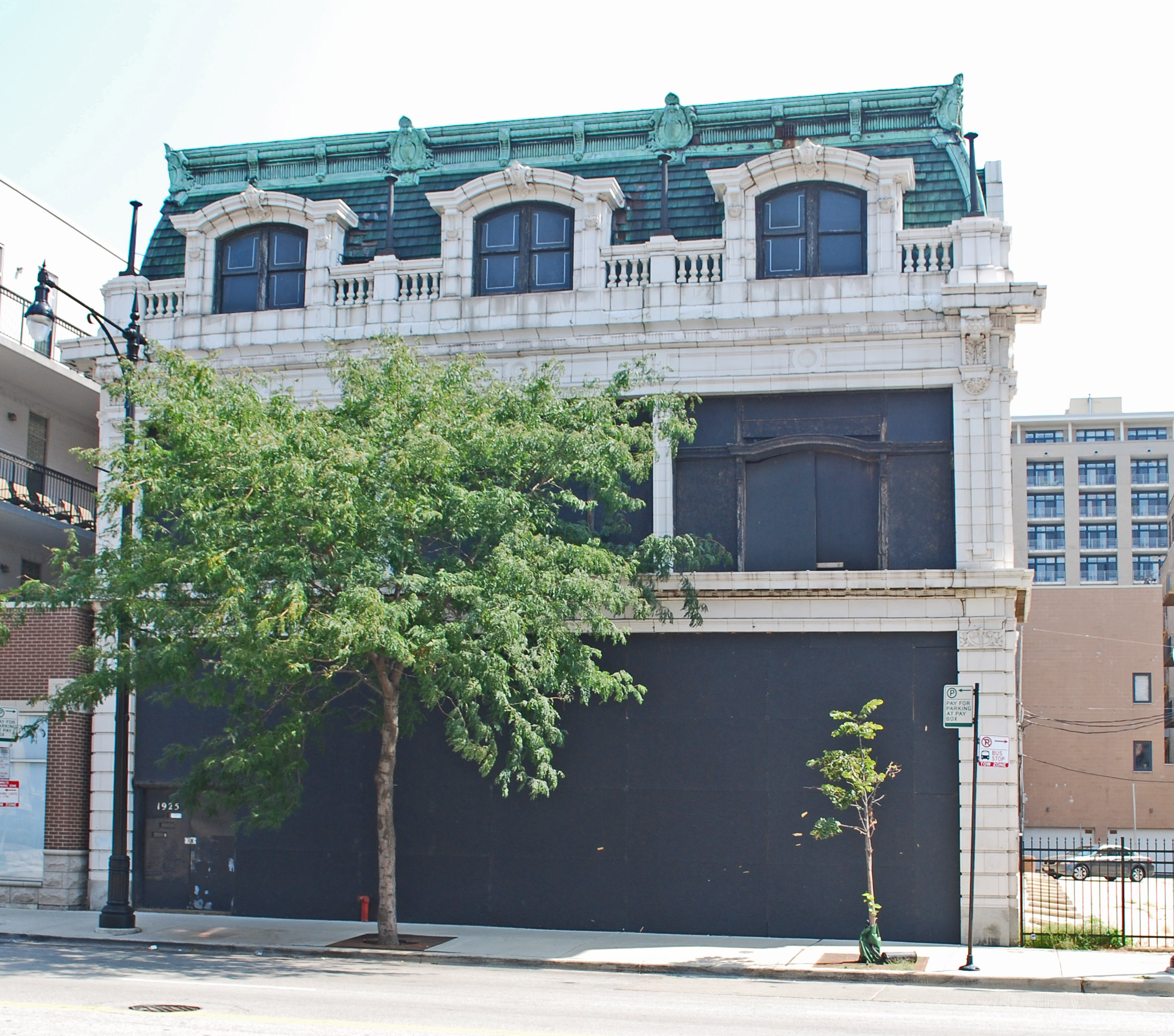

- Location within Chicago metropolitan area Location within Illinois Location within the United States
- Location: 1925 S. Michigan Ave., Chicago, Illinois
- Coordinates: 41°51′21″N 87°37′24″W
- Area: less than one acre
- Built: 1911
- Architect: Eckstorm, Christian Albert; Nielson, S.N.
- Architectural style: Second Empire
- MPS: Motor Row, Chicago, Illinois MPS
- NRHP reference No.: 09000347
- Added to NRHP: May 28, 2009

The B.F. Goodrich Company Showroom is a B.F. Goodrich Company showroom located at 1925 S. Michigan Ave. in Chicago's Motor Row District. The showroom was built in 1911 to sell B.F. Goodrich tires and distribute them to other Chicago retailers. Christian Albert Eckstorm, a Chicago architect who designed many of the Motor Row showrooms, designed the building. The Second Empire building features a mansard roof with a terra cotta balustrade, three dormers with terra cotta frames, a partial cornice, and large second-story windows with arched lintels. Like most Motor Row buildings, its architectural ornaments are primarily located near the top of the building. B.F. Goodrich used the showroom until 1929.

The showroom was added to the National Register of Historic Places on May 28, 2009.
