= North Wells Street Historic District =

- U.S. National Register of Historic Places
- U.S. Historic district
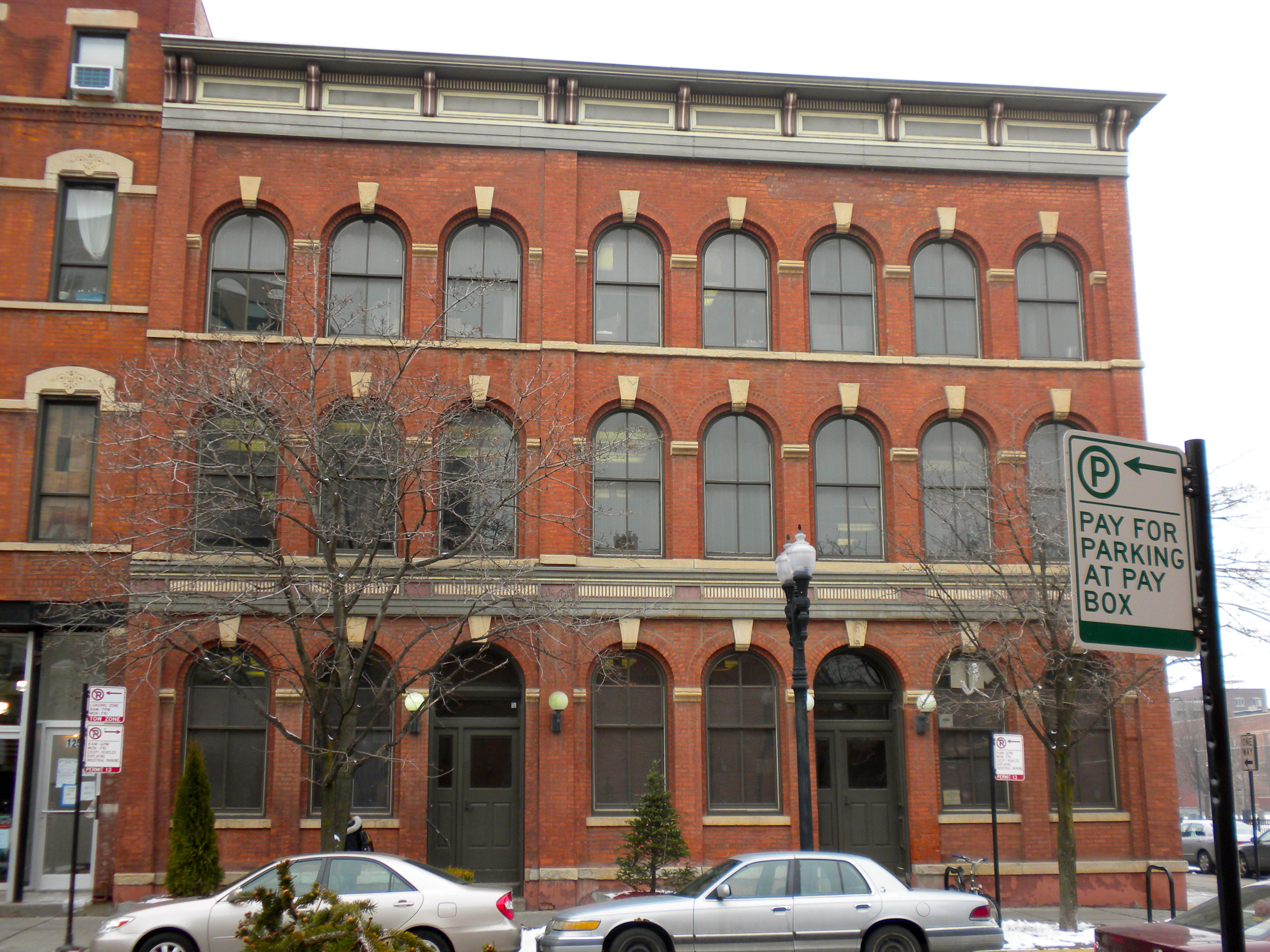
- Engine Company No. 27

- Location within Chicago metropolitan area Location within Illinois Location within the United States
- Location: 1240-1260 N. Wells St., Chicago, Illinois
- Coordinates: 41°54′20″N 87°38′5″W
- Area: less than one acre
- Built: 1871
- Architectural style: Italianate, Queen Anne
- NRHP reference No.: 84001021
- Added to NRHP: May 3, 1984

The North Wells Street Historic District is a commercial historic district located on the west side of the 1200 block of North Wells Street in the Near North Side neighborhood of Chicago, Illinois. The district consists of seven buildings: four stores, two factories, and a firehouse. Built from 1871 to 1888, the buildings are an unusually intact block of what was once a much larger commercial district on the Near North Side. The four stores include a two-story frame storefront building, one of only six remaining from the post-Chicago Fire period in the city, and three three- or three-and-a-half-story store and flat buildings. The factories include a three-story loft and a two-story building that resembles the storefronts. The firehouse, known as Engine Company No. 27, is the second-oldest in the city.

The district was added to the National Register of Historic Places on May 3, 1984.
