= Peck and Hills Furniture Company Warehouse =

- U.S. National Register of Historic Places
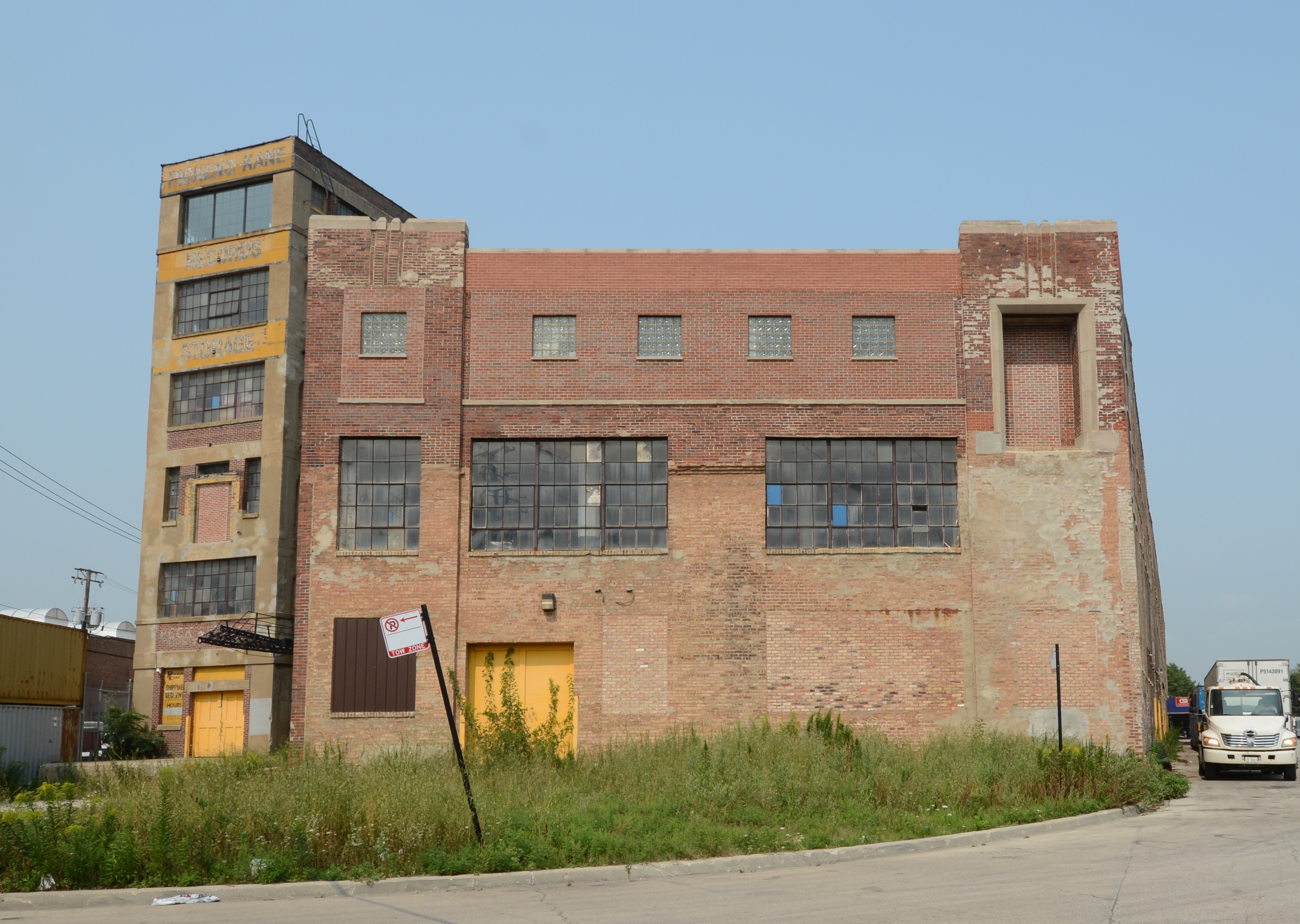

- Location within Chicago metropolitan area Location within Illinois Location within the United States
- Location: 909 W. Bliss Street, Chicago, Illinois
- Coordinates: 41°54′04″N 87°39′04″W
- Built: 1901
- NRHP reference No.: 15000225
- Added to NRHP: May 18, 2015

The Peck and Hills Furniture Company Warehouse is a historic warehouse located at 909 West Bliss Street on Goose Island in Chicago, Illinois. Built in 1901, the warehouse was the main storage and distribution facility for the Peck and Hills Furniture Company. Founded in 1896, the company became the largest furniture distributor in the country by the end of the 1920s. The company's warehouse facilities, which were expanded significantly during its growth, were integral to its ability to expand into new markets. The warehouse also connected to the city's railway network, allowing the company to easily ship its goods across the country. Peck and Hills declined significantly during the Great Depression, and it sold its Chicago warehouse facilities in 1942. The warehouse is now one of the few remnants of Goose Island's industrial history.

The warehouse was added to the National Register of Historic Places on May 18, 2015. on April 15th 1929 Peck and Hills opened a manufacturing plant at what is now 1000 Denny Way in Seattle. The building was shared with the Baxley Dress company on the 8th floor. The building is still in use today.
