= Building at 14–16 Pearson Street =

- U.S. National Register of Historic Places
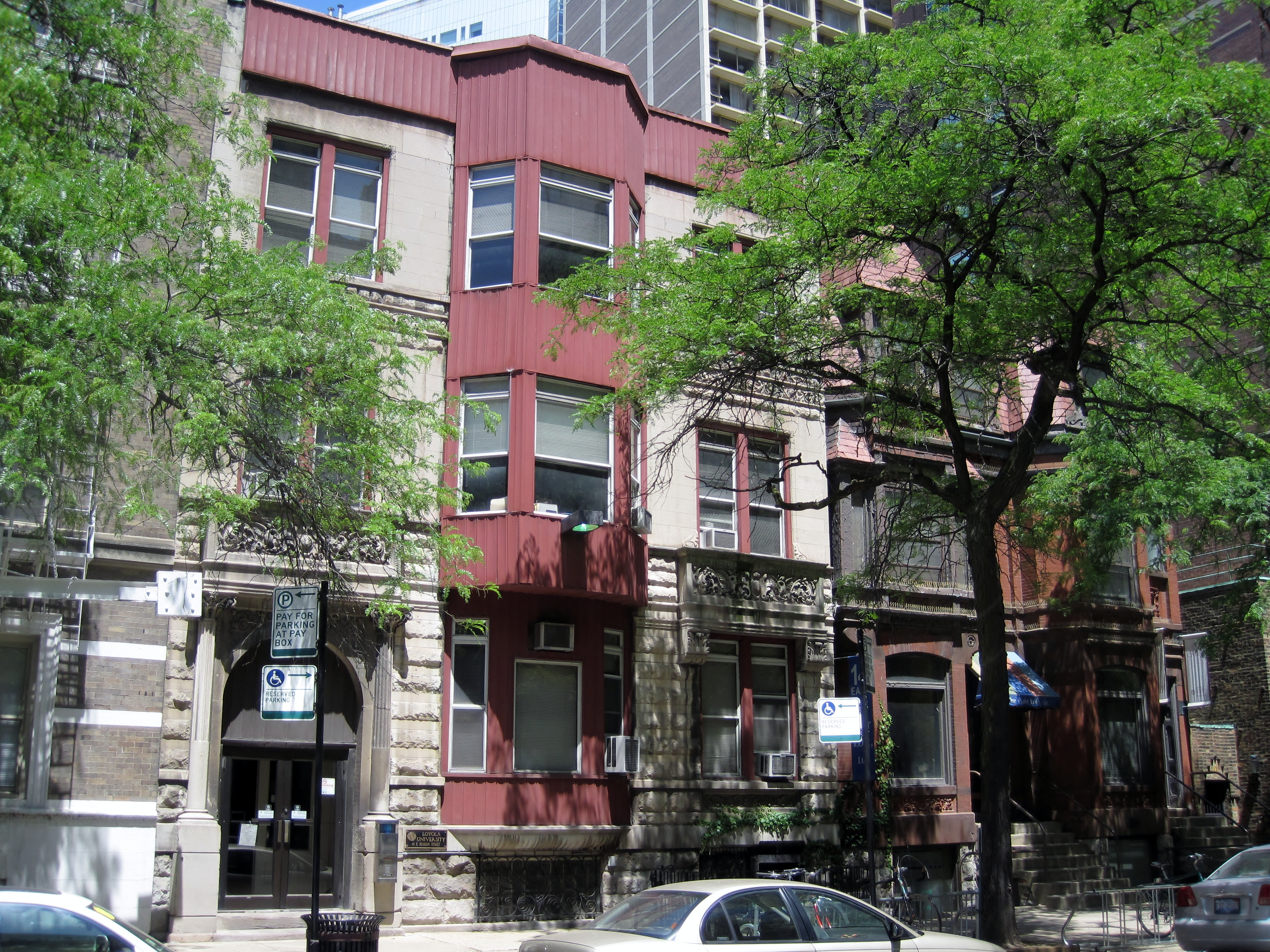
- The building (right), with its neighbor at 10 Pearson on the left

- Location within Illinois Location within the United States
- Location: 14–16 Pearson Street, Chicago, Illinois
- Coordinates: 41°53′51″N 87°37′40″W
- Area: less than one acre
- Built: 1885
- Architect: Julius H. Huber
- NRHP reference No.: 80001343
- Added to NRHP: May 8, 1980

The Building at 14–16 Pearson Street was a historic residential building located in the Near North Side neighborhood of Chicago, Illinois. Lumber salesman Edwin S. Hartwell had the building built in 1885 as a side venture into real estate. Architect Julius H. Huber designed the building, which was an unusual example of a Queen Anne-inspired brick building. The building's facade featured two bays topped with dormers; the more ornate western bay included corbelling, hipped roofs over the windows, and a metal pinnacle atop its dormer. The second floors of both bays included decorative panels, one featuring a man's head and one featuring a woman's. The building was topped by a mansard roof.

The building was added to the National Register of Historic Places on May 8, 1980. Loyola University Chicago's Schreiber Center now occupies the site of the building.

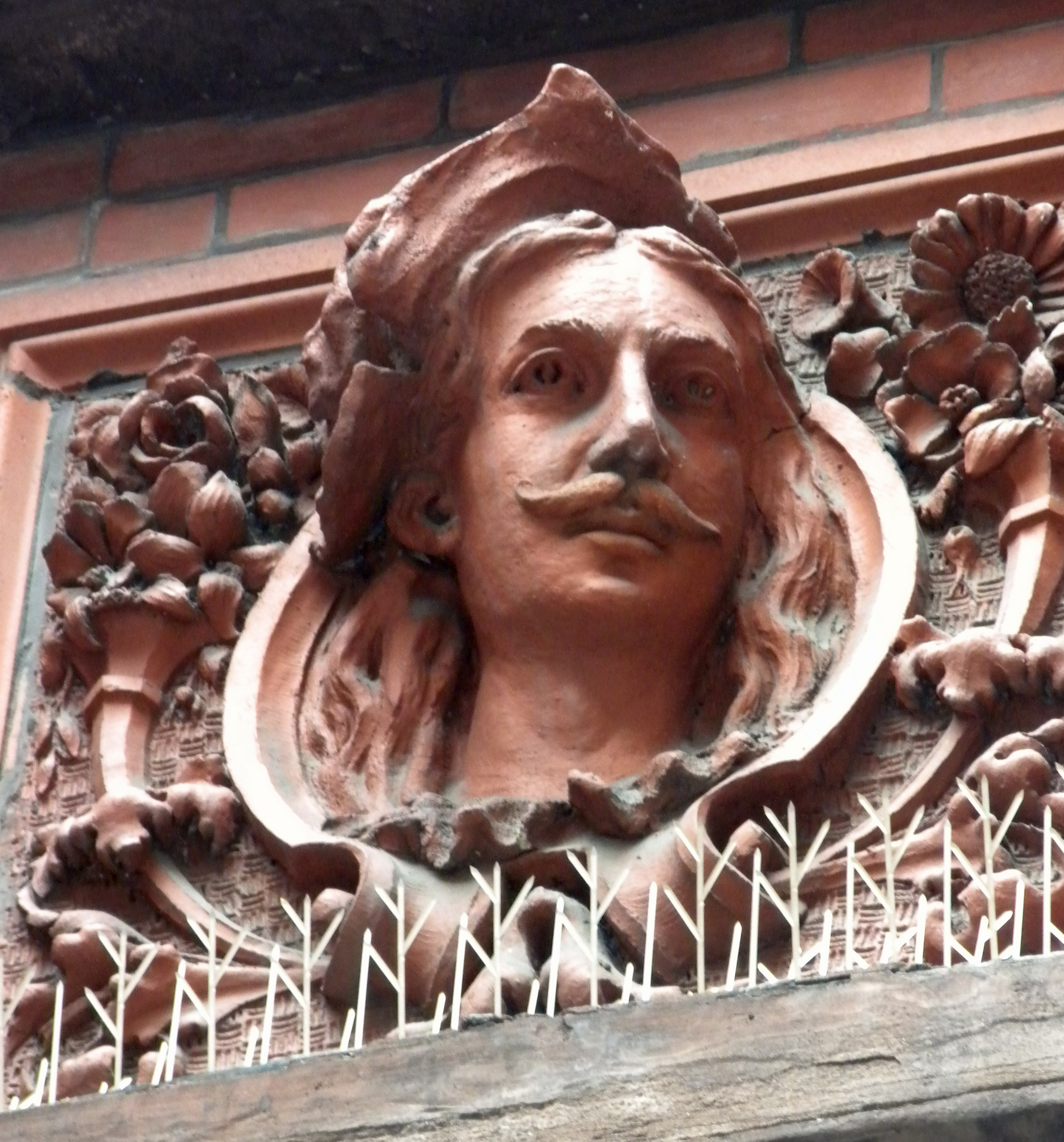
Decorative panel on the building
