= Burlingham Building =

- U.S. National Register of Historic Places
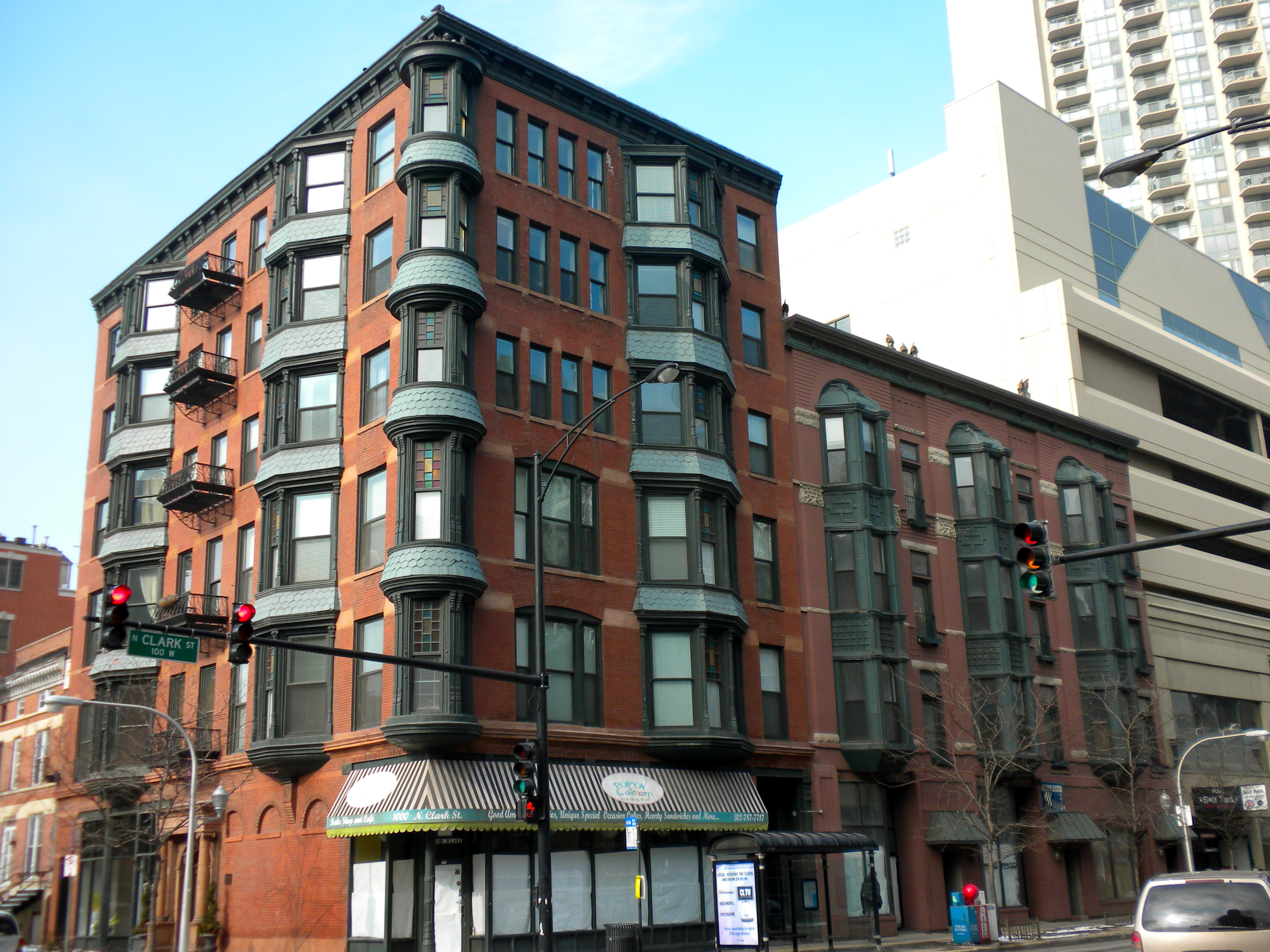

- Location within Illinois Location within the United States
- Location: 104 W. Oak St., Chicago, Illinois
- Coordinates: 41°54′4″N 87°37′54″W
- Area: less than one acre
- Built: 1883
- Architect: Alfred Smith
- Architectural style: Victorian
- NRHP reference No.: 85000264
- Added to NRHP: February 14, 1985

The Burlingham Building is a historic building located at 104 W. Oak Street in the Near North Side neighborhood of Chicago, Illinois. Dentist Luke Burlingham had the building constructed in 1883 to house his professional offices, with apartments on the upper floors. While the building was originally four stories tall, the apartments were successful enough that Burlingham added two more stories of apartments in 1897. Architect Alfred Smith designed the Victorian building; as it faces the corner of Oak and Clark Streets, the building is an example of the common Victorian corner buildings of the era. A cast iron turret on the corner and three matching cast iron bays project from the building; each features slate shingles and colored glass in the central windows. The rest of the building is built from red brick with sandstone trim, with a bracketed cast iron cornice along the roof.

The building was added to the National Register of Historic Places on February 14, 1985.
