= Isaac N. Maynard Rowhouses =

- U.S. National Register of Historic Places
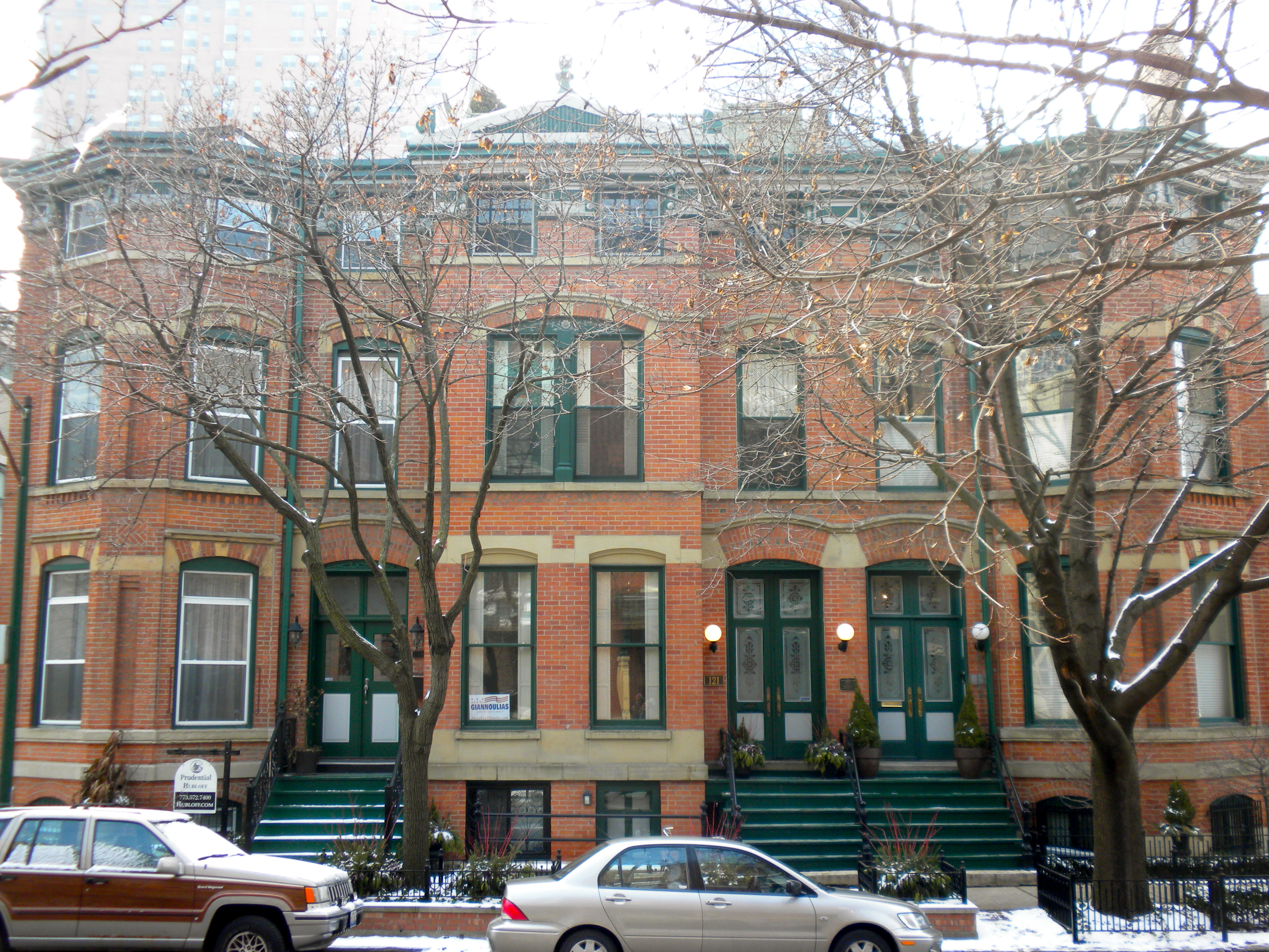

- Location within Chicago metropolitan area Location within Illinois Location within the United States
- Location: 119, 121, 123 W. Delaware Place, Chicago, Illinois
- Coordinates: 41°54′4″N 87°37′57″W
- Area: less than one acre
- Built: 1880-81
- Architect: Treat and Foltz
- Architectural style: Queen Anne
- MPS: Land Subdivisions with Set-Aside Parks, Chicago, IL MPS
- NRHP reference No.: 04000077
- Added to NRHP: February 25, 2004

The Isaac N. Maynard Rowhouses are a group of three connected rowhouses located at 119-123 W. Delaware Place in the Near North Side neighborhood of Chicago, Illinois. The rowhouses were built in 1880-81 by Isaac N. Maynard, one of many developers who helped rebuild the residential area around Washington Square after the Great Chicago Fire. The architecture firm of Treat and Foltz designed the homes in the Queen Anne style with additional details from the Eastlake and Victorian Gothic styles. The brick homes feature projecting bays of different shapes and stone patterns, which serve to both differentiate the three homes and give the overall building texture. Stone stringcourses and a cornice encircle and visually unify the building.

The rowhouses were added to the National Register of Historic Places on February 25, 2004.
