= America Fore Building =

- U.S. National Register of Historic Places
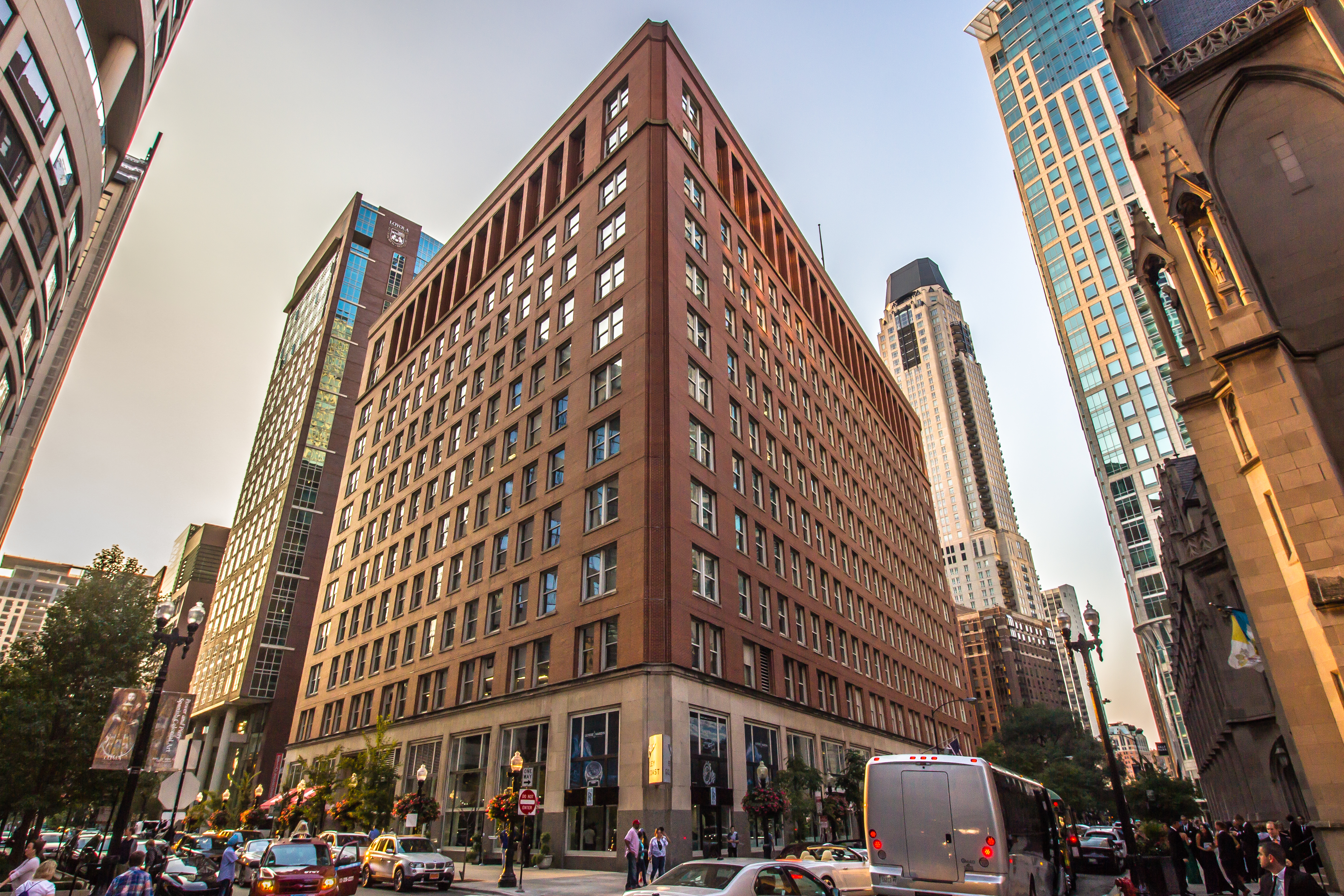

- Location within Chicago metropolitan area Location within Illinois Location within the United States
- Location: 844 N. Rush Street, Chicago, Illinois
- Coordinates: 41°53′53″N 87°37′34″W
- Built: 1923
- NRHP reference No.: 16000383
- Added to NRHP: June 21, 2016

The America Fore Building is a historic office building located at 844 N. Rush Street in the Near North Side neighborhood of Chicago, Illinois. The building was built in 1923 for the America Fore group, a group of four insurance companies with shared leadership. In the early 20th century, commercial development north of the Chicago River was guided first by the Burnham Plan in 1909 and later by the North Central Business District Association, which commissioned a plan of the area in 1919. While the Association mainly focused on development along Michigan Avenue, it also made plans for the surrounding neighborhood, and the America Fore Building was built according to these plans. The building is twelve stories tall, only two higher than the Association's set limit for Michigan Avenue, and features a similar design with stone cladding and large showroom windows.

The building was added to the National Register of Historic Places on June 21, 2016.
