= Fairbanks, Morse and Company Building =

- U.S. National Register of Historic Places
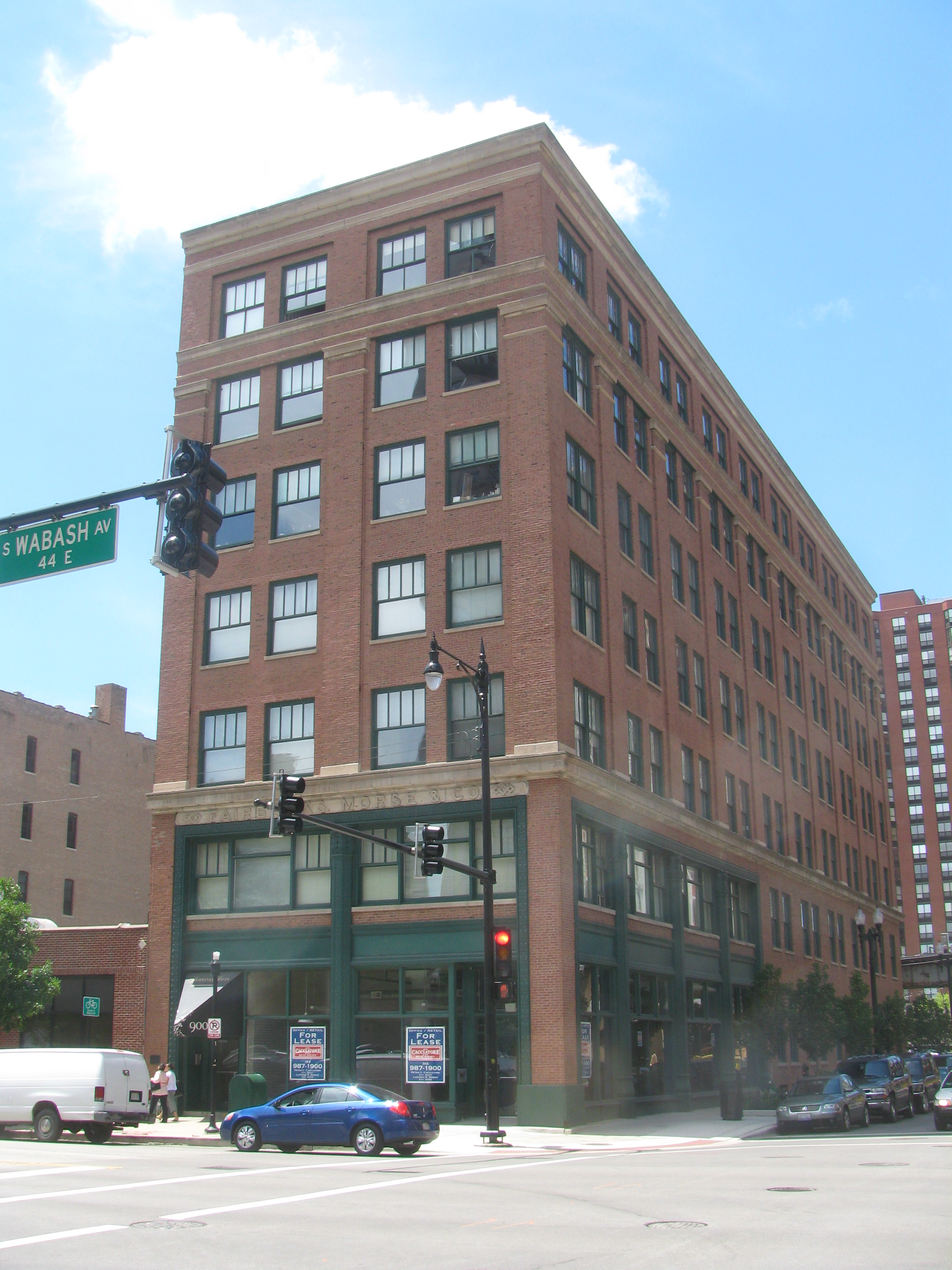

- Location within Illinois Location within the United States
- Location: 900 S. Wabash Ave., Chicago, Illinois
- Coordinates: 41°52′13″N 87°37′34″W
- Area: less than one acre
- Built: 1907
- Architect: Eckstorm, Christian
- Architectural style: Chicago school
- NRHP reference No.: 88002233
- Added to NRHP: November 16, 1988

The Fairbanks, Morse and Company Building is a historic commercial building located at 900 S. Wabash Ave. in the South Loop, Chicago, Illinois. The building served as the national headquarters of Fairbanks, Morse and Company from 1907 to 1937. The company sold a variety of agricultural equipment; while it was originally known for its scales, by 1907 it was best known for producing internal combustion engines. At its peak, the company was one of the largest engine makers in the world, and it was particularly dominant in the diesel engine market. The headquarters building is a seven-story Chicago school building designed by Christian Eckstorm. While the company moved to a larger headquarters at 606 S. Michigan Ave. in 1937, the Wabash Avenue building is the best-preserved remnant of its historic significance and still bears the company's name above the second floor.

The building was added to the National Register of Historic Places on November 16, 1988.
