= Somerset Hotel =

Hotel in Chicago, Illinois

- U.S. National Register of Historic Places
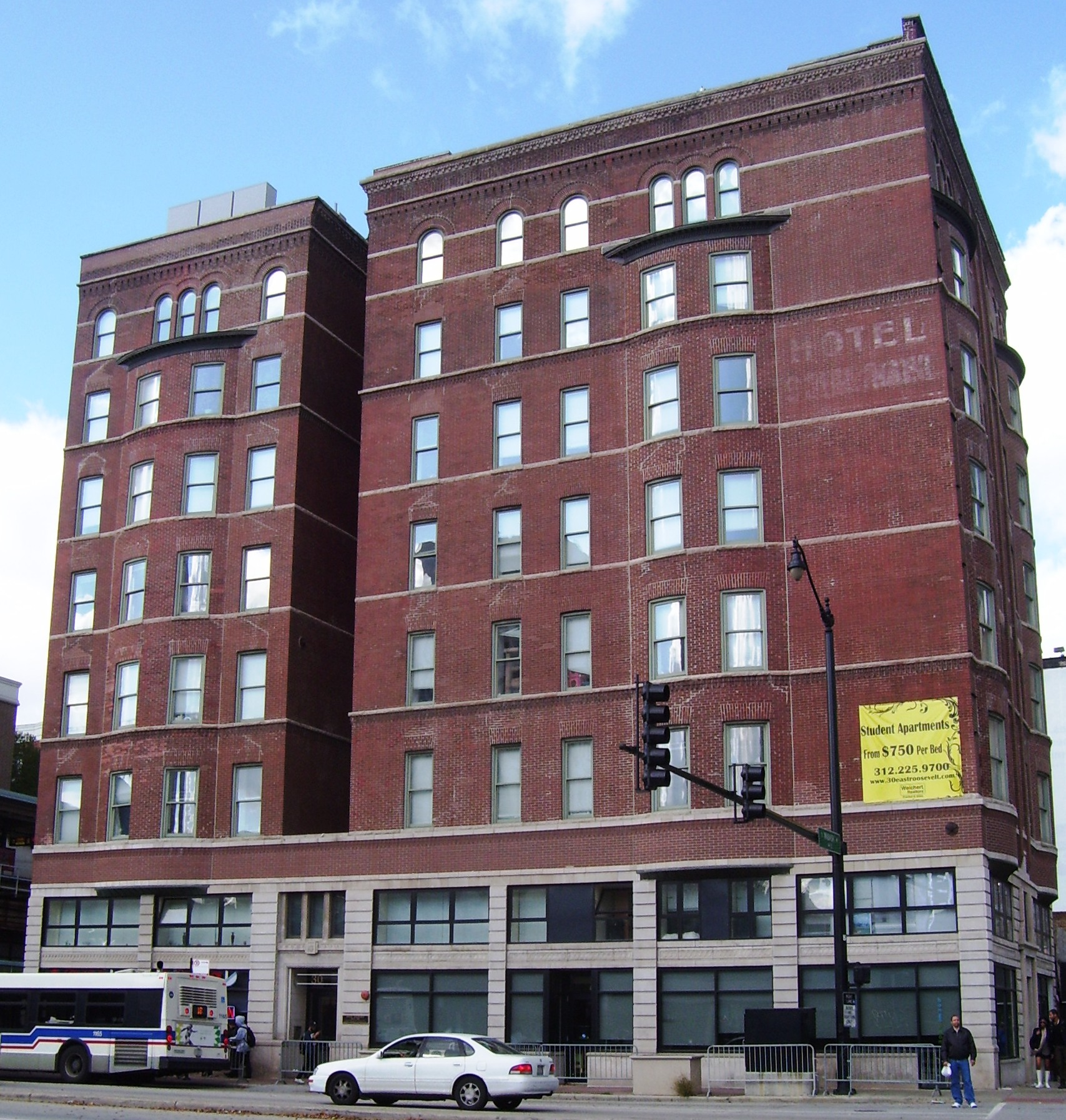

- Location within Chicago metropolitan area Location within Illinois Location within the United States
- Location: 1152-1154 S. Wabash Ave., Chicago, Illinois
- Coordinates: 41°52′4″N 87°37′34″W
- Area: 0.1 acres (0.040 ha)
- Built: 1892–93
- Architect: De Horvath, Jules
- Architectural style: Romanesque
- NRHP reference No.: 00000153
- Added to NRHP: March 3, 2000

The Somerset Hotel is a historic hotel building located at 1152-1154 S. Wabash Ave. in downtown Chicago, Illinois. Built in 1892–93, the hotel was originally owned by physician Frank Stringfield. Architect Jules De Horvath designed the hotel in the Romanesque Revival style. De Horvath's design bore similarities to many other Chicago buildings, most notably the 1888 Virginia Hotel at Ohio and Rush Streets. The Somerset Hotel was a significant part of a hotel and commercial district which formed between the 12th Street station on the South Side Elevated Railroad and Central Station. The hotel changed its name to the Mayer Hotel in 1910; in the 1920s, it again changed its name to the Hotel Roosevelt, which it was called until the 1990s.

The hotel was added to the National Register of Historic Places on March 3, 2000.
