= Jackson Boulevard =

Street in Chicago

- Jackson Drive; Jackson Street; 300 South
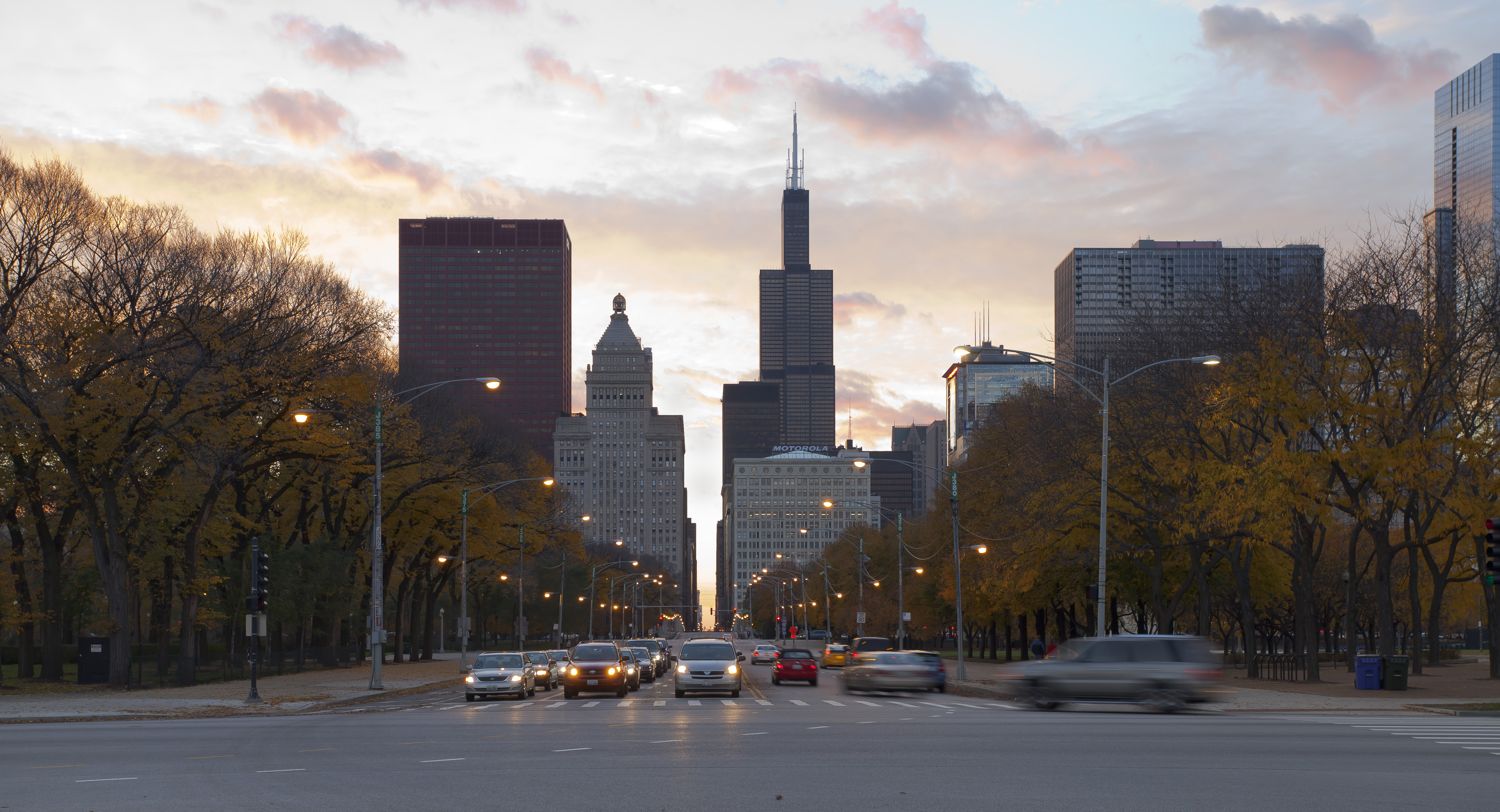
- Jackson Drive at DuSable Lake Shore Drive
- Interactive map of Jackson Boulevard
- Part of: Historic Route 66 from Ogden Avenue to Michigan Avenue in Chicago
- Location: DuPage and Cook counties, Illinois, United States
- Coordinates: 41.8771°N 87.7206°W
- West end: Westmore-Meyers Road / Lombard Circle in Lombard
- Major junctions: Summit Avenue in Villa Park; Hawthorne Avenue in Elmhurst; York Street in Elmhurst; Kearsage Avenue in Elmhurst; Chatham Avenue in Elmhurst; Hillside Avenue in Hillside; I-290 / IL 110 (CKC) in Hillside; 50th Avenue / Madison Avenue in Hillside; Mannheim Road at the Hillside–Bellwood line; Cernan Road in Bellwood; Madison Street at the River Forest–Forest Park line; Historic US 66 in Near West Side, Chicago; I-90 / I-94 in Near West Side, Chicago
- East end: US 41 in the Chicago Loop

Jackson Boulevard is a street in Chicago, in whose grid system it is 300 South. Named for President Andrew Jackson, it is adjacent to Van Buren Street named for Jackson's associate Martin Van Buren. Jackson Boulevard is also a street that parallels the Chicago–Kansas City Expressway.

The Jackson Boulevard Bridge carries it across the Chicago River. It was the first bridge on U.S. Route 66.
