= Singer Building (Chicago) =

Office building in Chicago, Illinois

- U.S. National Register of Historic Places
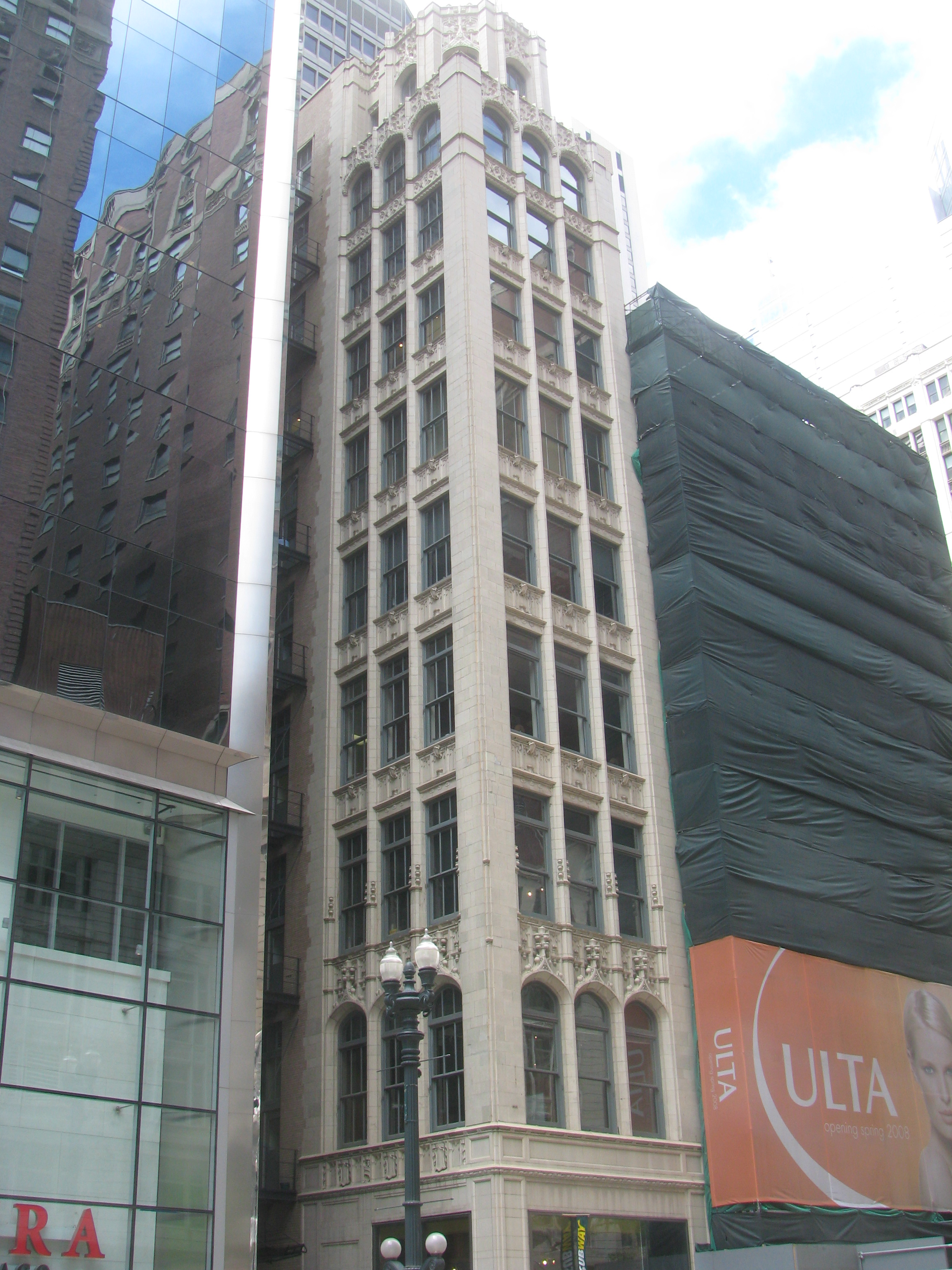

- Location within Chicago metropolitan area Location within Illinois Location within the United States
- Location: 120 S. State St., Chicago, Illinois
- Coordinates: 41°52′48″N 87°37′41″W
- Area: less than one acre
- Built: 1925–26
- Architect: Mundie, William Bryce; Jensen, Elmer C.
- Architectural style: Late Gothic Revival
- NRHP reference No.: 83000314
- Added to NRHP: February 10, 1983

The Singer Building is a skyscraper located at 120 S. State St. in the Loop community area of Chicago, Illinois. The ten-story building was designed by Mundie & Jensen and built from 1925 to 1926. The building's Gothic Revival design features terra cotta decorations, piers at the corners, and sets of three double-hung windows on each story separated by two thin piers. The Singer Corporation initially used the building as office space; the building has had many owners since the Singer Corporation left the building, and was nearly demolished in the 1970s. It is currently owned by FDN Network.

The Singer Building was added to the National Register of Historic Places on February 10, 1983.
