= LaSalle Street =

Street in Chicago, Illinois

Coordinates: 41°52′43.2″N 87°37′56.1″W

- 140 West
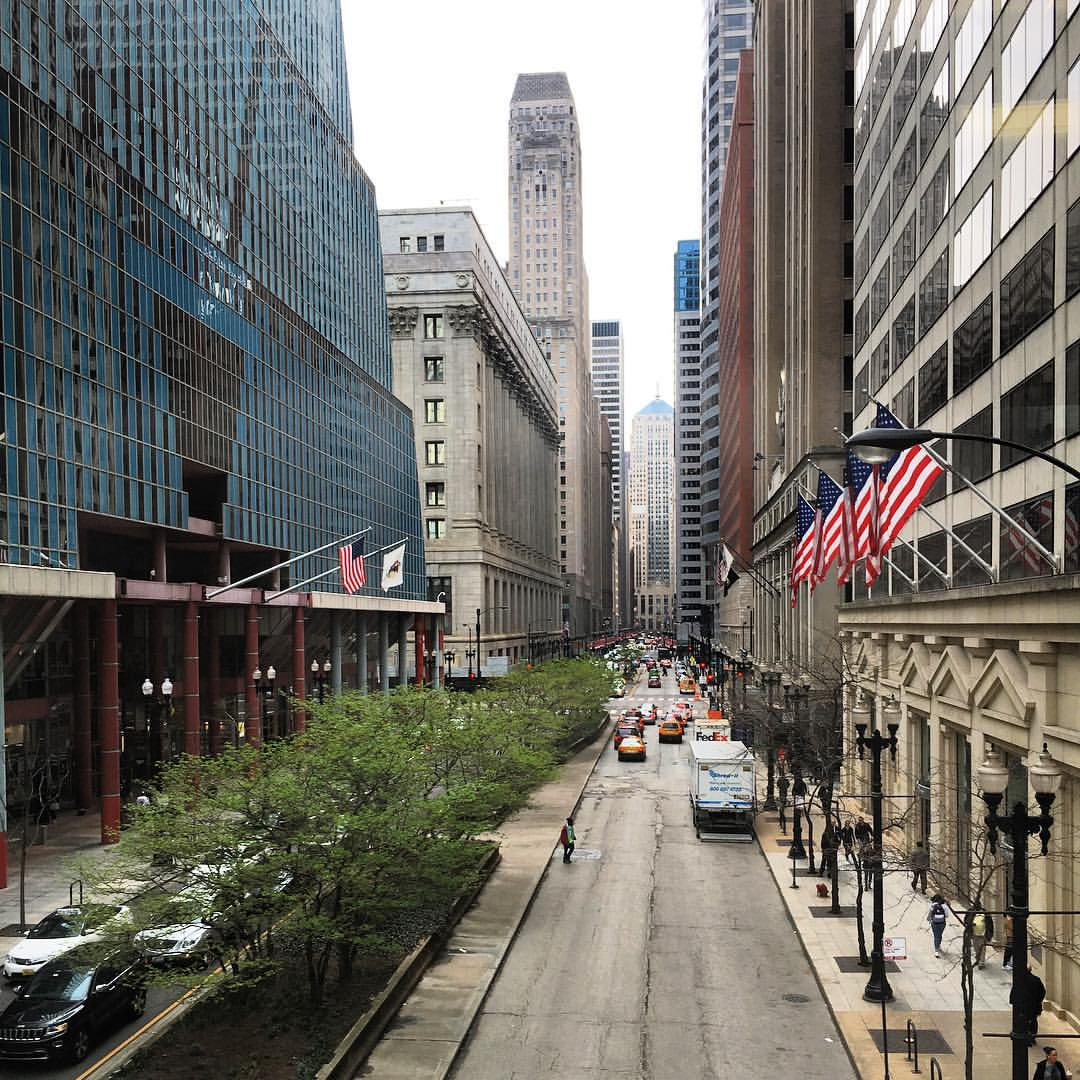
- LaSalle Street with the Chicago Board of Trade Building in the background
- Interactive map of LaSalle Street
- Part of: IL 64
- Location: Chicago
- South end: 162nd Street, in South Holland
- North end: Lake Shore Drive at 1700 North

LaSalle Street is a major north-south street in Chicago named for René-Robert Cavelier, Sieur de La Salle, a 17th-century French explorer of the Illinois Country. The portion that runs through the Chicago Loop is considered to be Chicago's financial district.

== Route description ==
=== South Side ===
South of the Financial District, LaSalle Street gets cut off for a while by the Amtrak/Metra Rail yard from Taylor St to 1600 South. It runs parallel to the Rock Island District Metra line. South of 26th Street, it serves as a frontage road for the Dan Ryan Expressway until 47th street, where it merges with Wentworth Avenue. South of 47th, it starts and stops as a local street until it finally terminates at Sibley Boulevard in Dolton.

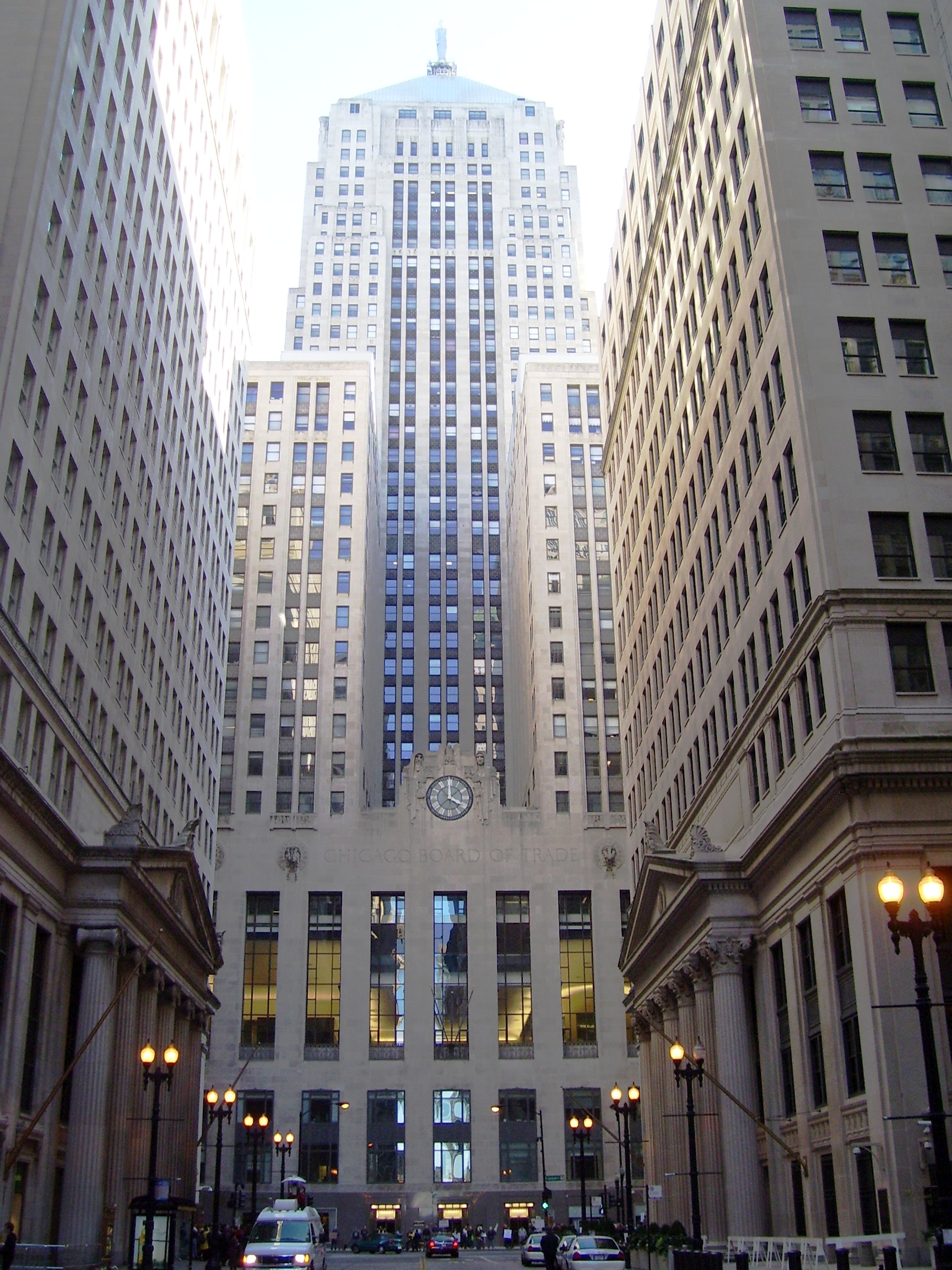
The Chicago Board of Trade Building (center), the Continental Illinois Building (left) and the Federal Reserve Bank of Chicago (right)

=== In the Loop ===
The stretch of LaSalle Street and its adjacent buildings in the Loop is recognized as the West Loop–LaSalle Street Historic District. The south end of LaSalle Street terminates at the art-deco Chicago Board of Trade Building, a Chicago Landmark and National Historic Landmark. The LaSalle Street Station commuter terminal is located directly south of the Board of Trade. An art deco skyscraper at 135 S. LaSalle and a modern skyscraper 190 S. LaSalle line the street. One North LaSalle, the former Field Building, Chicago City Hall and the James R. Thompson Center are located within the Loop on LaSalle Street. Until 1971, the Chicago Stock Exchange Building was at LaSalle and Washington.

The street was nicknamed "The Canyon" due to the tall, steep buildings that stand on both sides of the relatively narrow street, with the Chicago Board of Trade Building as the abrupt end of the apparent box canyon.

The Rookery Building is a historic landmark located at 219 South LaSalle Street. Completed by John Wellborn Root and Daniel Burnham of Burnham and Root in 1888, it is considered one of their masterpiece buildings. It measures 181 feet (55 m), is twelve stories tall and is one of the oldest standing high-rises in Chicago. It has a unique style with exterior load-bearing walls and an interior steel frame.

LaSalle was one of three streets in Chicago to have a tunnel under the Chicago River, the other two being W. Washington St. and W. Van Buren St. Constructed in 1869-71, the 2,000-foot (610 m) long tunnel alleviated interruptions from bridge openings due to heavy river traffic and served as an escape route during the Great Chicago Fire of 1871. Originally open to only pedestrians and private vehicles, the LaSalle tunnel was turned over to cable car companies in the 1880s, since it was impossible for cable car systems to span the movable bridges. Closed in 1906, the tunnel was deepened and reopened to electric street car traffic in 1911-12. The tunnel was closed permanently in 1939 to make way for subway construction.

In 2023, the City of Chicago approved a series of plans to convert buildings on LaSalle Street from office space to residential. In total, plans have been approved to convert five office buildings into residential spaces with 1,600 apartments, 600 of which will be affordable housing.

=== North of the river ===
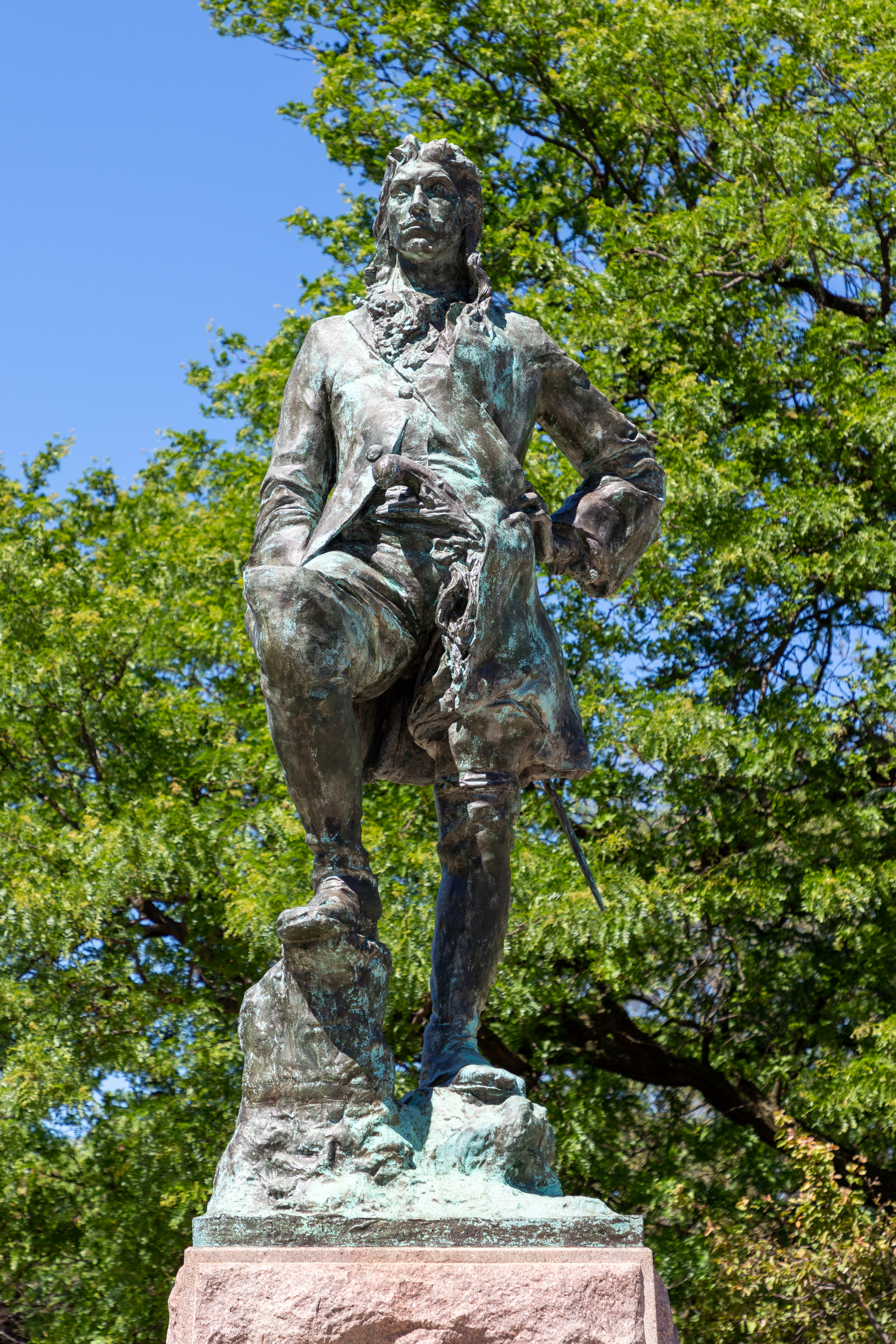
LaSalle Monument in Lincoln Park, overlooking northern terminus of LaSalle Drive

Moving north from the Loop, the street crosses the Chicago River using the La Salle Street Bridge. In the Near North Side, 300 North LaSalle is located on the north banks of the Chicago River, one block east of the Merchandise Mart. The street passes mostly commercial buildings, as well as, the Annunciation Greek Orthodox Cathedral.

The street becomes a tree-lined divided boulevard north of Chicago Avenue, the streetscape also becomes more residential. On the corner at Chicago Avenue, LaSalle is adjacent to the entrance of Moody Bible Institute. The street ends 10-blocks north, in Lincoln Park, just past its intersection with North Avenue, where Moody Church stands on the east side of LaSalle. North of the river until the terminus at DuSable Lake Shore Drive, City of Chicago signage refers to LaSalle Street as “LaSalle Drive.”

== Transportation ==
As a frontage road of I-90/I-94 (Dan Ryan Expressway), LaSalle Street accommodates bus routes heading due north, either as a through route (CTA bus route 24) or to connect to one of several Red Line stations along the way (CTA bus routes 31, 39, and 43). In the downtown area, three stations are present in between Harrison Street and Van Buren Street: LaSalle Street Station on the Rock Island District line, LaSalle station on the Blue Line, and LaSalle/Van Buren station on the Loop Elevated. As LaSalle Street becomes a throughfare through downtown, CTA bus routes 134, 135, and 136 run from Jackson Boulevard or Adams Street to Upper Wacker Drive. CTA bus route 156 runs through nearly the whole arterial section (from Jackson Boulevard or Adams Street to Stockton Drive). Bus routes 72 and 151 briefly runs along LaSalle Drive in Lincoln Park.

== In popular culture ==
The street, Chicago Board of Trade Building, and 200 North LaSalle were used in the 2005 film Batman Begins, its sequel The Dark Knight, and the 2022 film The Batman, as well as in the 1999 movie Payback. The view facing south down the canyon has been used in the movies The Untouchables, Public Enemies, Transformers 3: Dark of the Moon and Road to Perdition. The canyon was in the movie Ferris Bueller's Day Off.

== Major intersections ==
=== In the Chicago Loop ===
The entire route is in Chicago, Cook County.

mi	km	Destinations	Notes
0.0	0.0	Historic US 66 (Jackson Boulevard)	Southern terminus
0.6	0.97	La Salle Street Bridge/Marshall Suloway Bridge	
2.3	3.7	IL 64 west (North Avenue)	South end of IL 64 concurrency
2.5	4.0	Stockton Drive – Lincoln Park	
2.7	4.3	US 41 / LMCT (DuSable Lake Shore Drive) / IL 64 ends	North end of IL 64 concurrency, northern terminus
1.000 mi = 1.609 km; 1.000 km = 0.621 mi: Concurrency terminus
