= Museum Park =

Museum Park or Park Museum may refer to:

Skyscrapers

- One Museum Park in Chicago, Illinois, U.S.
  - One Museum Park West in Chicago
- Ten Museum Park in Miami, Florida, U.S.

Museums

- Clifton Park Museum in Rotherham, South Yorkshire, England
- Weston Park Museum in Sheffield, England

Parks

- Museum Park (Miami), a park in Miami
- Forest Park Museum and Arboretum in Perry, Iowa, U.S.

Other

- Museum Park station, a Metromover station in Miami
