= Fogelson =

Fogelson is a surname. Notable people with the surname include:

- Buddy Fogelson (1900–1987), American lawyer and businessman
- Gerald Fogelson (born 1933), American real estate developer and author
- Jeff Fogelson (1947–2018), American athlete director
- Raymond D. Fogelson (1933–2020), American anthropologist
- Robert M. Fogelson (born 1937), American urban historian
