= Central Station, Chicago =

Neighborhood of Chicago, Illinois

Coordinates: 41°51′44″N 87°37′14″W

- Neighborhood
- One Museum Park & One Museum Park West and the northern part of the Central Station sales model
- Interactive map of Central Station, Chicago
- Country: United States
- City: Chicago, Illinois
- Community area: Near South Side, Chicago
- First settled: 1990

Central Station is a residential development project in South Loop, Chicago. Originally planned as a 69 acres (28 ha) development, it was later expanded to 72 acres (29 ha), and is now 80 acres (32 ha). Being planned by the city government, it encompasses the former rail yards and air space rights east of Michigan Avenue between Roosevelt Road and 18th Street.

== Background ==
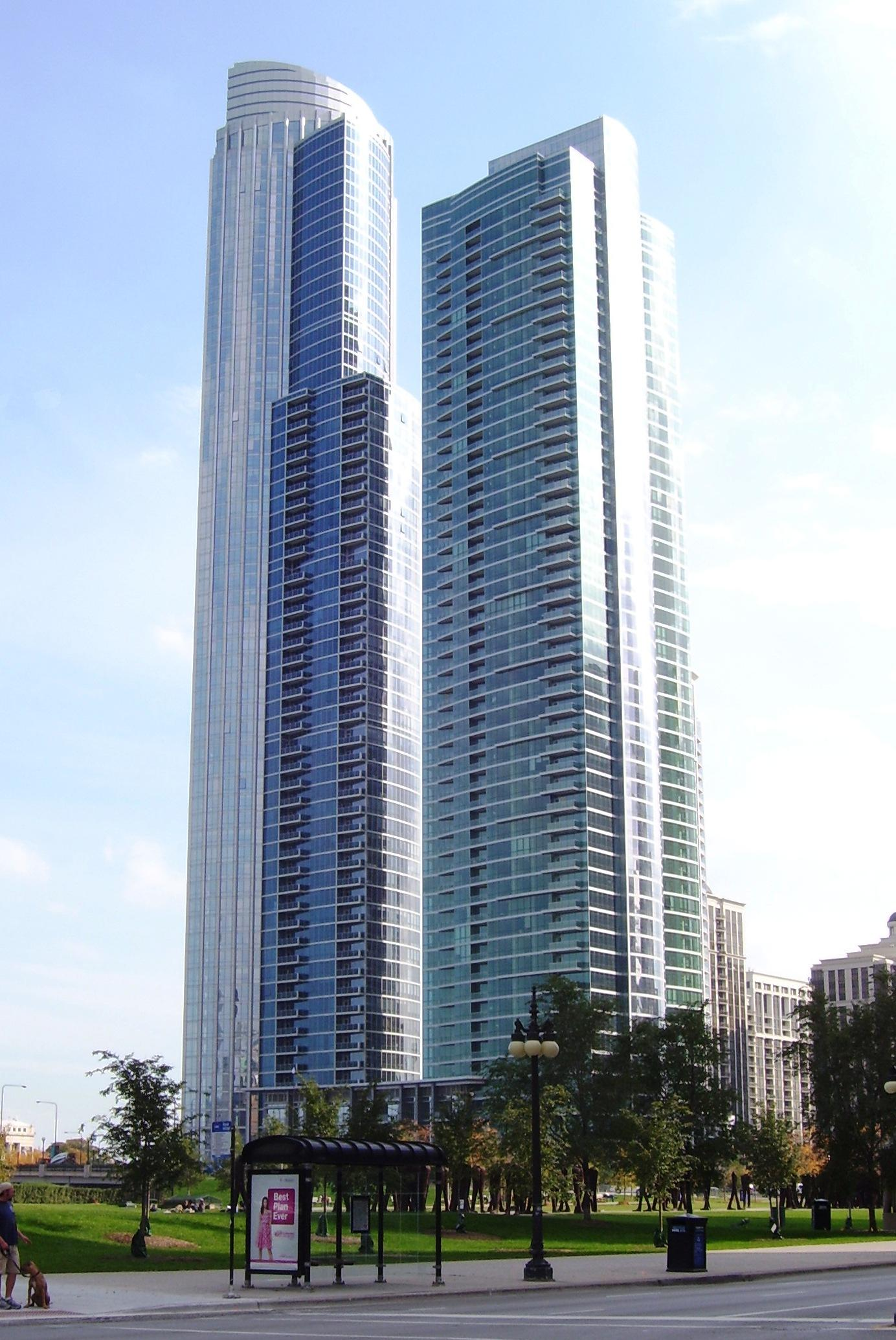
One Museum Park (left) and One Museum Park West (right), high-rise condominium apartment buildings in Chicago, Illinois, south of Grant Park, on East Roosevelt Road.

Formerly, Central Station was an intercity passenger terminal in downtown Chicago, located at the southern end of Grant Park at Roosevelt Road and Michigan Avenue, which is the northwest corner of the new neighborhood. The neighborhood is evolving according to a City of Chicago planned development.

=== Planned development ===
Central Station had been a warehouse district prior to the planned development led by Gerald W. Fogelson, founder and president of Fogelson Companies and co-chairman and CEO of the Central Station Development Corporation. Redevelopment began in 1990. In 1994, Central Station started to take its residential shape with the construction of luxury townhomes. More recently, this lakefront neighborhood has experienced rapid construction of more luxury townhomes, high-rise condominiums, apartments and retail stores. Fogelson proposed a plan to overhaul the warehouse district with a modern residential district and has successfully acquired the property and subcontracted residential, and mixed-use development.

Museum Park at Central Station is one of the largest of the subcontracted developments. It is a complex of multiple residential towers within the Central Station development at the southern edge of Grant Park, across Lake Shore Drive from Chicago's Museum Campus. It includes One Museum Park and One Museum Park West as well as Museum Park Place, Museum Park Club, Museum Park Towers I-IV, Museum Park Lofts I & II, 1400 Museum Park and luxury townhomes. Other developments in Central Station include Lakeside Tower at 1600 South Indiana. In 2006, the Prairie District Neighborhood Alliance, a non-profit organization was formed to provide representation for thousands of South Loop residents, which includes Central Station and Museum Park. In 2017, One Grant Park began construction near Roosevelt Road and Michigan Avenue.

Among the earliest residents of the newly redeveloped Central Station was the now-former Chicago Mayor Richard M. Daley.
