= The Grant =

Condominium building in Chicago, Illinois

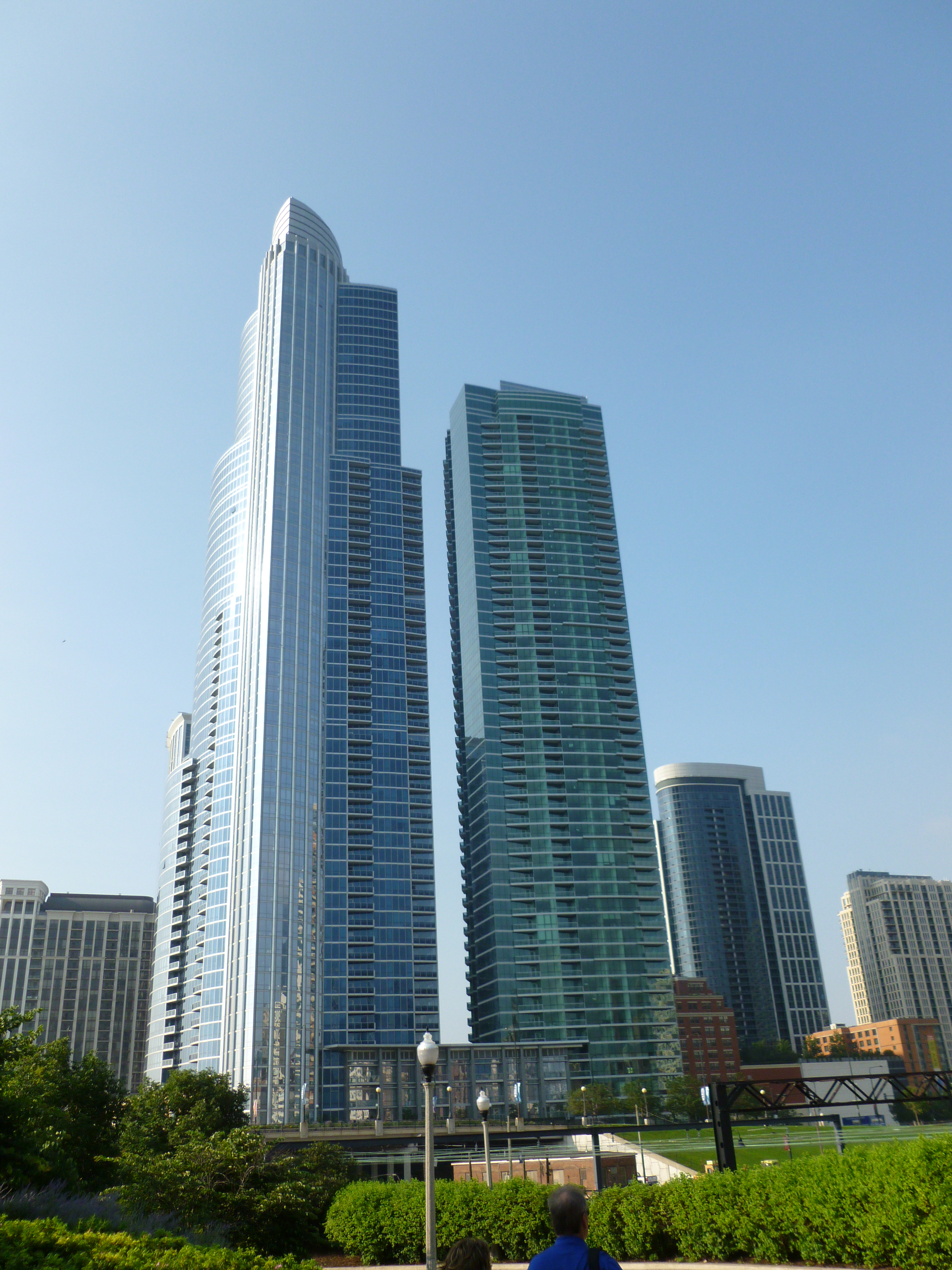
- One Museum Park (on the left) and The Grant (on the right)
- Interactive map of the The Grant area
- Former names: One Museum Park West

General information
- Status: Completed
- Type: Residential
- Location: Roosevelt Road and Indiana Avenue; Chicago, Illinois
- Coordinates: 41.867100°N 87.622250°W
- Construction started: March 2007
- Opening: July 2010

Height
- Tip: 181 metres (594 ft)
- Roof: 180.09 metres (590.8 ft)
- Top floor: 161.89 metres (531.1 ft)

Technical details
- Floor count: 54
- Floor area: 92,987 m^{2} (1,000,900 ft^{2})

Design and construction
- Architects: Pappageorge/Haymes, Ltd.

The Grant (formerly One Museum Park West) is the companion structure to One Museum Park in the Near South Side community area (neighborhood) in Chicago, Illinois, United States. It is located at the north end of the Central Station development.

== Overview ==
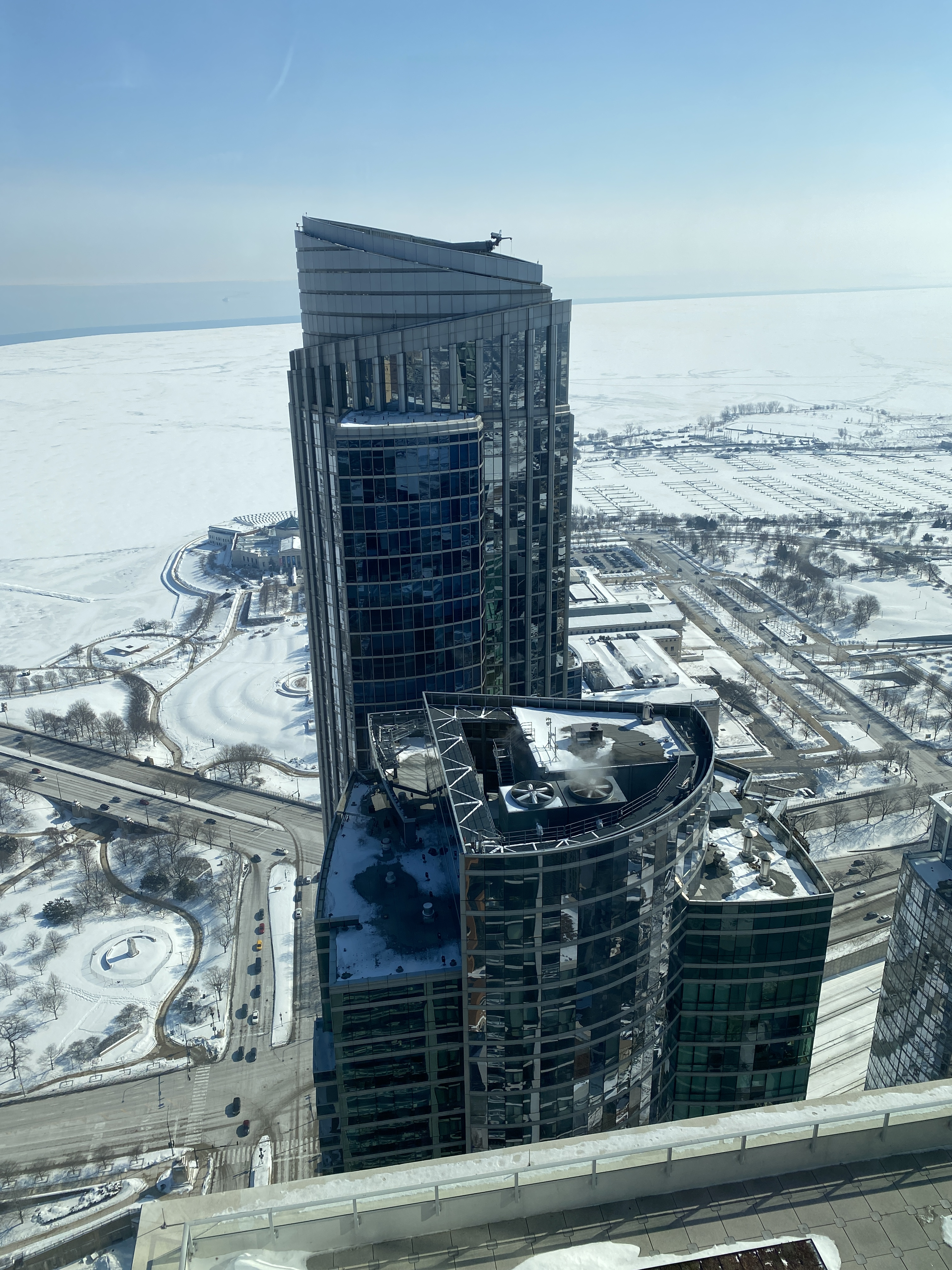
View of the top of the building from NEMA in 2021 with One Museum Park behind it

Museum Park is a complex of multiple residential towers within the Central Station development at the southern edge of Grant Park, across Lake Shore Drive from Chicago's Museum Campus. Construction of The Grant followed the 62-story One Museum Park, directly to the east. In 2006, the Prairie District Neighborhood Alliance, a non-profit organization was formed to provide representation for thousands of South Loop residents, including the Prairie District, Central Station and Museum Park, Motor Row, the South Michigan Ave Corridor, as well as other areas of the Near South Side.

In July 2012, the building was acquired by New York–based Related Companies along with the former 1600 Museum Park and Museum Park Place 2 and later renamed The Grant, Adler Place and Harbor View. Nearly all of the 238 unsold units in the building were sold by May 2015.

== Education ==
The building is zoned to schools in the Chicago Public Schools.

- South Loop Elementary School
- Phillips Academy High School
Models

== Gallery ==
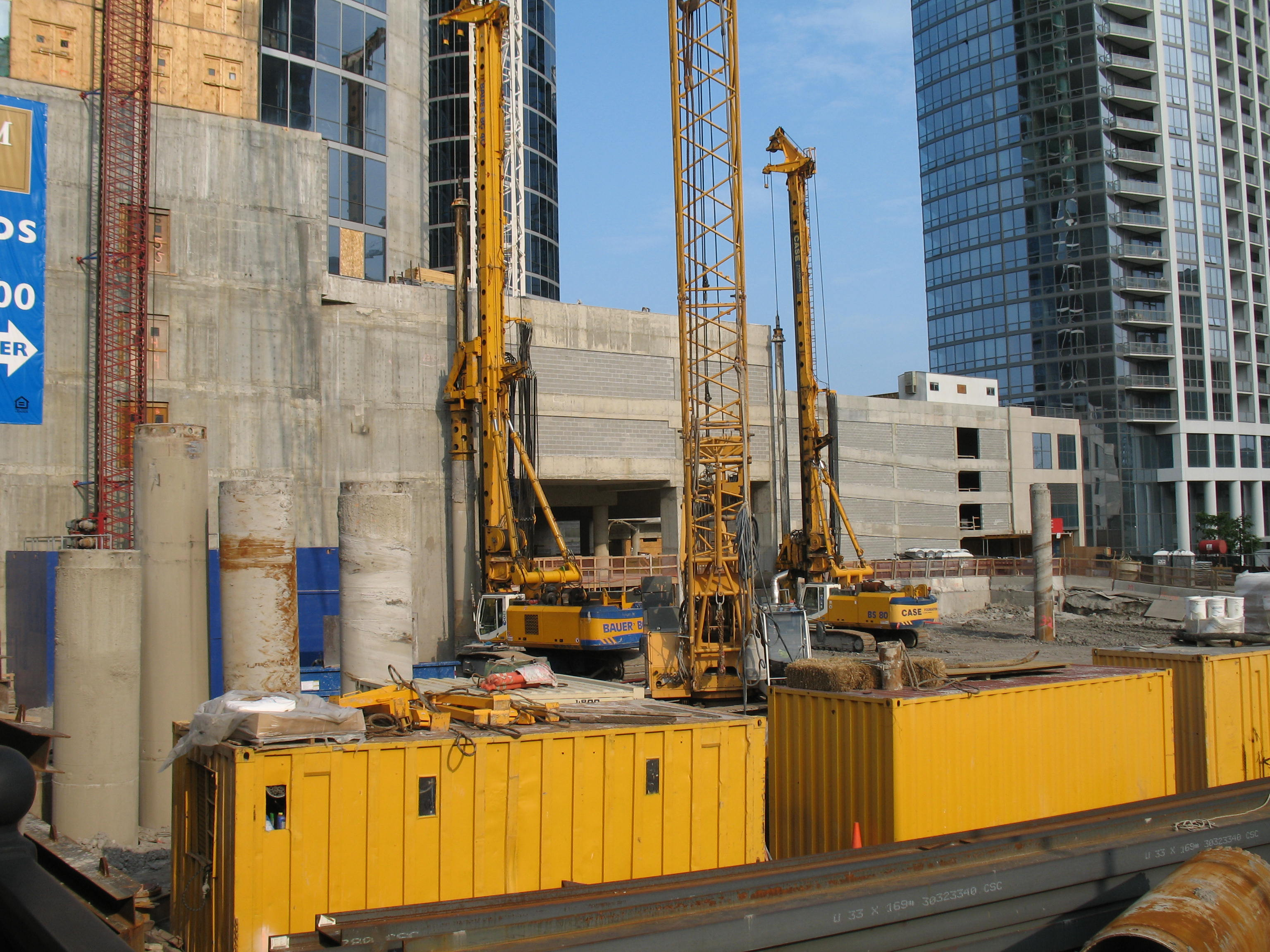
Construction photograph (2007-05-28)

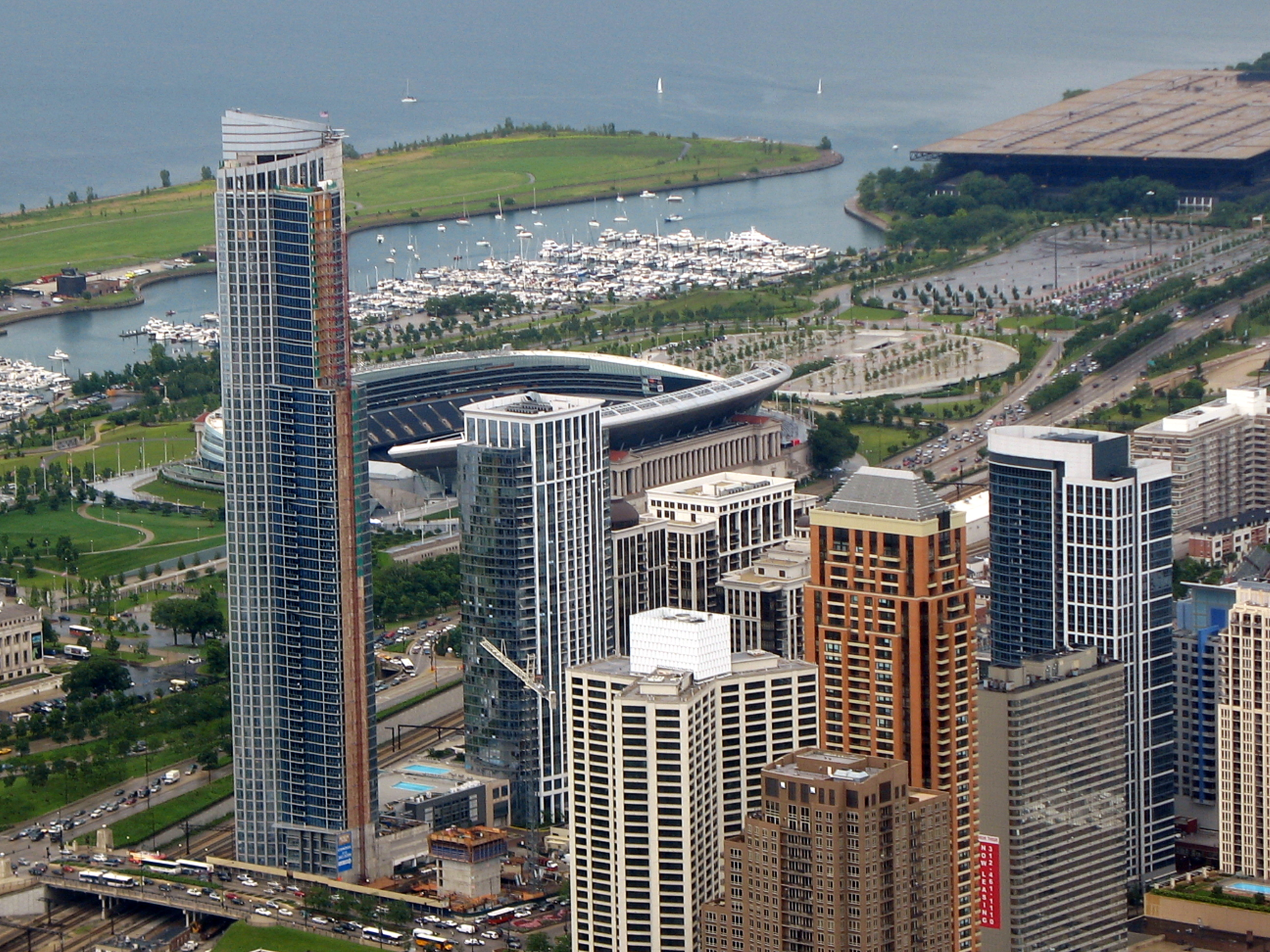
Early construction from Sears Tower (2008-06-20)

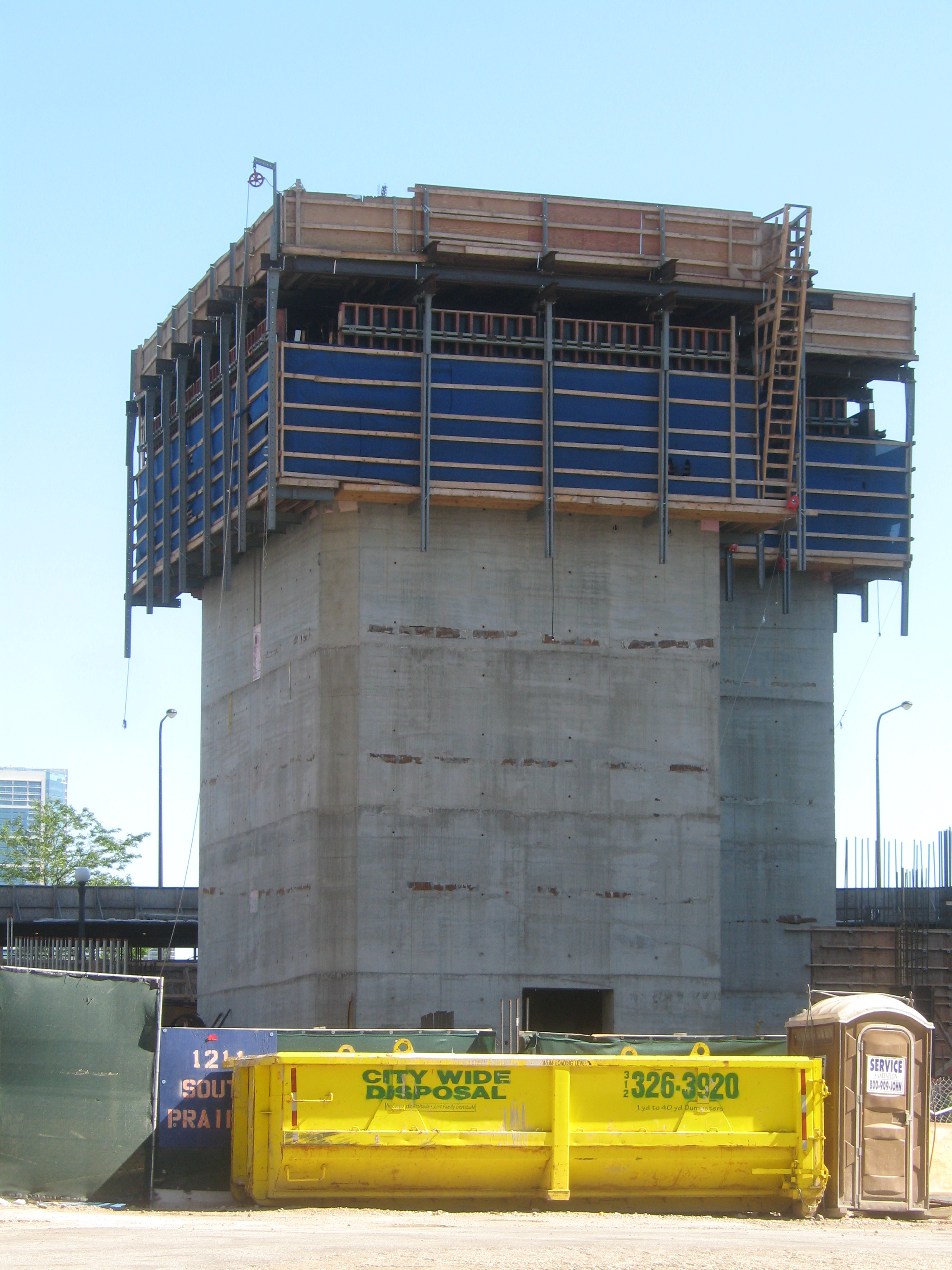
Early construction close-up (2008-07-13)

== See also ==
- List of buildings
- List of skyscrapers
- List of tallest buildings in Chicago
- List of tallest buildings in the United States
- World's tallest structures
