= 113 East Roosevelt (Phase II) =

Canceled skyscraper in Chicago, Illinois

- Location within Chicago metropolitan area

General information
- Status: Never built
- Type: Residential
- Location: East Roosevelt Road, Chicago, IL
- Coordinates: 41.8673°N 87.6227°W
- Management: Crescent Heights

Height
- Roof: undisclosed (>829 feet (252.7 m))

Technical details
- Floor count: undisclosed

Design and construction
- Architect: Rafael Viñoly

Phase II of 113 East Roosevelt was a skyscraper planned for Chicago in the Near South Side community area. It was to be located at the southeast corner of Roosevelt Road and Michigan Avenue, adjacent to the southwest corner of Grant Park. The skyscraper was designed by Rafael Viñoly as the second of a three phase development that included a slightly shorter Phase I NEMA (Chicago) and a 100-unit townhouse development and public park as the third phase. It was planned to have 648 units that were likely to be condominiums. Miami developer Crescent Heights acquired the real estate for the development in 2012 for $29.5 million. The development was presented in a community meeting on September 22, 2015. The Chicago Plan Commission approved the development on November 19, 2015, in a meeting that also resulted in the approval of the Wanda Vista tower. The building was to be located on a 2-acre (8,094 m^{2}) site, with financing as a prerequisite to initial groundbreaking. In 2023, the site of the development went up for sale by the developer, and the building was cancelled.

== See also ==
- List of tallest buildings in Chicago
- List of tallest buildings in the United States
