= Reid House (Chicago) =

Historic house in Illinois, United States

- U.S. National Register of Historic Places
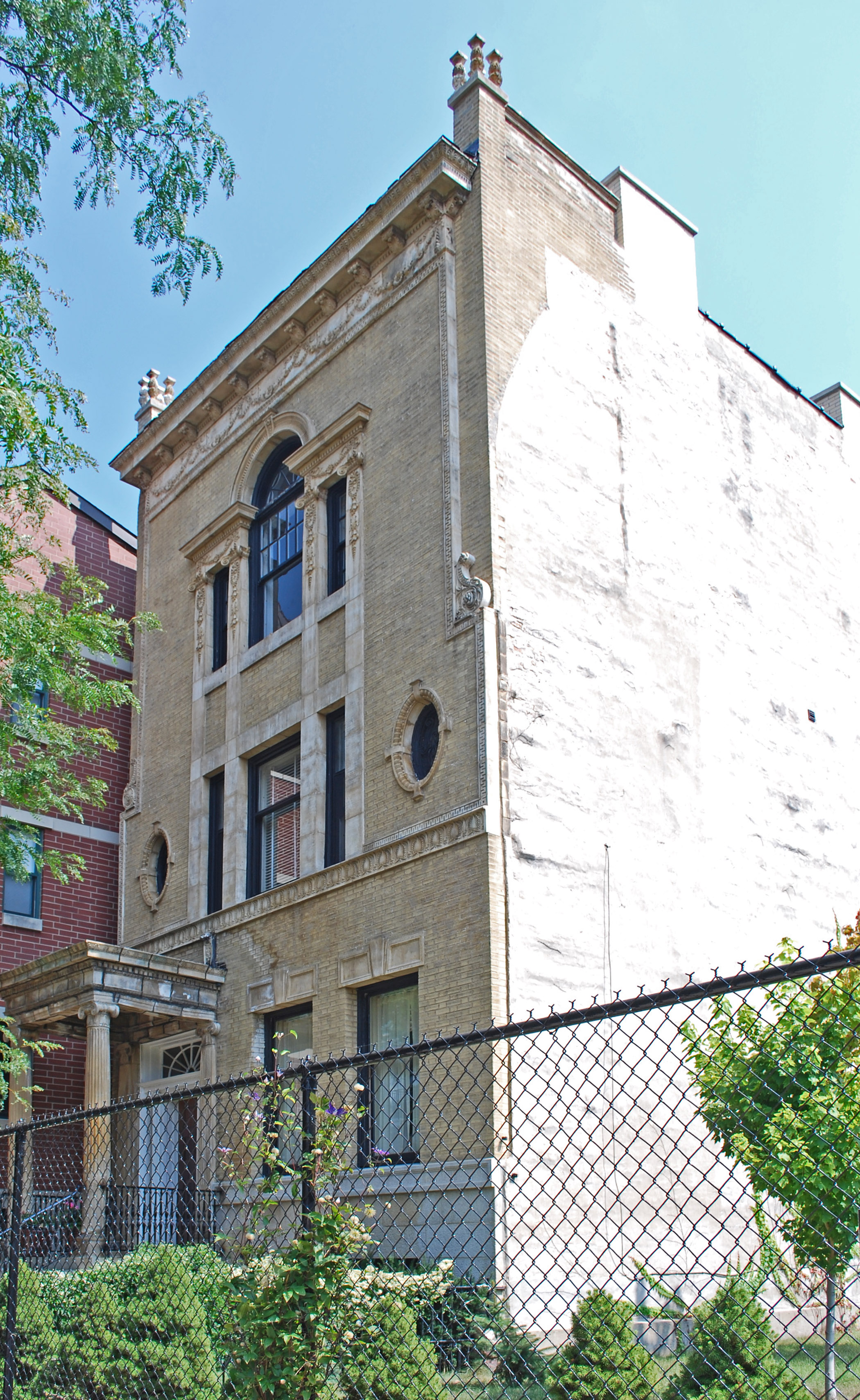

- Location within Chicago metropolitan area Location within Illinois Location within the United States
- Location: 2013 S. Prairie Ave., Chicago, Illinois
- Coordinates: 41°51′19″N 87°37′12″W
- Area: less than one acre
- Built: 1894
- Architect: Beers, Clay and Dutton
- Architectural style: Classical Revival
- NRHP reference No.: 03000783
- Added to NRHP: August 21, 2003

The Reid House is a historic house located at 2013 S. Prairie Avenue in the Near South Side community area of Chicago, Illinois. Built in 1894, the house was designed by the firm Beers, Clay and Dutton in the Classical Revival style. The house's design features a narrow entry portico with Ionic columns and terra cotta decorations, a fanlight and sidelights on the front door, a cornice with a modillion, and Adamesque ornaments. In addition, the house was the first residence built with a steel frame. Chicago businessman William Henry Reid owned the house, which he built to replace his previous home at the same location.

The house was added to the National Register of Historic Places on August 21, 2003.
