= William W. Kimball House =

Historic house in Illinois, United States

- U.S. National Register of Historic Places
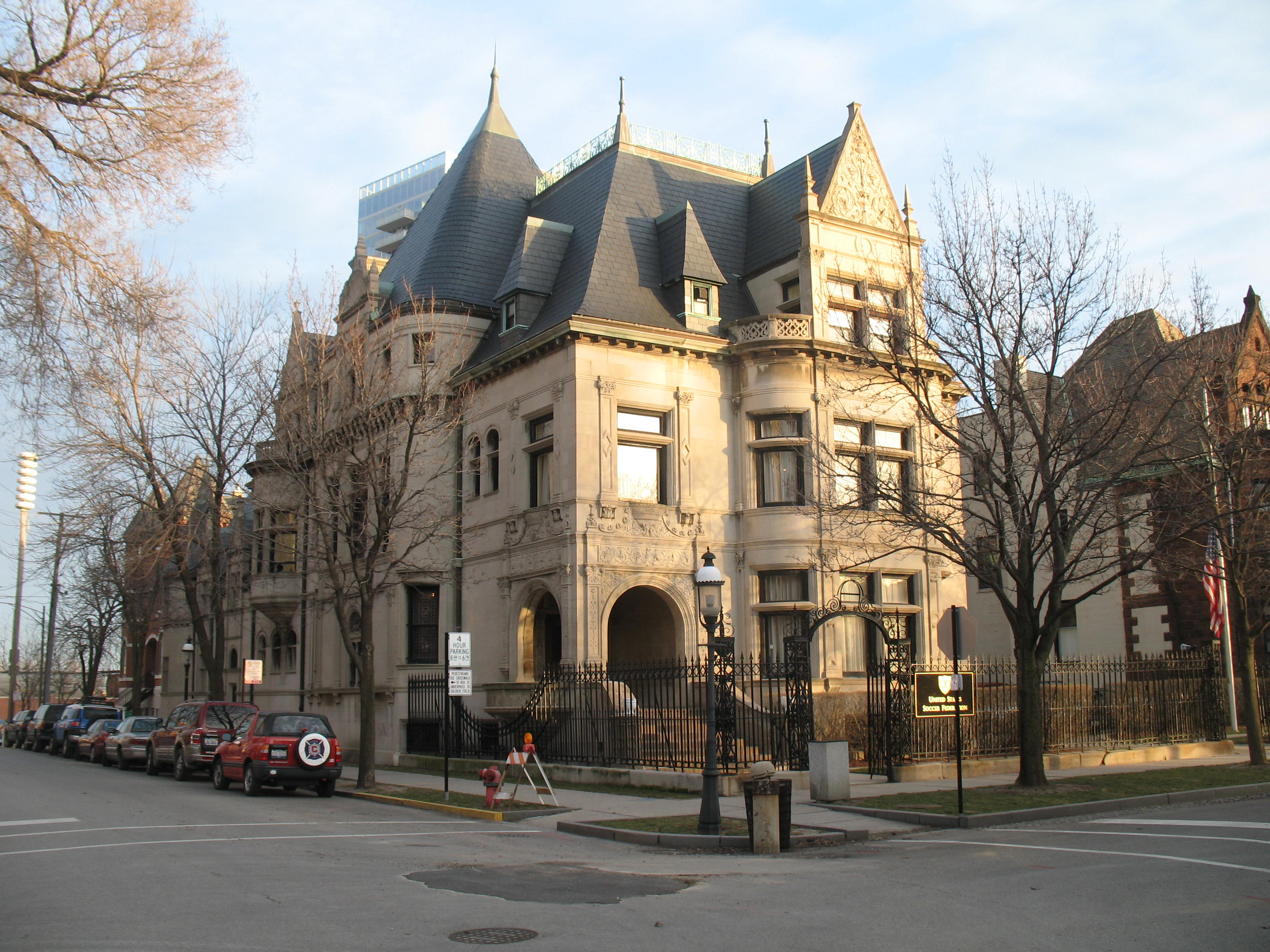

- Location within Chicago metropolitan area Location within Illinois Location within the United States
- Location: 1801 S. Prairie Ave., Chicago, Illinois
- Coordinates: 41°51′24″N 87°37′12″W
- Area: 6.1 acres (2.5 ha)
- Built: 1890–1892; 134 years ago
- Architect: Solon Spencer Beman
- Architectural style: Châteauesque
- NRHP reference No.: 71000291
- Added to NRHP: December 9, 1971

The William W. Kimball House is a private residence located at 1801 Prairie Avenue in the Near South Side neighborhood of Chicago, Illinois. It was added to the National Register of Historic Places on December 9, 1971.

== History ==
The house was built in 1890–1892 for William Wallace Kimball, a piano manufacturer. Kimball reportedly spent $1 million on the home. At the time, Prairie Avenue was known for its expensive homes designed in popular revival styles, and the district was home to many of Chicago's wealthiest residents. The Kimball House and the John J. Glessner House are the main two surviving examples of the district's homes of the late 1800s. Between 1991 and 2022, the house served as the headquarters of the United States Soccer Federation.

== Architecture ==
The Kimball house was designed by architect Solon Spencer Beman in the Châteauesque style. The house's design features a number of turrets with a variety of roof shapes, a limestone exterior, and an elliptical bow window topped by an ornamented gable facing Prairie Avenue. The design is considered a significant example of the Châteauesque style by architectural historians; John Drury called the house "Chicago's best Châteauesque design" in 1941, and Marcus Whiffen cited the house as a representative example of Châteauesque architecture in America.
