= Henry B. Clarke House =

Historic house in Chicago, Illinois

- Clarke-Ford House
- U.S. National Register of Historic Places
- Chicago Landmark
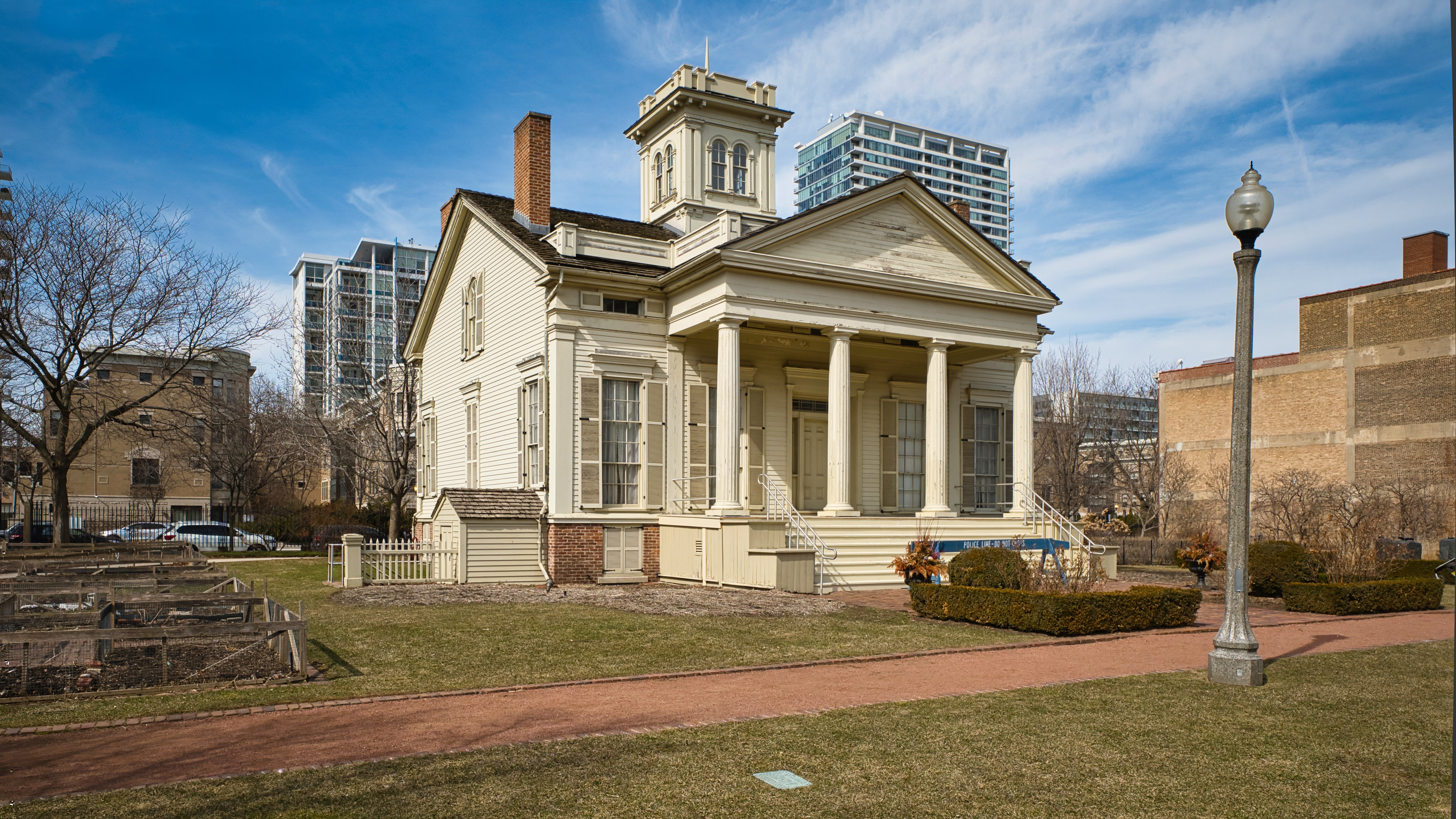
- In March 2022
- Location: 1827 S. Indiana Ave. Chicago, Illinois, United States
- Coordinates: 41°51′26″N 87°37′19″W
- Built: circa 1836
- Architectural style: Greek Revival
- NRHP reference No.: 71000290

Significant dates
- Added to NRHP: 1971
- Designated CHICL: October 14, 1970

The Henry B. and Caroline Clarke/Bishop Louis Henry and Margaret Ford House (a.k.a. the Clarke-Ford House) is a Greek Revival-style house museum in Chicago, Illinois, United States. Built around 1836, it is considered the oldest existing house built in Chicago. Henry Brown Clarke was a native of New York State who had come to Chicago in 1833 with his wife, Caroline Palmer Clarke, and his family. He was in the hardware business with William Jones and Byram King, establishing King, Jones and Company, and provided building materials to the growing Chicago populace. The house was built by a local contractor, probably John C. Rue, who later married the Clarkes' housemaid, Elizabeth (Betsy) Saunders.

Originally built on a large lot near Michigan Avenue and 17th Street, it has been moved twice, most recently in 1977 to Indiana Avenue and 18th Street, near to its original location. In the mid-20th century, it was cared for by a church, its leader Bishop Ford and his wife, Margaret, who spurred its preservation as the city's oldest home. Its current location in a park and gardens is part of the Prairie Avenue Historic District in the Near South Side community area.

== Oldest surviving house in Chicago ==
Clarke-Ford House may have been modeled on the home of William B. Ogden. The house is described as the oldest surviving house in Chicago, although part of the Noble-Seymour-Crippen House in the Norwood Park neighborhood was built in 1833. (However, Norwood Park was not annexed to Chicago until 1893.) The Clarke-Ford House was designated a Chicago Landmark on October 14, 1970. It was added to the National Register of Historic Places on May 6, 1971.

Originally built on 20.08 acres (8.13 ha) of land near Michigan Avenue between 16th and 17th Streets, it is currently located at 1827 S. Indiana, near its original location. Clarke's decision to build south of the River made him the first wealthy Chicagoan to build there. Clarke suffered severe financial setbacks during the Panic of 1837 and used the surrounding land for farming and hunting. This setback resulted in a delay in the completion of the south rooms of his house.

== Widow Clarke's House ==
Clarke died in 1849 after being stricken with cholera. Caroline Palmer Clarke lived until 1860 and it was during this time that the house was known as the "Widow Clarke's House". After her husband's death, Caroline Clarke established "Clarke's addition to Chicago" by selling all but 3 acres (12,000 m^{2}) of the original land that went with the house. She used this money to support her family and renovate her house, adding an elaborate back portico with Doric columns, much like the original portico facing the lake. The new porch faced the newly gaslit Michigan Avenue. At the same time, she added an Italianate cupola and decorated her dining room and front parlor, which remained unfinished from the time of the family's financial setbacks.

In 1871 John Chrimes, a prominent Chicago tailor, purchased the house and moved it farther south to 45th Street and Wabash Avenue into what was then the township of Hyde Park. When the house was being moved, a packet of papers was discovered that Clarke had apparently buried when building the house. The packet contained a memorial to President Martin van Buren recommending Henry Clarke for a job, tax receipts, newspapers of the day, and a statement in Henry Clarke's handwriting, stating, "I, Henry B. Clarke, am an ardent Democrat." In the 20th century, the building came into the hands of the St. Paul Church of God in Christ. As the parsonage and community hall of this church, the Clarke House was the working home of Bishop Louis Henry Ford, the man for whom the Bishop Ford Freeway would later be named. Ford did much to preserve and repair the structure, and worked to bring its history to the attention of the city.

== Another move ==
In 1977, the City of Chicago purchased the house and moved it to its current location, a project that included lifting the entire building over the Chicago "L" tracks on the Englewood-Jackson Park line. It was a cold December night and the hydraulic equipment responsible for supporting the house froze. For two weeks, the house sat adjacent to the "L" tracks until it could be moved to its current home at 1827 S. Indiana.

== Renaming ==
After an increase in public interest in the history of the preservation of the house, the St. Paul Church of God in Christ began to generate support for renaming it to honor Bishop Louis Henry Ford. This effort was led by Pastor Kevin Anthony Ford, Bishop Ford's grandson and pastor of the church. The Chicago City Council approved the renaming of the House from the Henry B. Clarke House to the Henry B. and Caroline Clarke/Bishop Louis Henry and Margaret Ford House on November 18, 2022 to recognize the role of Carolyn Clarke, Bishop Louis Henry, and Margaret Ford in preserving the house.

== Clarke-Ford House Museum ==
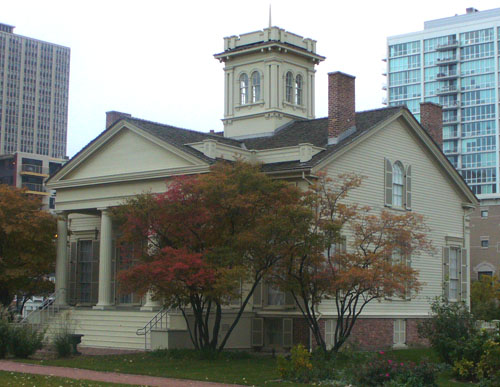
The Clarke-Ford House in October 2008

The Clarke-Ford House Museum is operated as a historic house museum by the Chicago Department of Cultural Affairs and Special Events, in partnership with The National Society of The Colonial Dames of America in the State of Illinois, which provides the period furnishings.
