= NEMA Chicago =

Skyscraper in Chicago, Illinois

Coordinates: 41.8671°N 87.6231°W

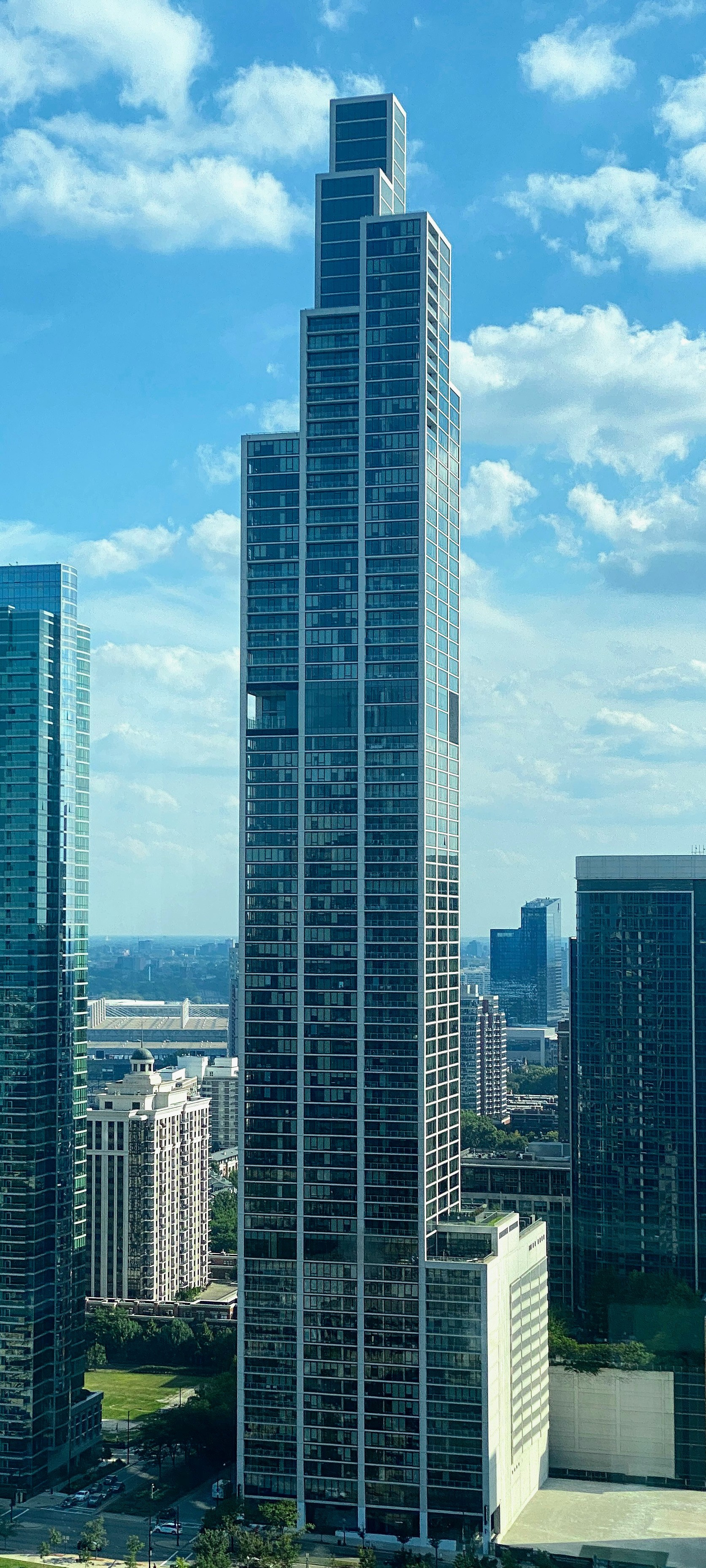
- NEMA (Chicago)
- Interactive map of the NEMA Chicago area

General information
- Status: Completed
- Type: Residential
- Location: 1210 South Indiana Avenue; Chicago, Illinois 60606
- Estimated completion: 2019
- Management: Crescent Heights

Height
- Roof: 896 feet (273.1 m)

Technical details
- Floor count: 76

Design and construction
- Architect: Rafael Viñoly
- Structural engineer: Magnusson Klemencic Associates
- Main contractor: James McHugh Construction Co.

Other information
- Number of units: 800
- Parking: 622

Website
- www.rentnemachicago.com

NEMA Chicago (also 1210 South Indiana; formerly 113 East Roosevelt or One Grant Park) is a 76-story residential skyscraper in Chicago, Illinois in the Central Station neighborhood, of the Near South Side. The tower, built by developer Crescent Heights, has 800 apartments and rises 896 feet (273.1 m) making it the city's tallest rental apartment building. NEMA is the tenth-tallest building in Chicago as of 2024 and the forty first-tallest building in the United States. It is the tallest all-rental residential building in the city.

NEMA Chicago is designed by Rafael Viñoly as the first of a three phase development that includes an even taller 648-unit structure as the second phase and a 100-unit townhouse development with a public park as the third phase. Building interiors are designed by David Rockwell.

== History ==
Despite the 2008 financial crisis, Gerald Fogelson, co-chairman and chief executive of Central Station Development Corp., had sought approval for a 73-story Grant Park Tower III at the 113 East Roosevelt location in 2008. An 83-story Grant Park Tower IV at Michigan and Roosevelt was also planned to begin preconstruction sales in 2009. Miami developer Crescent Heights acquired the real estate for the development in 2012 for $29.5 million. The development was presented in a community meeting on September 22, 2015. The Chicago Plan Commission approved the development on November 19, 2015, in a meeting that also resulted in the approval of the Wanda Vista tower. The building will be located on a 1-acre (4,047 m^{2}) site once used for Illinois Central Railroad tracks in the 1960s. On January 4, 2017, the name of the building was changed to One Grant Park after a 203 million financing loan was announced for the 792-unit, 829-foot, 76-story, luxury residential building.

In 2018, the name was changed again to NEMA, short for "New Market," a lifestyle brand with sister buildings in San Francisco and a project in development in Boston. During the second quarter of 2019, occupants began taking residence. In mid-2019 Crescent Heights refinanced its original construction loans with KKR Real Estate Finance Trust in order to lower its interest rates by about 80 basis points. By that time, 35 percent of the apartments had been leased.

The development sits adjacent to the southwest corner of Grant Park. Originally, the name 113 East Roosevelt was associated with the whole three phase development and reflects the address on Roosevelt Road (at the corner of Indiana Avenue) of Phase I of the development. To its west Phase II of the development will occur and will be a residential building at Roosevelt Road and Michigan Avenue. Phase III of the development is for townhouses and a public park on Indiana Avenue to the east of the two towers. The designs of the towers in the development feature architectural elements, such as “square structural bays of varying stacked heights” that pay homage to Willis Tower. Similar to Willis Tower, the building uses a "bundled tube" configuration, consisting of nine interlocked steel tubes as its framing system, and concrete walls extending to perimeter columns for wind protection. An alternate address for the location is 1210 South Indiana Avenue.

The building is the tallest residential apartment tower in Chicago. It is taller than any building on the South Side of Chicago, surpassing its neighbor One Museum Park.

In January 2021, NEMA (Chicago) won both the Award of Excellence and the Best Tall Building Americas Audience Award of the Council on Tall Buildings and Urban Habitat (CTBUH) in the category Best Tall Building 200–299 meters.

== Design, architecture and amenities ==
Chicago's NEMA Tower consists of three stacked parts: a site-filling base; a square middle section with a southern extension that looks like a giant staircase; and an upper section with several indents. Together, these parts form a sculptural whole reminiscent of Willis, even though the structural systems of the two buildings are quite different.

The designs of the towers in the development feature architectural elements, such as “square structural bays of varying stacked heights” that pay homage to Willis Tower. Similar to Willis Tower, the building uses a "bundled tube" configuration, consisting of nine interlocked steel tubes as its framing system, and concrete walls extending to perimeter columns for wind protection.

The building has 70,000 square feet of amenities, including an outdoor Grant Park and Lake Michigan viewing platform; co-working space; a fitness center and spa with basketball, squash, yoga and a regulation-size boxing ring; golf simulator; indoor / outdoor swimming pool; game room; kids room; and a private dining ballroom.

The interior of the South Loop Tower, including 70,000 square feet of communal space, was designed by David Rockwell, an American architect and designer from New York City. The building is LEED Silver certified.

NEMA Chicago's architectural style has been described by Chicago Curbed magazine as "Millennium Modern."

== See also ==
- List of tallest buildings in Chicago
- List of tallest buildings in the United States
