= Gerald Fogelson =

American businessperson

Gerald Warren Fogelson (born 1933) is a real estate developer and author. Fogelson led the re-development of the Central Station residential neighborhood of Chicago, Illinois, which had formerly housed a train station. His book, Central Station: Realizing a Vision, chronicles the history of that project. Fogelson also co-founded the Marshall Bennett Institute of Real Estate at Roosevelt University.

== Early life and education ==
Fogelson was born in Dover, New Jersey, in 1933. He graduated with honors from the Morristown School (now the Morristown-Beard School) in Morristown, New Jersey, in 1951. In 1955, Fogelson completed a bachelor's degree in business administration at Lehigh University in Bethlehem, New Jersey, and graduated cum laude. During his studies at the school, he served as president of the university chapter of Pi Lambda Phi. Fogelson also served as public relations director of Lehigh's 1955 music festival.

== Real estate career ==
During his senior year at Lehigh University, Fogelson founded Thor-Built Homes to construct single-family homes near Netcong and Dover, New Jersey. He later founded Fogelson Development to construct free-standing homes and subdivisions. Since then, he has developed properties in eight states (California, Florida, Illinois, Indiana, Kentucky, Minnesota, New Jersey, Ohio).

== Recognition and legacy ==
In 2003, the Chicago City Council passed a resolution honoring Fogelson after his induction into the Chicago Association of Realtors' Hall of Fame. Five years later, Congressman Rahm Emanuel recognized his contributions to urban planning during remarks on the floor of the U.S. House of Representatives. The Illinois House of Representatives passed resolutions honoring him in that year and 2004.
