= William Wallace Kimball =

American businessman

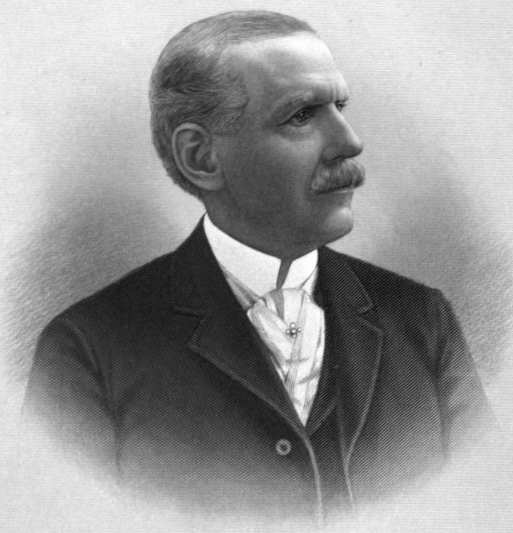
- Born: March 22, 1828; Rumford, Maine
- Died: December 16, 1904 (aged 76); Chicago, Illinois
- Occupation: Businessman
- Spouse: Evalyne M. Cove (m. 1865)

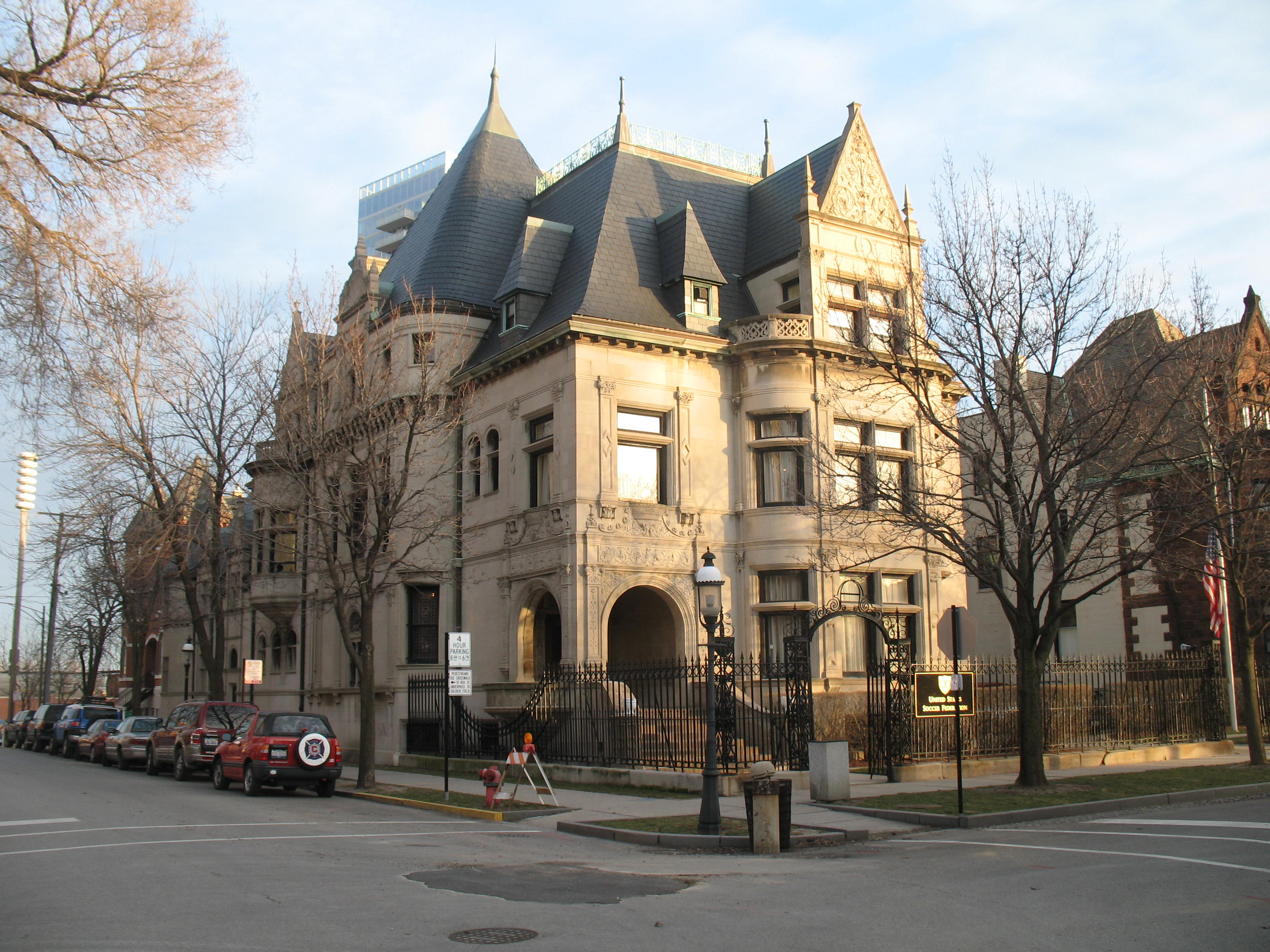
Kimball's house at 1801 S. Prairie Avenue was the long time headquarters for the United States Soccer Federation.

William Wallace Kimball (1828–1904) was a Chicago businessman and industrialist who founded the W. W. Kimball Company, a piano manufacture that would later become Kimball International.

== Biography ==
Kimball was born in Rumford, Maine on March 22, 1828. He moved to Decorah, Iowa, in his mid-twenties and became a real estate broker. He liquidated his investments just before the Panic of 1857 and moved to Chicago.

In 1857 he also founded the Kimball Piano Company, beginning with only four pianos. He sold these at a profit and progressed from there, selling pianos manufactured in the east and shipped to his store. Before the Great Chicago Fire, he had a store in the Crosby Opera House. His place of business was destroyed in the fire, and he lost over $100,000.

He later moved to State and Adams Streets. He married Evalyne M. Cove in 1865. In 1877, Kimball decided to manufacture his own pianos to keep down the cost of the final product. In 1881, he opened his own factory and began churning out around 100 pianos and organs every week. Kimball Avenue (3400W) is named after him.

Kimball died at his home in Chicago on December 16, 1904. He is buried at Graceland Cemetery in Chicago.
