= One Museum Park =

Condominium building in Chicago, Illinois

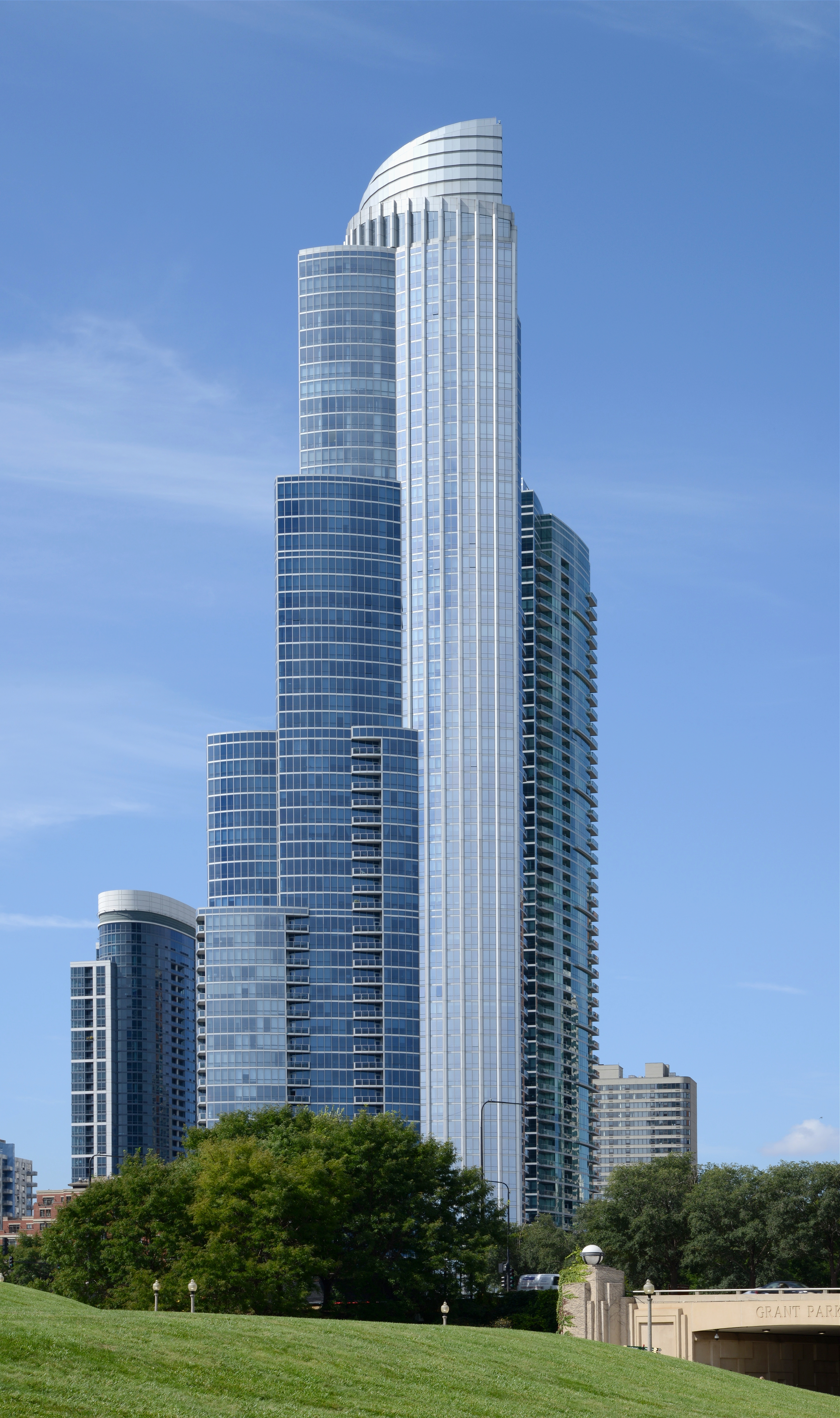
- View from Grant Park
- Interactive map of the One Museum Park area

General information
- Status: Completed
- Type: Residential
- Location: 1211 South Prairie Avenue; Chicago, Illinois
- Coordinates: 41.867100°N 87.621600°W
- Construction started: 2007
- Completed: 2009
- Opening: 2009

Height
- Roof: 726 ft (221 m)

Technical details
- Floor count: 62

Design and construction
- Architects: Pappageorge/Haymes, Ltd.
- Structural engineer: Samartano & Company

One Museum Park is a skyscraper in South Loop, Chicago, designed by Chicago-based architecture firm Pappageorge Haymes, Ltd.

== Overview ==
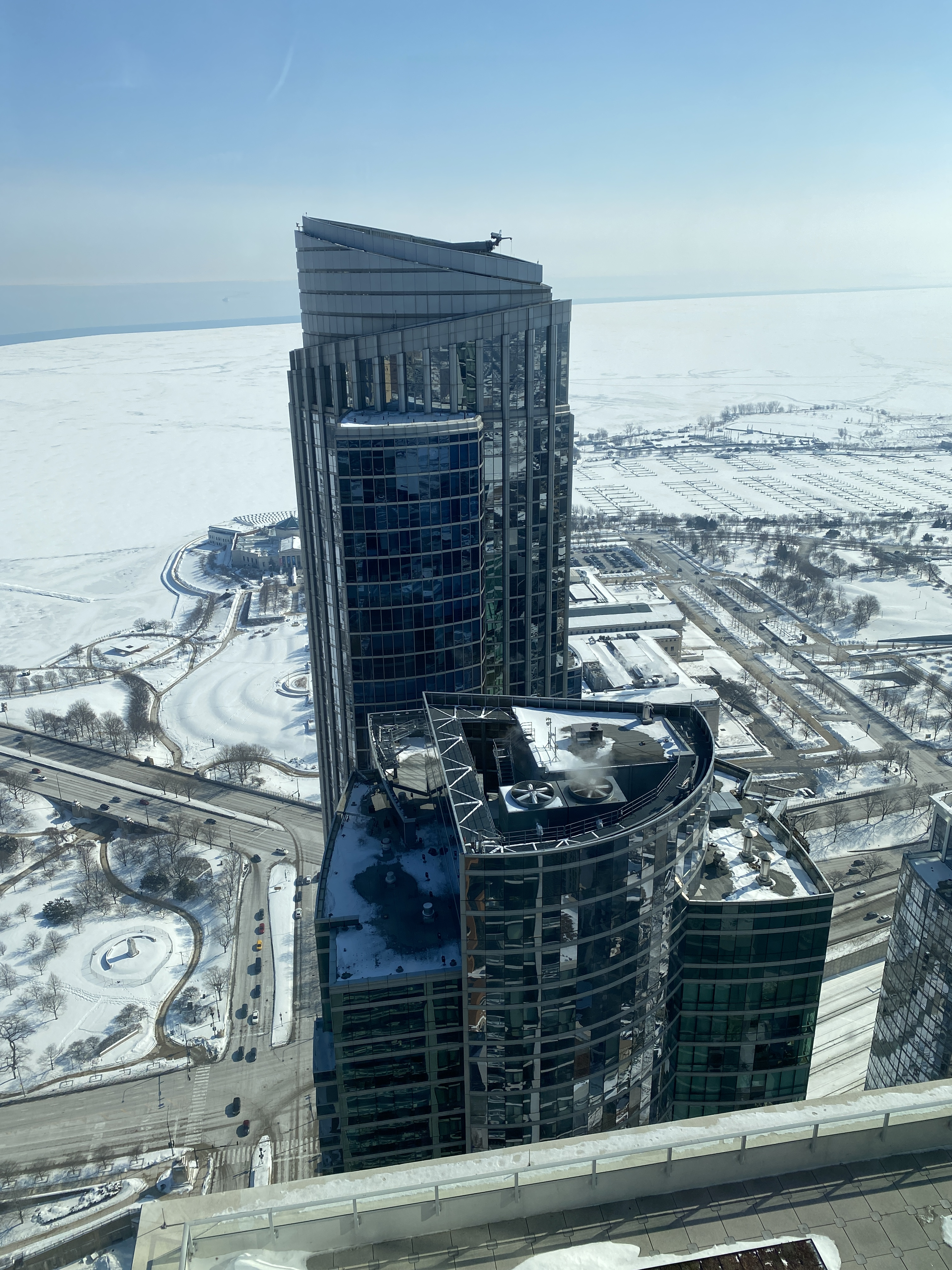
View of the top of the building from NEMA in 2021

One Museum Park is the second-tallest building in the Central Station development, on the south side of Chicago and south of Van Buren Street (NEMA Chicago is the current tallest). It is also the third tallest all-residential building in Chicago after the Legacy at Millennium Park and NEMA Chicago.

Museum Park is a complex of multiple residential towers within the Central Station development at the southern edge of Grant Park, across Lake Shore Drive from Chicago's Museum Campus. Construction of One Museum Park was followed by the 54-story The Grant (formerly One Museum Park West), directly to the west at the corner of Roosevelt Road and Indiana Avenue.

== Education ==
The building is zoned to schools in the Chicago Public Schools.

- South Loop Elementary School
- Phillips Academy High School

== See also ==
- List of buildings
- List of skyscrapers
- List of tallest buildings in Chicago
- List of tallest buildings in the United States
- World's tallest structures
