= Prairie Avenue District =

Historic district in Illinois, United States

- U.S. National Register of Historic Places
- U.S. Historic district
- Chicago Landmark
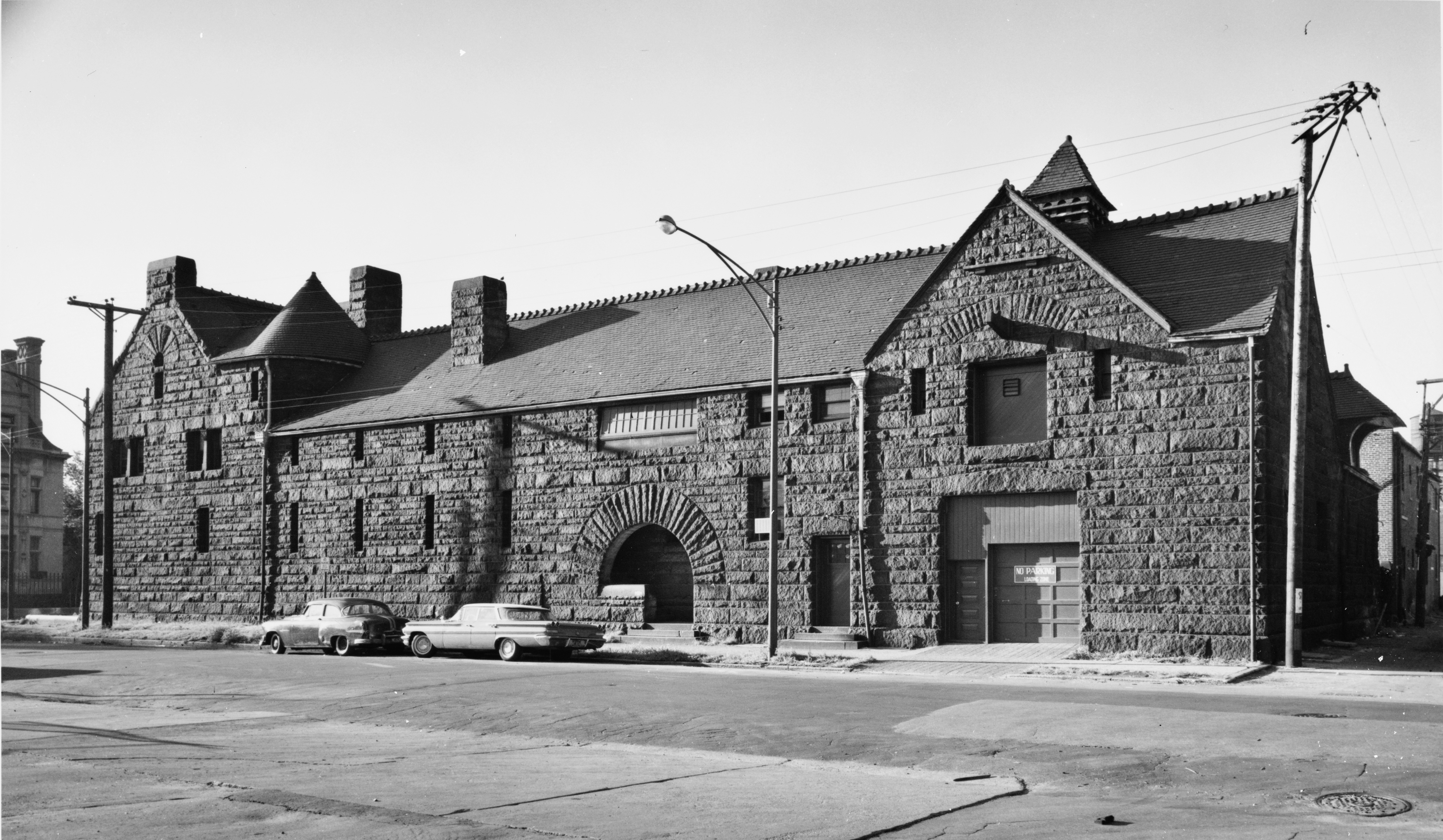
- The John J. Glessner House by Henry Hobson Richardson is located within the Prairie Avenue District.

- Location within Chicago metropolitan area Location within Illinois
- Location: Chicago, Illinois
- Coordinates: 41°51′26″N 87°37′19″W
- Built: 1836–1892
- Architect: Henry Hobson Richardson
- Architectural style: Renaissance, Romanesque
- NRHP reference No.: 72000452

Significant dates
- Designated HD: November 15, 1972
- Designated CHICL: December 27, 1979

The Prairie Avenue District is a historic district in the Near South Side community area of Chicago, Illinois. It includes the 1800 and 1900 blocks of South Prairie Avenue and the 1800 block of South Indiana, and 211-217 East Cullerton. It was the site of the Battle of Fort Dearborn and became the city's most fashionable residential district after the Great Chicago Fire. It was designated a Chicago Landmark on December 27, 1979. The district was added to the National Register of Historic Places on November 15, 1972. The John J. Glessner House, designed and built by Henry Hobson Richardson in 1885–1886 at 1800 S. Prairie Avenue, has been restored as a historic house museum, and is open for public tours. In 2006, the Prairie District Neighborhood Alliance, a non-profit organization was formed to provide representation for thousands of South Loop residents, including the Prairie Avenue District, Central Station, Museum Park, Motor Row, and the South Michigan Avenue Corridor, as well as other areas of the Near South Side.

== Prairie District Neighborhood Alliance ==
The Prairie District Neighborhood Alliance (PDNA) is a non-profit resident organization in Chicago. The PDNA provides support and benefits to residents, condominium and town home associations, businesses, cultural institutions, and organizations who reside within the area and who agree to and support the purpose of the alliance.

=== Activities ===
On September 6, 2008, the organization hosted the 'Festival on Prairie Avenue,' with Mayor Richard M. Daley in attendance. The festival took visitors back to the time of the 1893 World’s Columbian Exposition in recognition of the street's restoration to its 1890s appearance; and was attended by over 1,200 residents.

=== Achievements ===
The PDNA and its residents banded together to successfully save the Vietnam Veterans Art Museum building at 1801 S. Indiana Avenue, a cultural pillar of the neighborhood, from being sold privately and converted into a night club. Instead, the building was purchased by the city of Chicago and conveyed to the Chicago Park District to become a new community center. The PDNA presented recommendations to the Commission on Chicago Parks and the alderman to name an important new park which is located near 18th and Calumet Avenue, the site which marks the 1812 Fort Dearborn Massacre.

On August 15, 2009 (the anniversary of the battle), the PDNA joined with the community to commemorate and officially name the site the Battle of Fort Dearborn Park; and unveiled an historic marker outlining the site's significance. The PDNA aims to bring much needed infrastructure and retail to the area.

== Landmarks ==
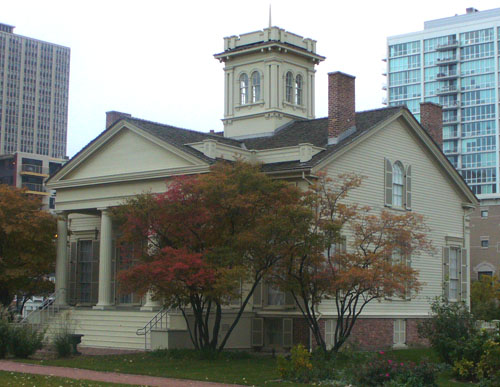
The Henry B. Clarke House, architect unknown, is located at 1827 S. Indiana Avenue, Chicago, Illinois

Built in 1836 and untouched by the great Chicago fire of 1871, the Clarke House is Chicago’s oldest house and is a classic example of the Greek Revival style. Moved twice, and opened as a house museum in 1982, it features 19th century furnishings depicting life on the urban frontier. The John J. Glessner House was designed in 1885 by architect Henry Hobson Richardson and completed in late 1887. Both properties were designated Chicago landmarks on October 14, 1970. The Clarke and Glessner houses are key PDNA partners.

With such rapid growth in the South Loop, residents who live within the Prairie District Neighborhood Alliance boundaries have become increasingly concerned about the quality of new development and the quality of work performed on properties being converted to residential use. Condo boards and residents have begun to band together to make their voices heard. A few have achieved high-profile status. Additionally, the PDNA and area residents work with the city government to actively review proposed development projects in an effort to encourage smart growth. This is to protect the architectural character of the historic Prairie Avenue district.
