= List of auto dealership and repair shop buildings =

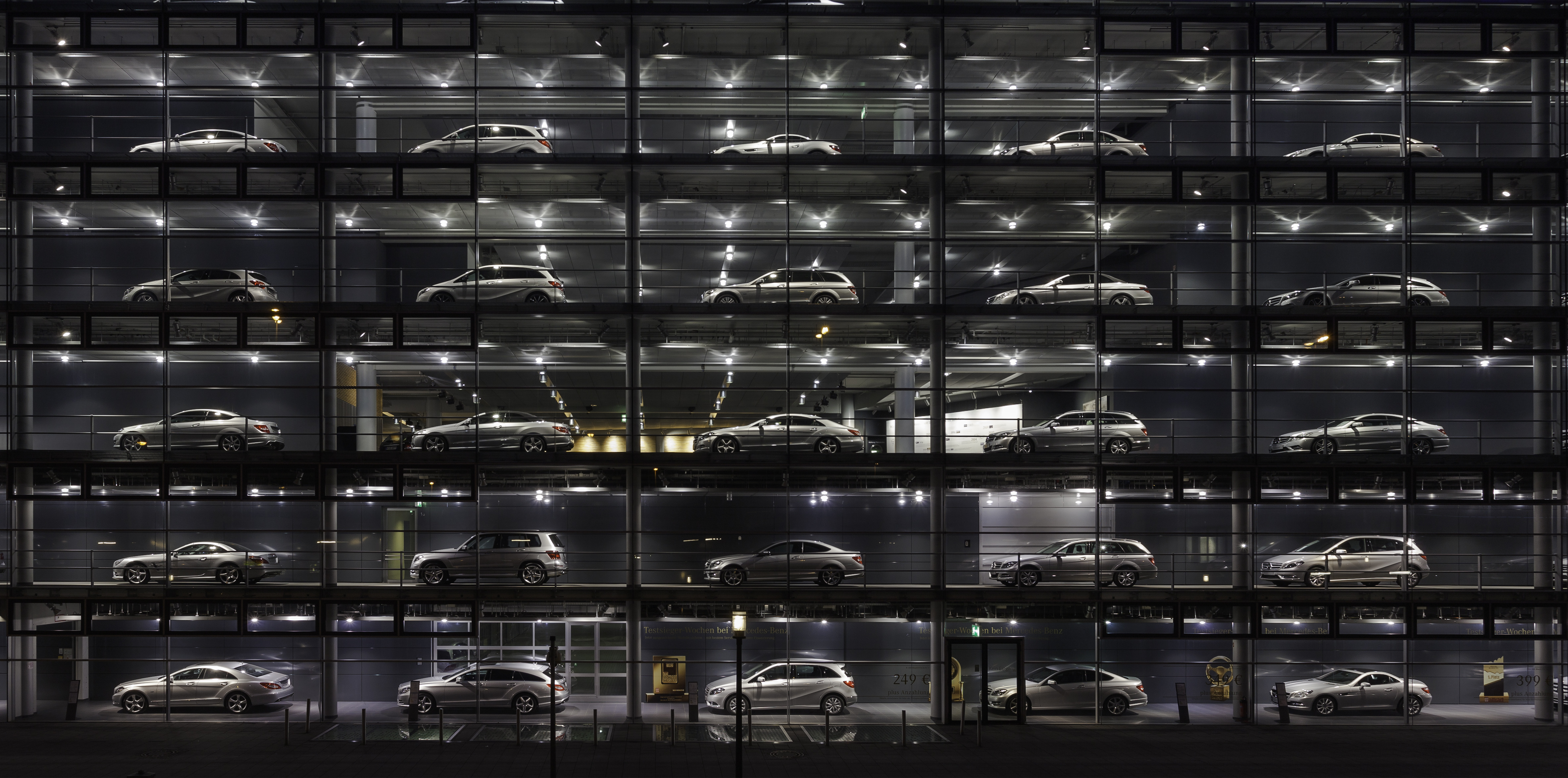
Mercedes-Benz showroom in Munich, Germany

A number of auto dealership, auto service, and auto repair shop buildings are notable. A number of these are listed on historic registers, including some in the United States whose notability is documented by their listing the National Register of Historic Places (NRHP). Many auto dealership showroom buildings also include auto servicing areas. This list is intended to include all notable showroom buildings, with or without associated auto service or auto repair facilities, and to include independent auto service or repair facilities.

Buildings which are primarily filling stations and only secondarily include an auto service bay are covered in List of historic filling stations, instead. as These include places known as "service stations" in the U.S.

== Malta ==
| Building | Image | Dates | Location | City | Description |
|---|---|---|---|---|---|
| Muscats Motors | | 1945 built 2012 scheduled | Rue D'Argens; 35°54′05.3″N 14°29′28.5″E | Gżira | Streamline Moderne style |

== Turkey ==
One of the biggest collections of showrooms of any kind is a 216,000-square-metre (2,330,000 sq ft) car showroom complex in Istanbul called Autopia Europia.

== United Arab Emirates ==
One of the world's largest showrooms of any kind is the 35,000 square metres (380,000 sq ft) BMW showroom in Abu Dhabi. Another notable showroom in UAE is designed by Uruguayan architect Carlos Ott. Lamborghini unveiled its largest showroom in the world, a 30,000 sq. ft facility in Dubai.

== United States ==
| Building | Image | Dates | Location | City, State | Description |
|---|---|---|---|---|---|
| 1901 McGee Street Automotive Service Building | | 1912 built 2009 NRHP-listed | 1901-1907 McGee St. 39°05′25″N 94°34′48″W | Kansas City, Missouri | Early Commercial style |
| ABC Auto Sales and Investment Company Building | | 1927 built 2012 NRHP-listed | 3509-27 Page Blvd. 38°38′45″N 90°13′35″W | St. Louis, Missouri | |
| Al's Motors | | 1948 built 2003 NRHP-listed | 3910 Wilson Blvd. 38°52′45″N 77°6′27″W | Arlington, Virginia | |
| America's Packard Museum | | 1917 built | 39°45′13″N 84°11′30″W | Dayton, Ohio | Originally a Packard dealership, now an automotive museum. |
| Atlantic Motor Company | | 1919 built 2005 NRHP-listed | 1840 W. Broad St.37°33′31″N 77°27′36″W | Richmond, Virginia | Classical Revival-style auto showroom building designed by Albert F. Huntt and Bascom J. Rowlett. |
| Auto Rest Garage | | 1917 built 1996 NRHP-listed | 925–935 SW 10th Avenue; 45.518284°N 122.683329°W | Portland, Oregon | Early Commercial-style building, designed by Jacobberger & Smith to serve as a showroom for Stutz and Columbia automobiles. |
| Berwyn Route 66 Museum | | | 7003 W. Ogden Avenue; 41.82545°N 87.7976°W | Berwyn, Illinois | In a former Anderson Ford dealership building, repurposed in 2012. |
| Blacksburg Motor Company, Inc. | | 1924 built 2008 NRHP-listed | 400 S. Main St. 37°13′43″N 80°24′42″W | Blacksburg, Virginia | |
| Blankinship Motor Company Building | | 1940 built 2001 NRHP-listed | 120 E. Cypress St. 33°36′51″N 92°3′52″W | Warren, Arkansas | Moderne |
| Bohn Motor Company Automobile Dealership | | 1925 built 2011 NRHP-listed | 2700 S. Broad; 29°57′03″N 90°05′59″W | New Orleans, Louisiana | Italianate building designed by architect Emile Weil |
| Buick Automobile Company Building | | 1907 built 2004 NRHP-listed | 216 Admiral Blvd. | Kansas City, Missouri | |
| Cadillac Automobile Company Building | | 1919 built 2005 NRHP-listed | 3224 Locust St. | St. Louis, Missouri | |
| Casa de cadillac | | 1949 | 14401 Ventura Boulevard; 34.15077°N 118.44603°W | Sherman Oaks, California | Googie architecture building used by Cadillac-Buick-GMC dealership firm since 1949 |
| Cass Motor Sales | | 1928 built 1986 NRHP-listed | 5800 Cass Avenue; 42°21′43″N 83°4′12″W | Detroit, Michigan | Designed by Charles N. Agree in Art Deco style |
| Claremore Auto Dealership | | 1930 built 1995 NRHP-listed | 625 W. Will Rogers Blvd. 36°18′46″N 95°37′02″W | Claremore, Oklahoma | On U.S. Route 66. Auto dealership, built in Art Deco style, appears to have been demolished. |
| Clemens Automobile Company Building | | 1916 built 2009 NRHP-listed | 200 10th St. 41°35′03″N 93°37′46″W | Des Moines, Iowa | |
| Colman Automotive Building | | 1915-16 built 2013 NRHP-listed | 401 E. Pine St. 47°36′54″N 122°19′35″W | Seattle, Washington | Car dealership for Stanley Steamer and other brands. Designed by Seattle architects Webster & Ford. |
| H Street Playhouse | | 1928 built 2004 NRHP-listed | 1365 H Street, N.E.38°54′7.43″N 76°59′11.23″W | Washington, D.C. | Romanesque Revival-styled. Served as auto sales dealership building, is now a theatre. |
| Howard Motor Company Building | | 1927 built 1996 NRHP-listed | 1285 E. Colorado Blvd. 34°08′47″N 118°07′26″W | Pasadena, California | |
| Hupmobile Building | | 1917 built 2014 NRHP-listed | 2523 Farnam Street; 41.257437°N 95.949325°W | Omaha, Nebraska | Auto dealership and service center. |
| Jennings Ford Automobile Dealership | | 1919 built 2006 NRHP-listed | 431 S. Fourth St. 39°47′51″N 89°39′4″W | Springfield, Illinois | |
| Jones Motor Company | | 1939 built 1993 NRHP-listed | 3222 Central Avenue SE; 35°4′37.72″N 106°37′8.88″W | Albuquerque, New Mexico | |
| Kindel Building | | 1928 built 1996 NRHP-listed | 1095 E. Colorado Blvd. 34°8′47″N 118°7′40″W | Pasadena, California | Italian Renaissance Revival-style. |
| Maxwell-Briscoe Automobile Company Showroom | | 1909 built 2002 NRHP-listed | 1737 S. Michigan Ave. 41°51′36″N 87°37′25″W | Chicago, Illinois | Part of Chicago's Motor Row |
| Packard Motor Car Showroom and Storage Facility | | 1927 built 2006 NRHP-listed | 1325 Main St. 42°54′35″N 78°51′59″W | Buffalo, New York | Designed by Albert Kahn in Classical Revival style |
| Packard Motor Corporation Building | | 1911 built 1980 NRHP-listed | 317–321 N. Broad St. 39°57′31″N 75°9′45″W | Philadelphia, Pennsylvania | Chicago-style skyscraper designed by Albert Kahn |
| Pence Automobile Company Building | | 1909 built 2007 NRHP-listed | 800 Hennepin Ave. 44°58′38″N 93°16′33″W | Minneapolis, Minnesota | Classical Revival |
| Stuber–Stone Building | | 1916 built 1996 NRHP-listed | 4221–4229 Cass Avenue; 42°21′2.68″N 83°3′50.82″W | Detroit, Michigan | |
| Studebaker Building | | 1925 built 1985 NRHP-listed | 27°45′49″N 82°38′18″W | St. Petersburg, Florida | |
| Washington Talking Book & Braille Library | | | 2021 Ninth Avenue (at corner of Lenora Street) | Seattle, Washington | Streamline Moderne-style, designed by Naramore, Bain, Brady, and Johanson. Formerly a Dodge dealership, renovated in 1997 to become a library. |
| Willys-Overland Building | | 1917 built 1999 NRHP-listed | 2300 Locust St. 38°38′8″N 90°12′44″W | St. Louis, Missouri | Commercial Classical Revival |
| Young Brothers Chevrolet Garage | | 1912 built 1994 NRHP-listed | 201 Pennsylvania St. 48°35′38″N 109°13′54″W | Chinook, Montana | Mission/Spanish Revival in style. |
| Ypsilanti Automotive Heritage Museum | | | 100 East Cross Street; 42.24579°N 83.60808°W | Ypsilanti, Michigan | Former Dodge dealership building. |

Numerous more auto showroom buildings are listed on the National Register as contributing buildings in historic districts, including some within Chicago's Motor Row District.

Under construction/To be added:

- more items from "wt:NRHP#Gas station drive"
- perhaps a few from List of historic filling stations

== See also ==
- List of historic filling stations, including some with service bays / garages / repair shops, and many known as "service stations".
