= Showroom =

Large space used to display products or show entertainment

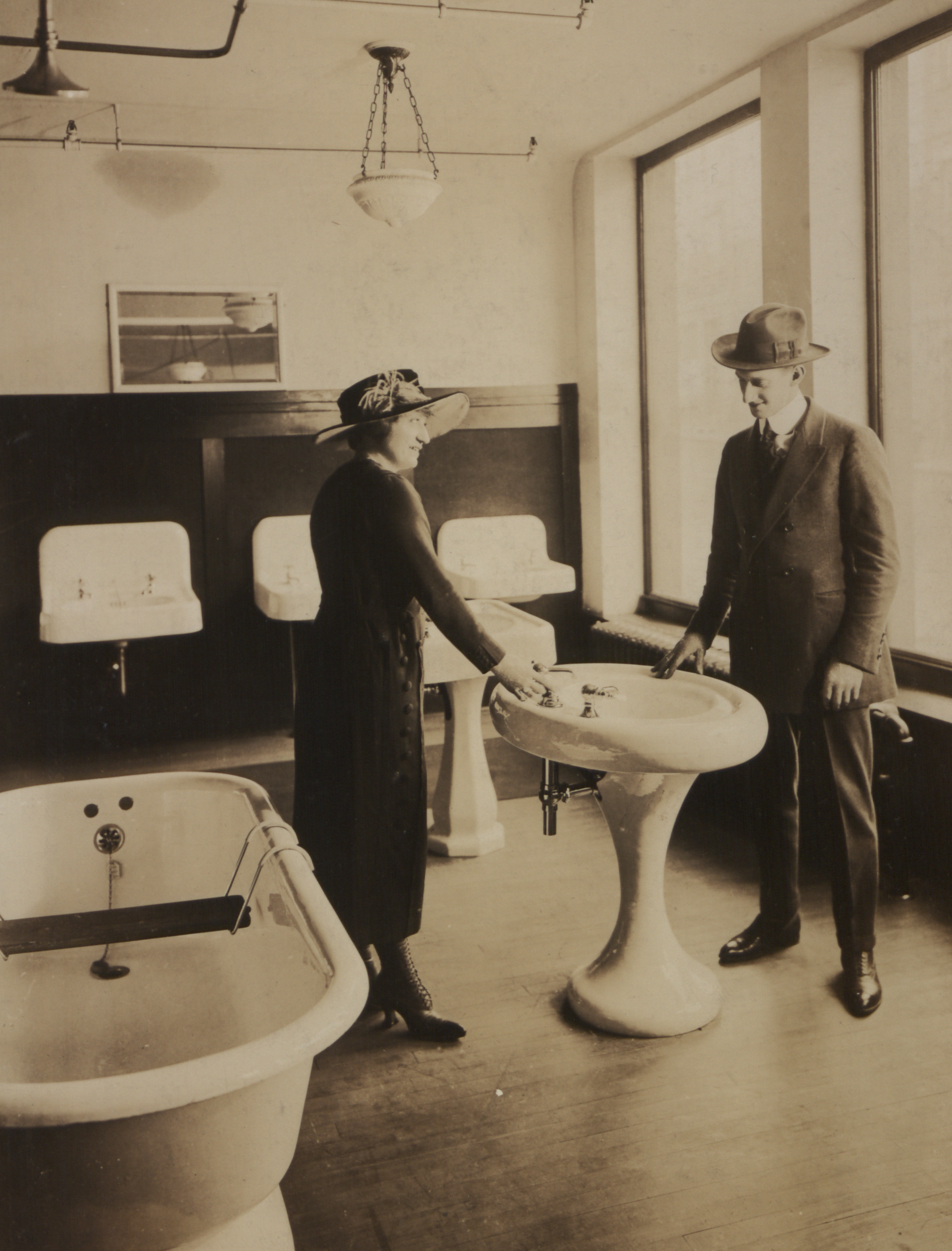
A plumbing fixture showroom, Canada, 1921

A showroom is a large space used to display products or show entertainment.

== Marketing location ==
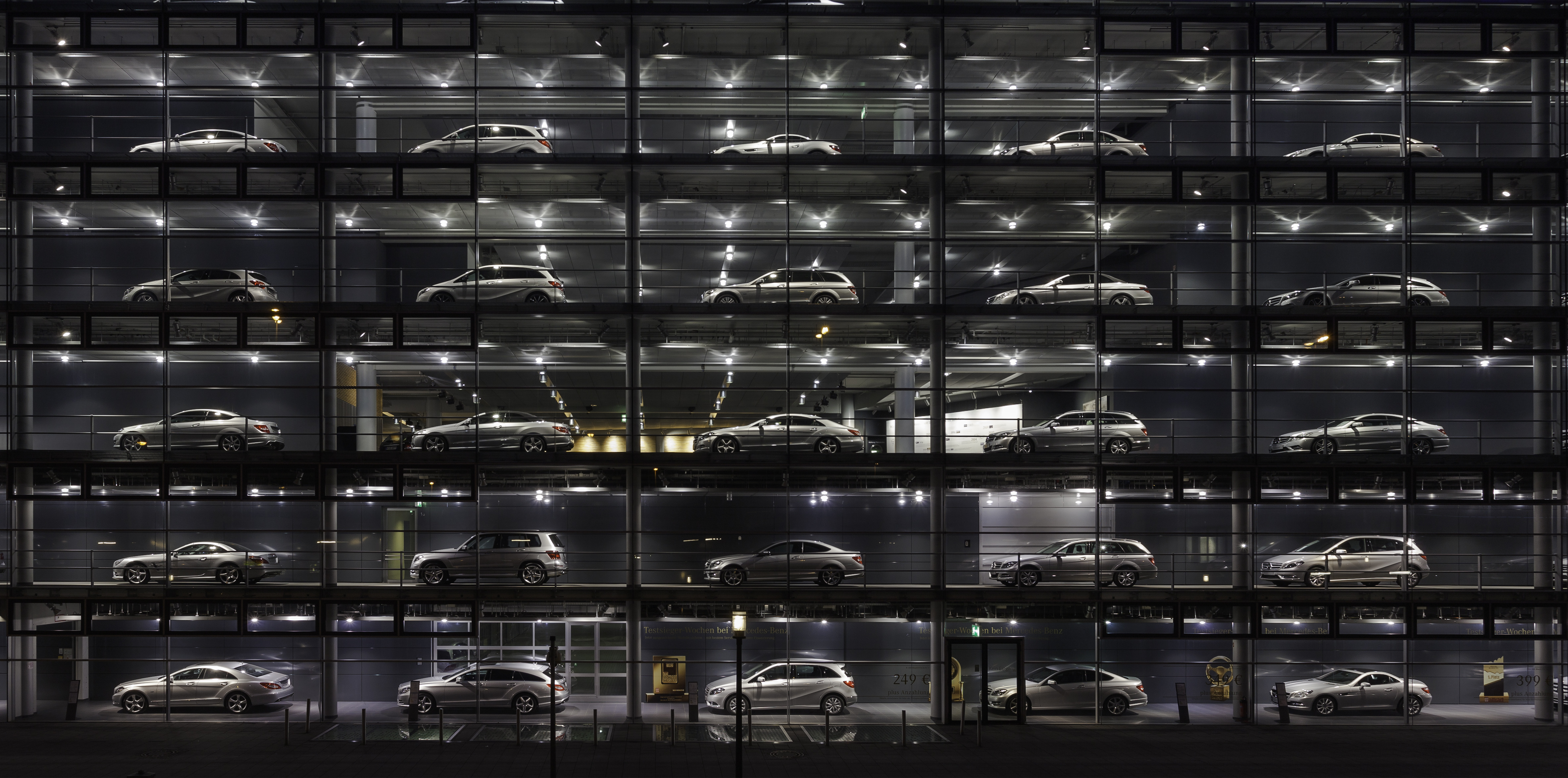
Car dealership showroom

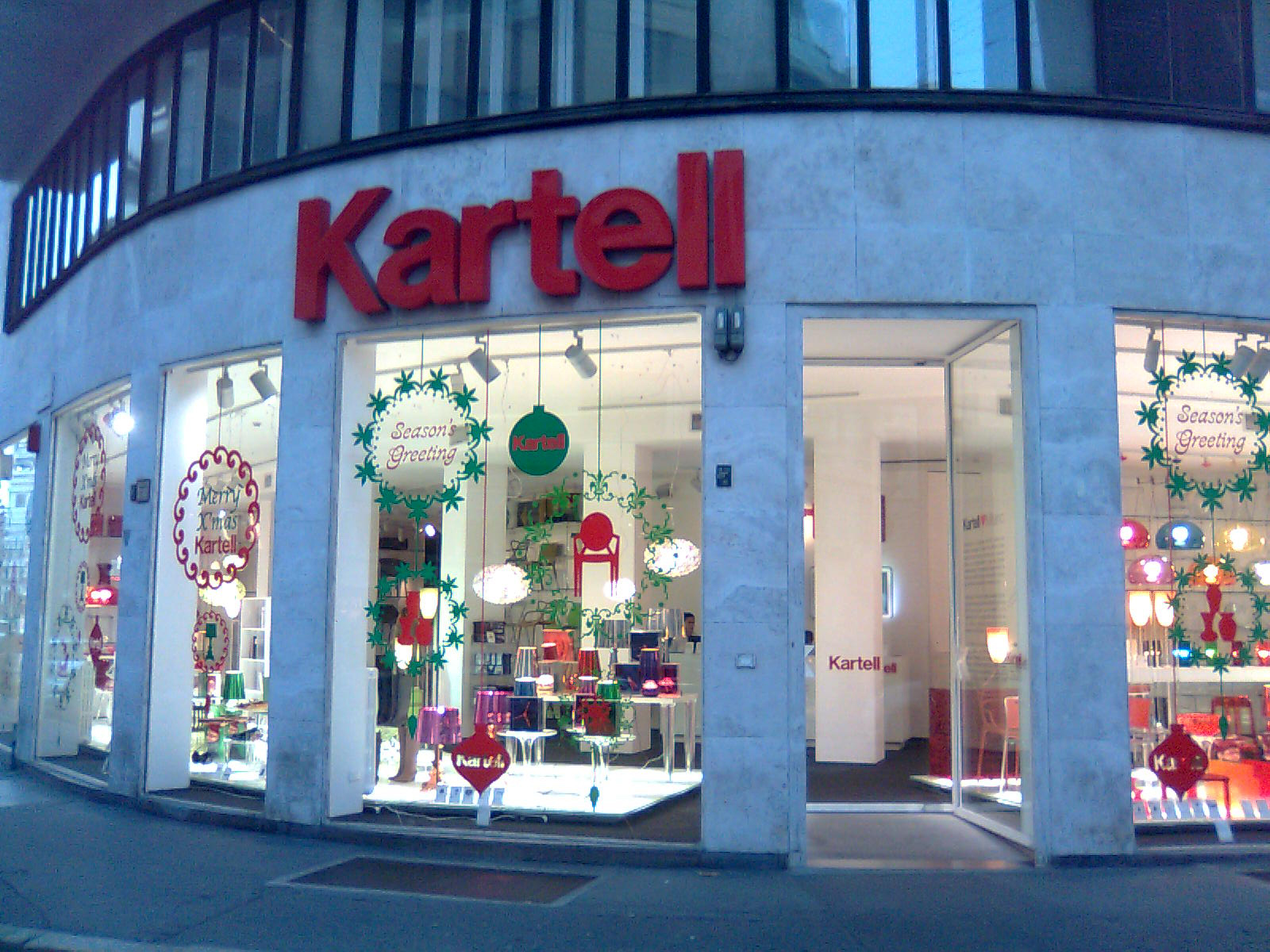
Kartell showroom in Via Turati, Milan, Italy

A showroom is a large space used to display products for sale, such as automobiles, furniture, appliances, carpet or apparel. It is a retail store of a company in which products are on sale in a space created by their brand or company. A showroom can also be a space for wholesale buyers to view fashion merchandise for sale in their retail stores.

Among the various forms of showroom, one has been increasing significantly. The guide shop model is a strategy that many brands found to be present in both online and physical stores. A guide shop is a kind of showroom where the client can try and feel the products and purchase them to have it delivered on his/her home. Fashion stores are adopting the showrooms such guide shops for immersive brand experience and the vantage of no inventory in the stores. Also, their clients feel more confident before buying the product, decreasing the return rates.

The world's most famous locations for a showroom, generally in the form of a cluster, are the Champs Elysees in Paris and Merchandise Mart in Chicago.

One of the world's largest showrooms is the 35,000 square metres (380,000 sq ft) BMW showroom in Abu Dhabi. The biggest collection of showrooms is a 216,000-square-metre (2,330,000 sq ft) car showroom in Istanbul called Autopia Europia.

== Entertainment venue ==
A showroom is a permanent enclosed space used to present a performance. Sometimes it is customized for a particular show; for example, the Las Vegas Hilton showroom used for the rock opera Starlight Express was customized by pouring concrete ramps onto its stage area and in the seating area.

Some showrooms are used daily, while others are only used when a performer is booked to perform. In some cases, a showroom is leased to a performer, who then retains all income rather than being paid by the showroom owner.

== Temporary showroom ==
In fashion capitals such as New York City, Paris, Milan or London one can find temporary showrooms. These places can be rented on a daily or weekly basis. Some temporary showrooms are managed with the help of event management agencies. Most are run and operated by in-house or contracted sale reps in that territory. Temporary showrooms can also be pop-up stores, which are short-term sales spaces.

== See also ==
- Showrooming
- List of auto dealership and repair shop buildings
