= Maxwell-Briscoe Automobile Company Showroom =

- U.S. National Register of Historic Places
- U.S. Historic district – Contributing property
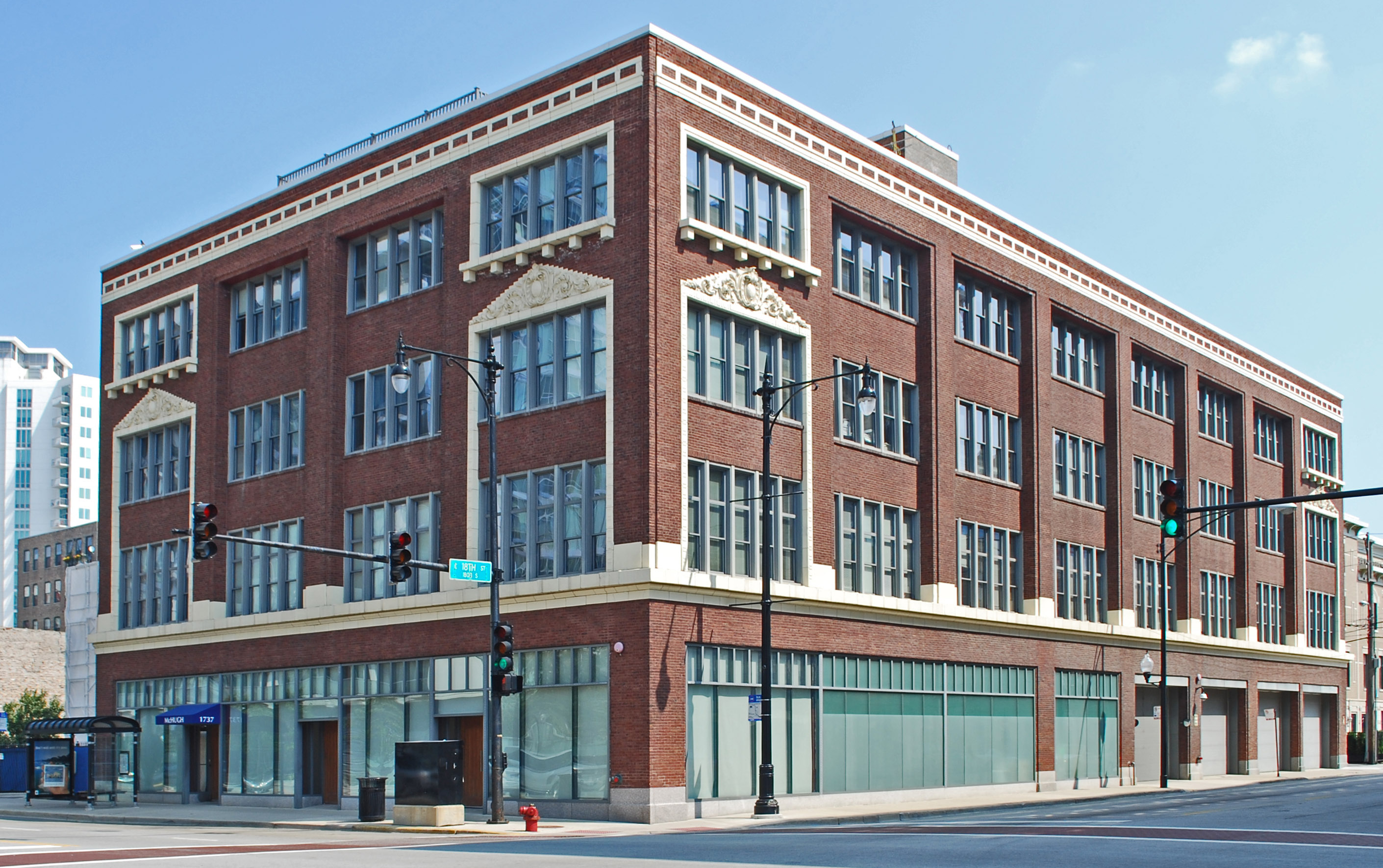

- Location within Chicago metropolitan area Location within Illinois Location within the United States
- Location: 1737 S. Michigan Ave., Chicago, Illinois
- Coordinates: 41°51′36″N 87°37′25″W
- Area: less than one acre
- Built: 1909
- Architect: William Ernest Walker
- Part of: Motor Row Historic District (ID02001387)
- MPS: Motor Row, Chicago, Illinois MPS
- NRHP reference No.: 02001349
- Added to NRHP: November 18, 2002

The Maxwell-Briscoe Automobile Company Showroom is a historic automobile showroom located at 1737 S. Michigan Avenue in Chicago's Motor Row District. The showroom was built in 1909 for the Maxwell-Briscoe Motor Company, which was founded in 1904 by Jonathan D. Maxwell and Benjamin Briscoe. William Ernest Walker, a Chicago architect who specialized in large-scale commercial buildings, designed the showroom. The four-story building is divided by brick piers; the ground floor features large plate-glass windows designed to showcase the company's automobiles, while the upper floors feature banks of double-hung and triple-hung windows between the piers. The building uses terra cotta extensively for decoration; a terra cotta stringcourse encircles the building above the first floor, terra cotta pediments and sills frame the window banks, and a terra cotta frieze runs below the roof line. Maxwell and Briscoe used the building as a showroom until 1915; it is one of the oldest surviving auto showrooms on Motor Row.

The showroom was added to the National Register of Historic Places on November 18, 2002.
