= Kindel Building =

- U.S. National Register of Historic Places
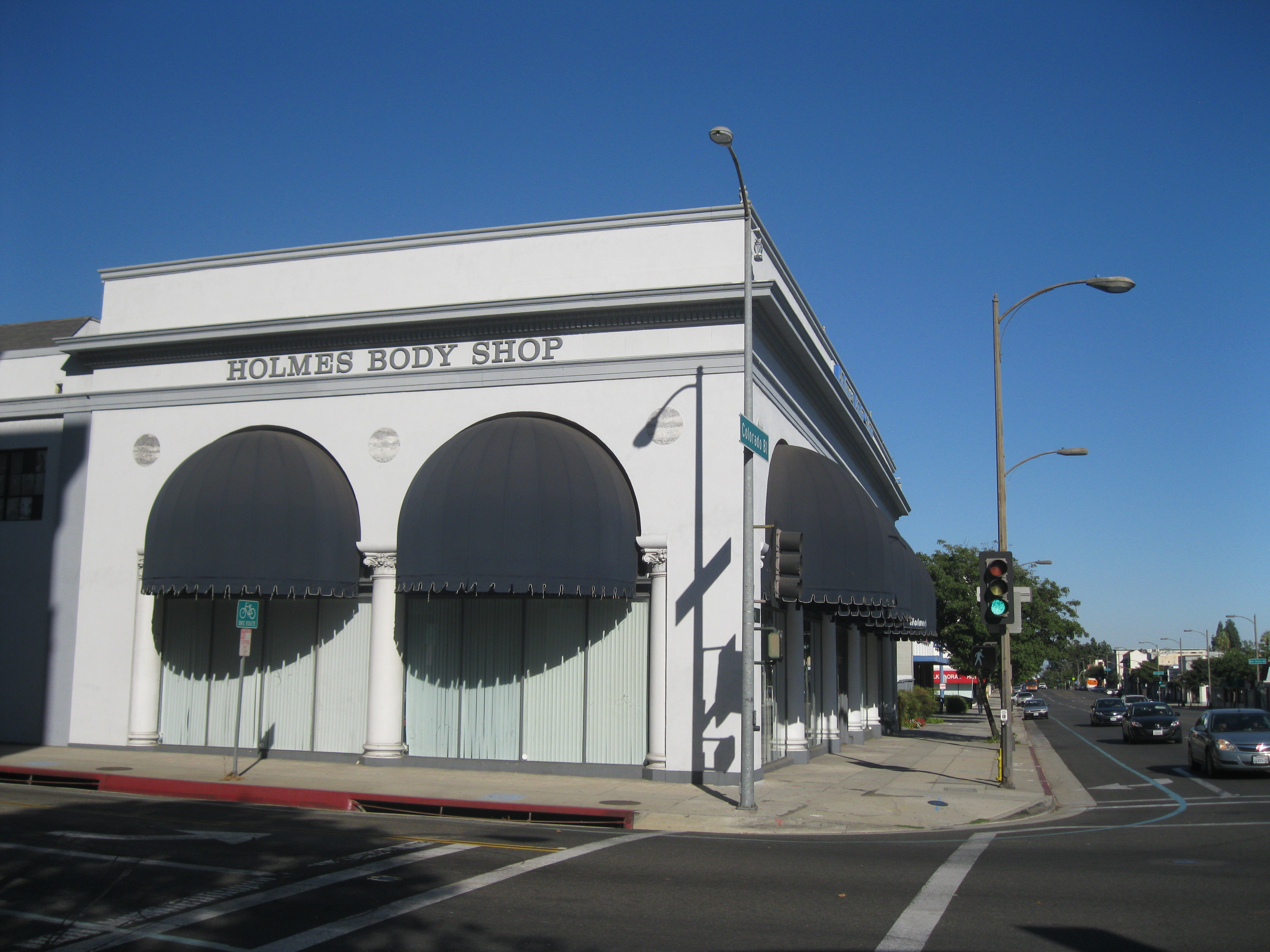

- Location within the Los Angeles metropolitan area Location within California Location within the United States
- Location: 1095 E. Colorado Blvd., Pasadena, California
- Coordinates: 34°8′47″N 118°7′40″W
- Area: less than one acre
- Built: 1927-28
- Architect: Bennett and Haskell
- Architectural style: Italian Renaissance Revival
- MPS: Early Automobile-Related Properties in Pasadena MPS
- NRHP reference No.: 96000423
- Added to NRHP: April 18, 1996

The Kindel Building is a historic automobile showroom at 1095 East Colorado Boulevard in Pasadena, California.

== Description and history ==
It was built in 1927-28 as James H. Kindel's auto dealership. Pasadena architects Bennett and Haskell designed it in the Italian Renaissance Revival style.

The main facade of the building features five arches supported by Corinthian columns and extensive plate glass windows displaying the showroom's interior, and the entrance includes cast iron piers and a transom with an iron grille. The McDaneld Motor Company, the Bush-Morgan Motor Company, and the Howard Motor Company all used the building as a dealership, and it was later used as a body shop.

The building was added to the National Register of Historic Places on April 18, 1996.

== See also ==
- Howard Motor Company Building, another historic Pasadena auto showroom
