= E2 nightclub stampede =

Tragedy incident at nightclub in Chicago, Illinois

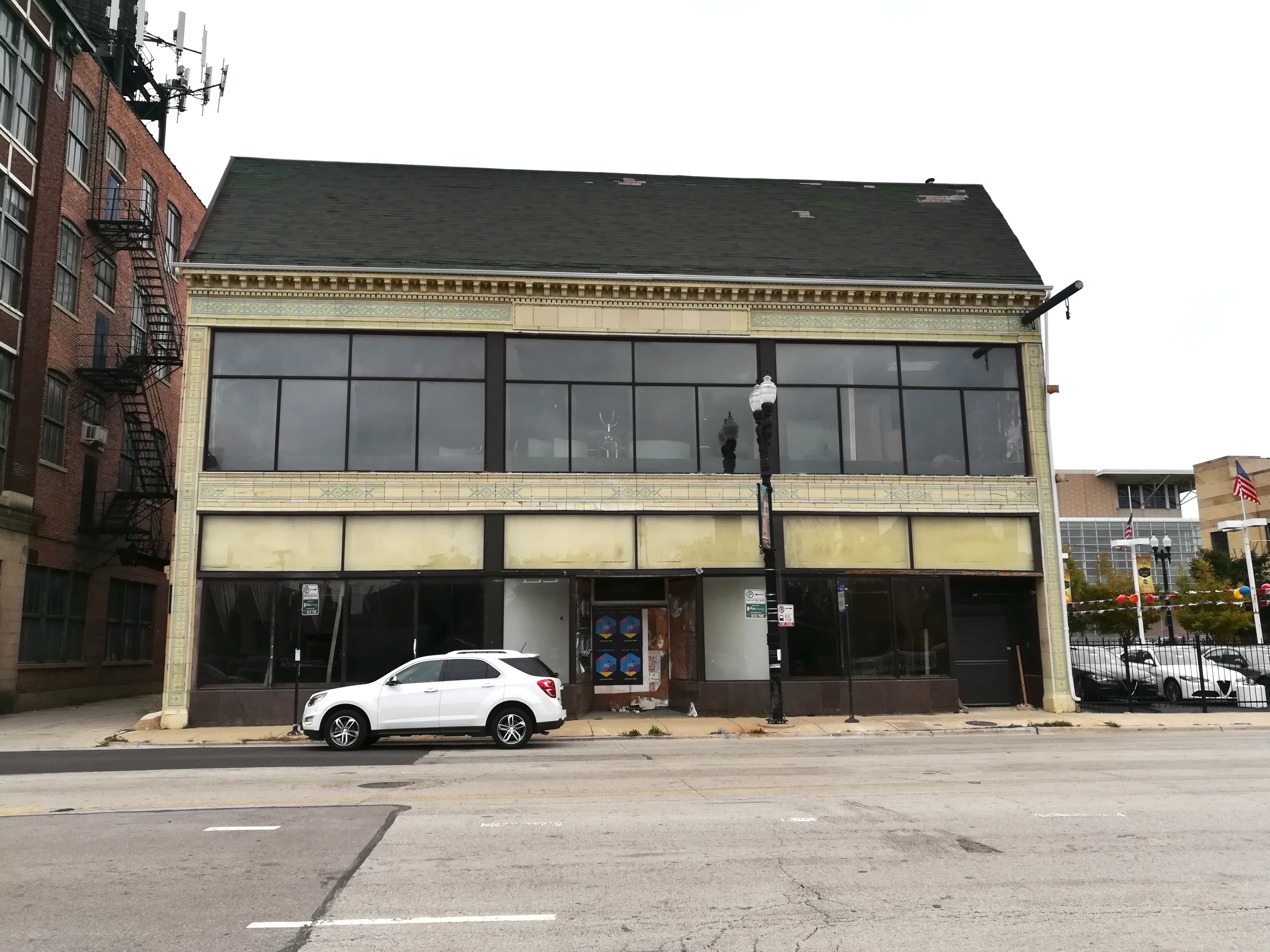
- Building in which the club was located, photographed in 2017
- Date: February 17, 2003; 23 years ago
- Time: 2:28 am (CST)
- Location: Epitome (E2) Nightclub 2347 South Michigan Avenue South Loop, Chicago, Illinois, U.S.; 41.8496433°N 87.6233322°W
- Cause: Panic ensued by patrons after the use of pepper spray by a security guard during a fight.
- Deaths: 21
- Injuries: 50+
- Suspects: Calvin Hollins Jr. Dwain Kyles
- Charges: a) 21-counts of involuntary manslaughter b) several building code violations
- Convictions: a) acquitted b) 2 years' probation

The E2 Nightclub Stampede occurred on February 17, 2003, at the E2 nightclub above the Epitome restaurant at 2347 South Michigan Avenue in the South Loop neighborhood of Chicago, Illinois, in which 21 people died and more than 50 were injured when panic ensued from the use of pepper spray by a security guard to break up a fight. The club's owners were convicted of criminal contempt for their persistent failure to keep the facility up to code, and sentenced to two years' probation.

== Incident ==
The stampede was triggered by club security using pepper spray to break up a fight. Several patrons close to the commotion experienced vomiting or fainting from the spray's noxious fumes; others, their memory of the September 11 attacks seventeen months before still fresh in their minds and believing the club to have been hit with poison gas in a terrorist attack, rushed towards the exit. The exit was the steep front stairwell leading to the main entrance on the ground floor, the narrow doors of which opened inward—‌a fire code violation. Additionally, while the doors were normally kept open during business hours, they had been closed after the fight participants were ejected. Although at least one emergency exit was opened by a security guard, there were disputed reports of another chained shut. People climbing the stairs were knocked down and pinned by the crowd. As security attempted to pull them to safety, the heap of bodies reached six feet in height as more than 1,500 people fled the perceived threat. While trying to free trapped patrons, E2 guard Ira Navarro heard other clubbers atop the stairs laughing at the fracas, unaware of the fatalities.

== Victims ==
Twenty-one patrons—‌twelve women and nine men, between the ages of 19 and 43—‌died from compressional asphyxiation and more than 50 others were injured.

== Legal ==
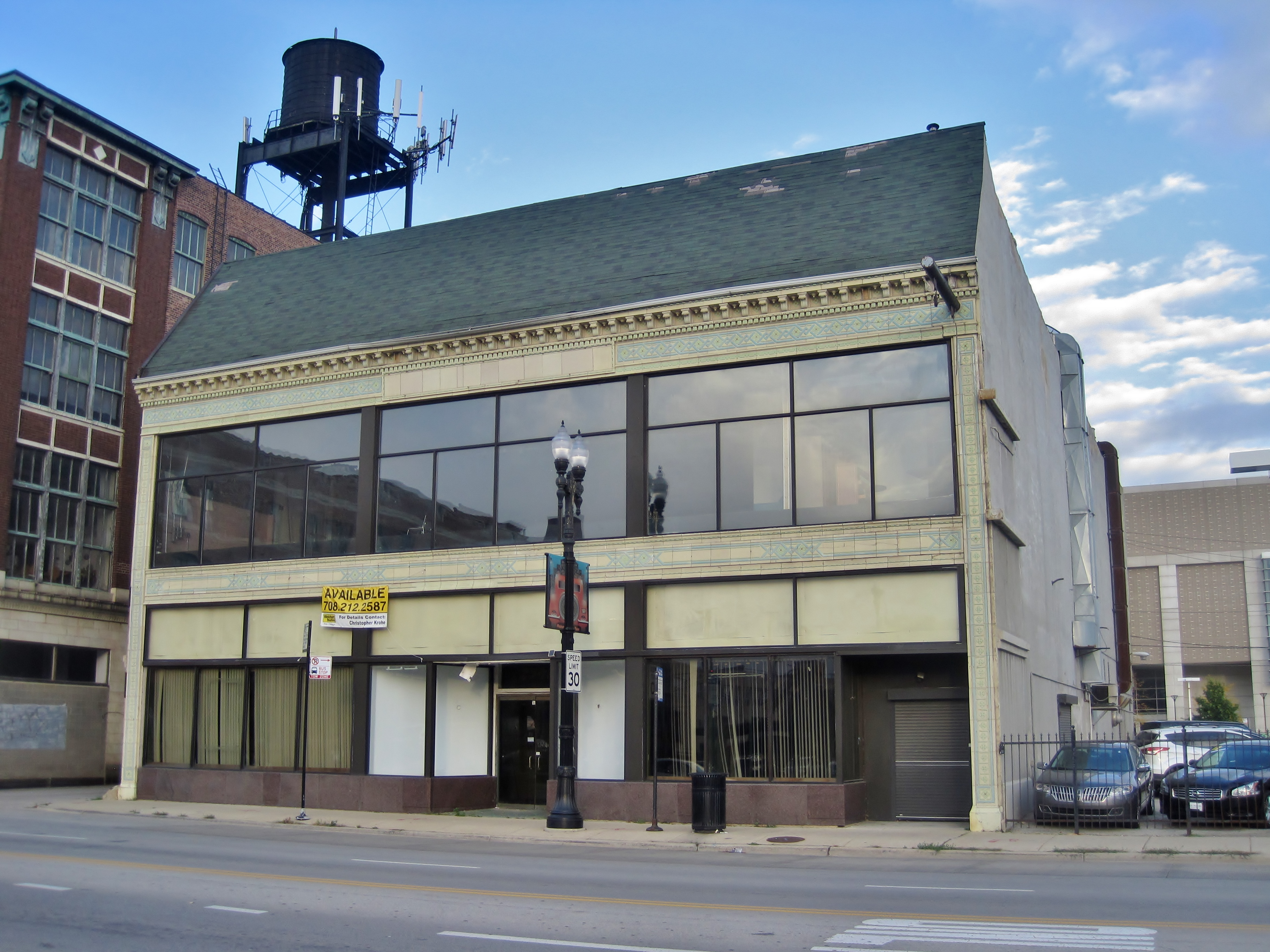
Former site of the club, photographed in 2013

A number of controversies arose from the case. A city-issued court order showed that the owners, Dwain Kyles and Calvin Hollins, were guilty of eleven building code violations, including overcrowding and faulty exit lighting. Police were called to the location 80 times during the two years prior to the stampede. Kyles and Hollins had been ordered to shut down the second-floor club in 2002. Their attorneys claimed that the court order related only to a raised VIP section of the club, not the entire second floor of the building. City inspectors then believed the facility's only business thereafter came from the ground floor Epitome Chicago restaurant, which the club attorneys said was false as police officers (both on and off duty) regularly handled the persistently large crowds, and club advertisements were common on radio and the internet.

During the January 2007 trial, the prosecution claimed the club's security staff were not properly trained. Security guard Samuel Bone testified to using pepper spray to disband a group of fifteen brawling clubbers. He said he was indeed trained in the proper use of pepper spray by the nonprofit Illinois Police Reserve Patrol. On November 25, 2009, Kyles and Hollins were acquitted of involuntary manslaughter charges, but were found guilty of indirect criminal contempt for violating the court order to close the entire second floor of the club and were sentenced to two years' probation.

E2 and Epitome both permanently closed after the incident. On November 16, 2011, the ruling was overturned when a judge ruled that the court order to close the second floor was ambiguous. On April 4, 2013, the Illinois Supreme Court unanimously overturned the 2011 ruling and upheld the 2009 conviction of criminal contempt, calling the court order "certain, clear and concise."

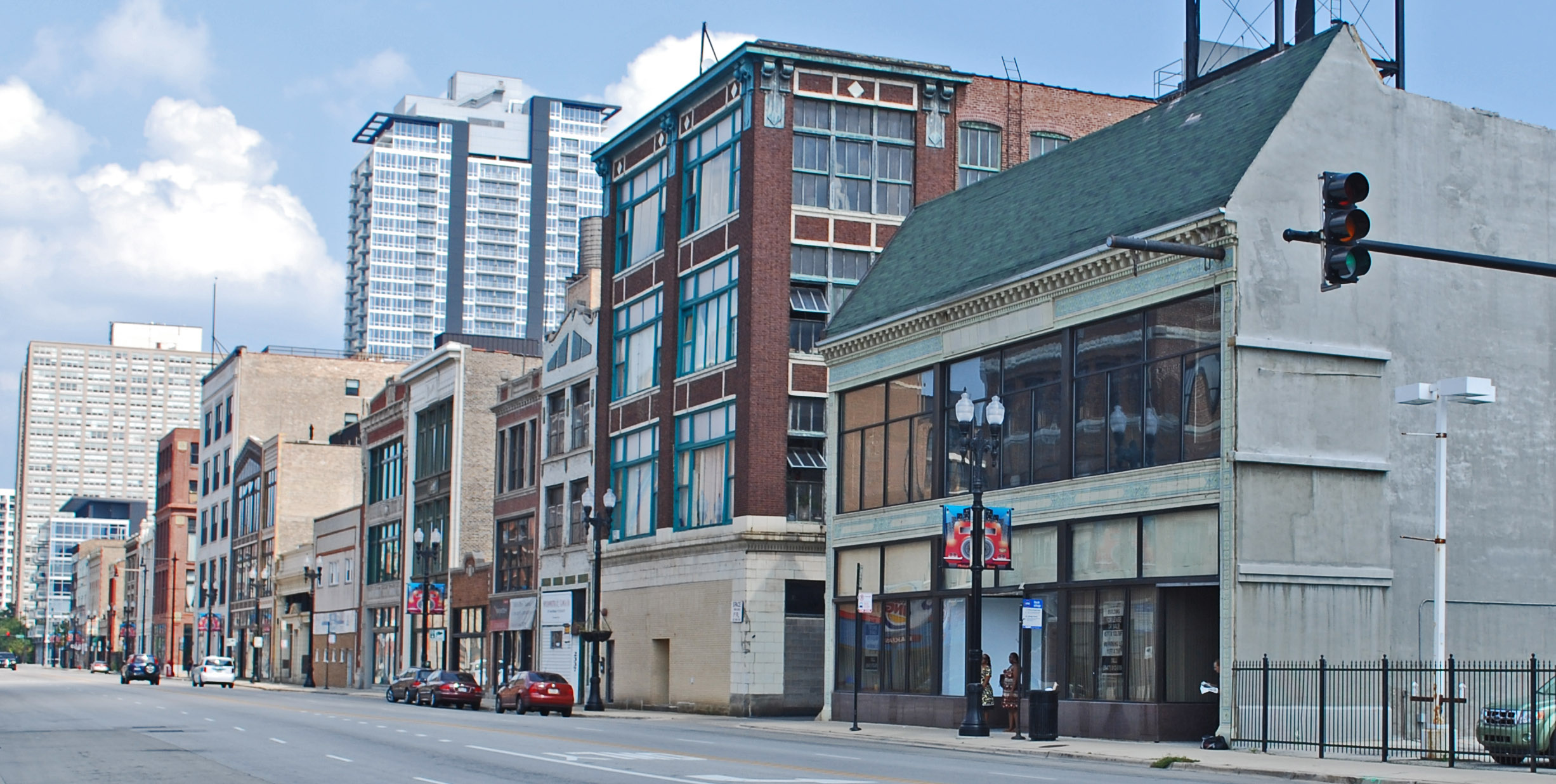
The disused building which housed nightclub (right, photographed in 2010) was located in the Motor Row District

The building in which the club was located went unused after the stampede. Plans were proposed in 2021 to demolish the structure and redevelop the property with an affordable housing development for senior citizens, with a memorial to the victims of the stampede to be included in designs. This will require rezoning, which has not yet occurred. In November 2024, the Commission Chicago Landmarks denied the developer a permit to demolish the building, which is a contributing property to the Motor Row Historic District. However, two weeks later in December 2024 an emergency order was issued by the Chicago's Department of Buildings for its demolition, citing structural dangers of the state of the building. Soon after, work to demolish the structure began.

== See also ==
- The Station nightclub fire, fatal fire in Rhode Island three days later.
