= Cadillac Automobile Company Building =

- U.S. National Register of Historic Places
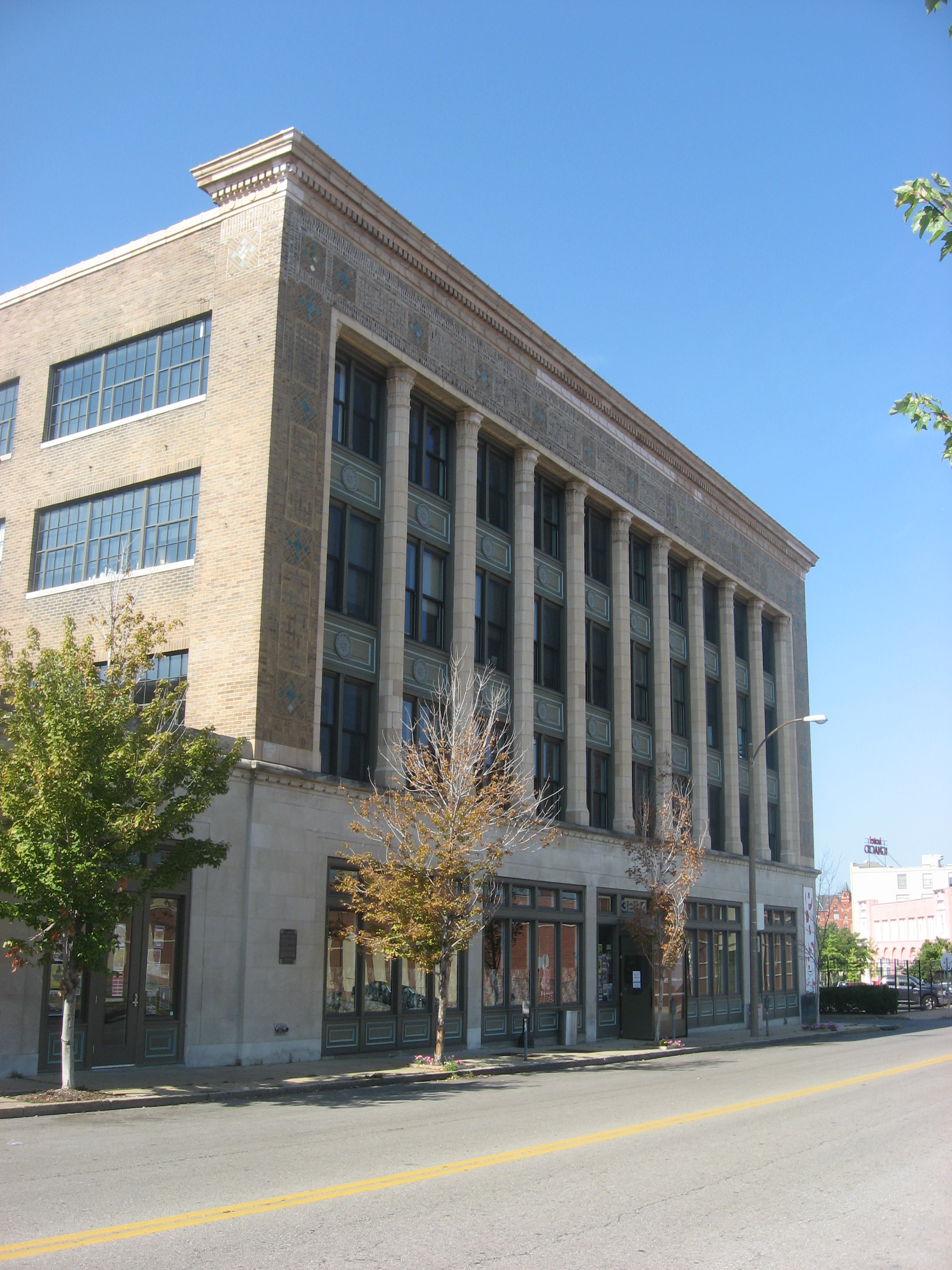

- Location within Missouri
- Location: 3224 Locust St., St. Louis, Missouri
- Coordinates: 38°38′12″N 90°13′35″W
- Area: 1 acre (0.40 ha)
- Built: 1919
- Built by: Balsh, William A.
- Architectural style: Classical Revival, Second Egyptian Revival
- MPS: Auto-Related Resources of St. Louis, Missouri MPS
- NRHP reference No.: 05000812
- Added to NRHP: August 4, 2005

The Cadillac Automobile Company Building, at 3224 Locust St. in St. Louis, Missouri, was built in 1919. It was listed on the National Register of Historic Places in 2005.

It was designed by Detroit, Michigan architect William A. Balsh. It is a four-story tile and concrete-framed building with basement, with curtain wall construction. It has a parapeted flat roof. It has "the symmetry, colossal portico and entablature that characterize Neoclassical commercial buildings, but its use of Second Egyptian Revival stylistic details, especially the stylized column capitals, draws attention to both of its monolithic street elevations."

It was an auto distributorship building.
