= Studebaker Building (St. Petersburg, Florida) =

- U.S. National Register of Historic Places
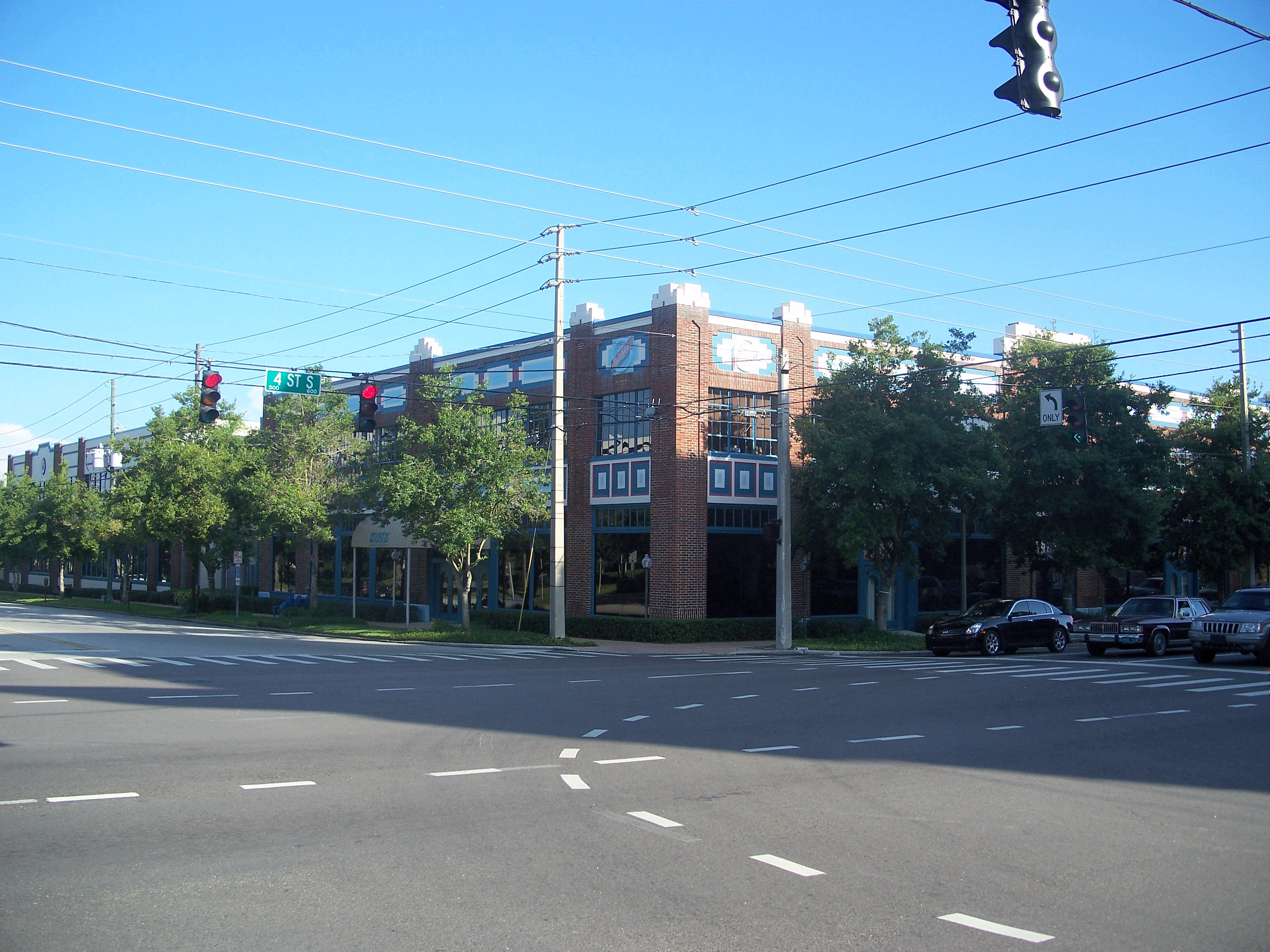

- Location within Florida Location within the United States
- Location: St. Petersburg, Florida
- Coordinates: 27°45′49″N 82°38′18″W
- Architectural style: Tudor Revival
- NRHP reference No.: 85001485
- Added to NRHP: July 5, 1985

The Studebaker Building (now home to the USGS St. Petersburg Coastal and Marine Science Center) is a historic site in St. Petersburg, Florida. It is located at 600 4th Street South. On July 5, 1985, it was added to the U.S. National Register of Historic Places.

Built in 1925, the Studebaker Building is historically significant for its association with the Florida Land Boom of the 1920s and the relationship of the automobile industry and suburbanization. The building symbolizes the importance of the Studebaker automobile within that industry in the 1920s, particularly the Peninsular Motor Company of southwest Florida, the fourth largest Studebaker dealer in volume in the country by 1925. When the building opened, the company was the fourth largest Studebaker dealer in the world. The company employed 300 people, with 56 working in St. Petersburg's showroom. However, by 1926 the Peninsular Motor Company went bankrupt as a result of the collapse of the boom, and the Studebaker Building was closed.
