= Buick Automobile Company Building =

- U.S. National Register of Historic Places
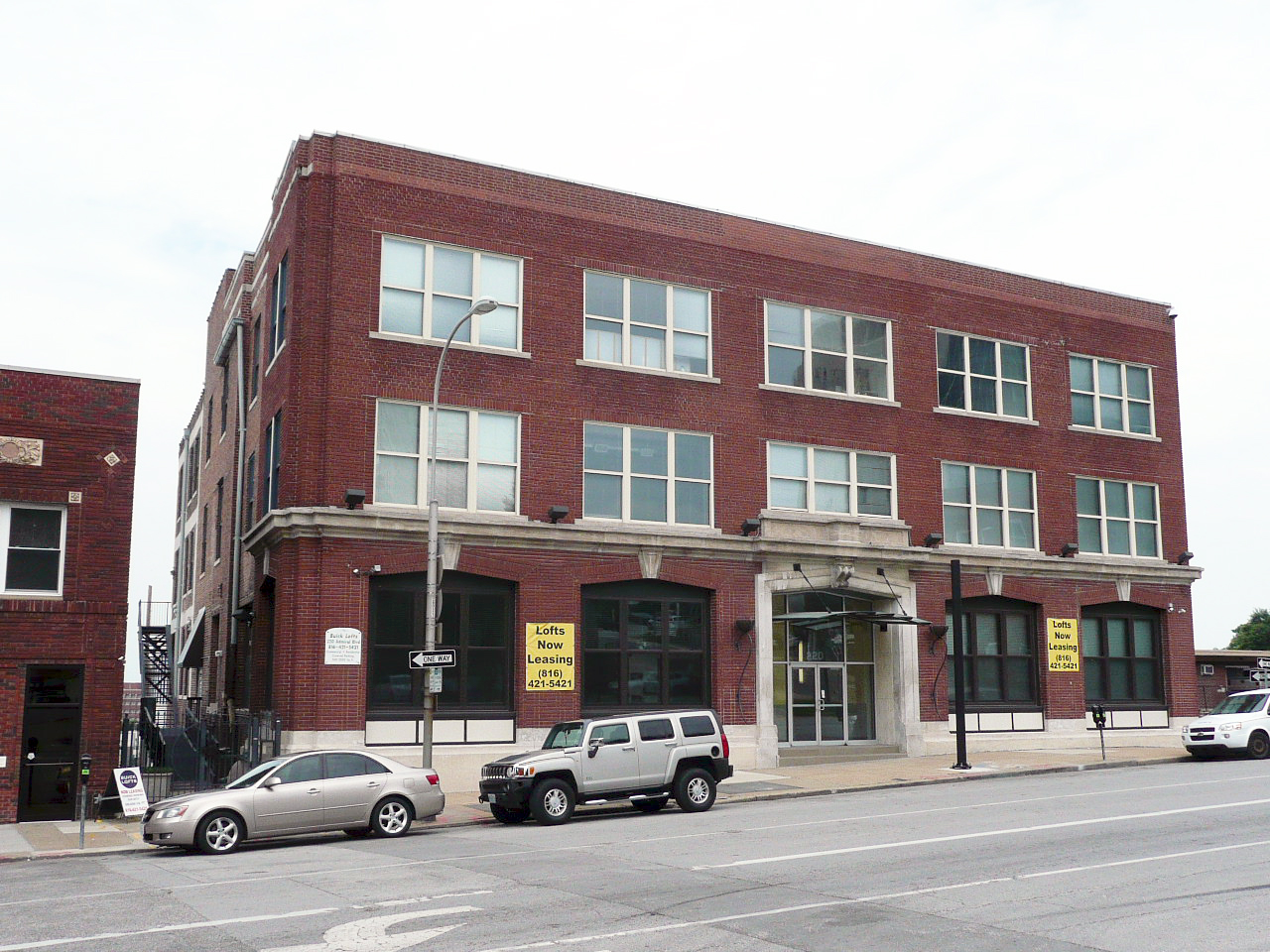
- The building as seen in 2015

- Location within Missouri Location within the United States
- Location: 216 Admiral Blvd., Kansas City, Missouri
- Coordinates: 39°06′20″N 94°34′48″W
- Area: less than one acre
- Built: 1907-08, c.1934, 1958
- Built by: George L. Brown (original 1907-08 building)
- Architect: Frank S. Rea (original 1907-08 building);
- Architectural style: Tudor Revival
- NRHP reference No.: 04000386
- Added to NRHP: May 5, 2004

The Buick Automobile Company Building, at 216 Admiral Blvd. in Kansas City, Missouri, was built in 1907. It was listed on the National Register of Historic Places in 2004.

It is a three-story brick building with elements of Tudor Revival style. It is supported by cast-iron columns, steel girders and heavy timbered joists, and was designed by architect Frank S. Rea. A three-story brick addition was added around 1934, and a two-story extension to the rear was added in 1958.

The building included an automobile showroom on the first floor, auto repair shops in the basement and on the third floor, and a garage on the second floor.
