= Jennings Ford Automobile Dealership =

- U.S. National Register of Historic Places
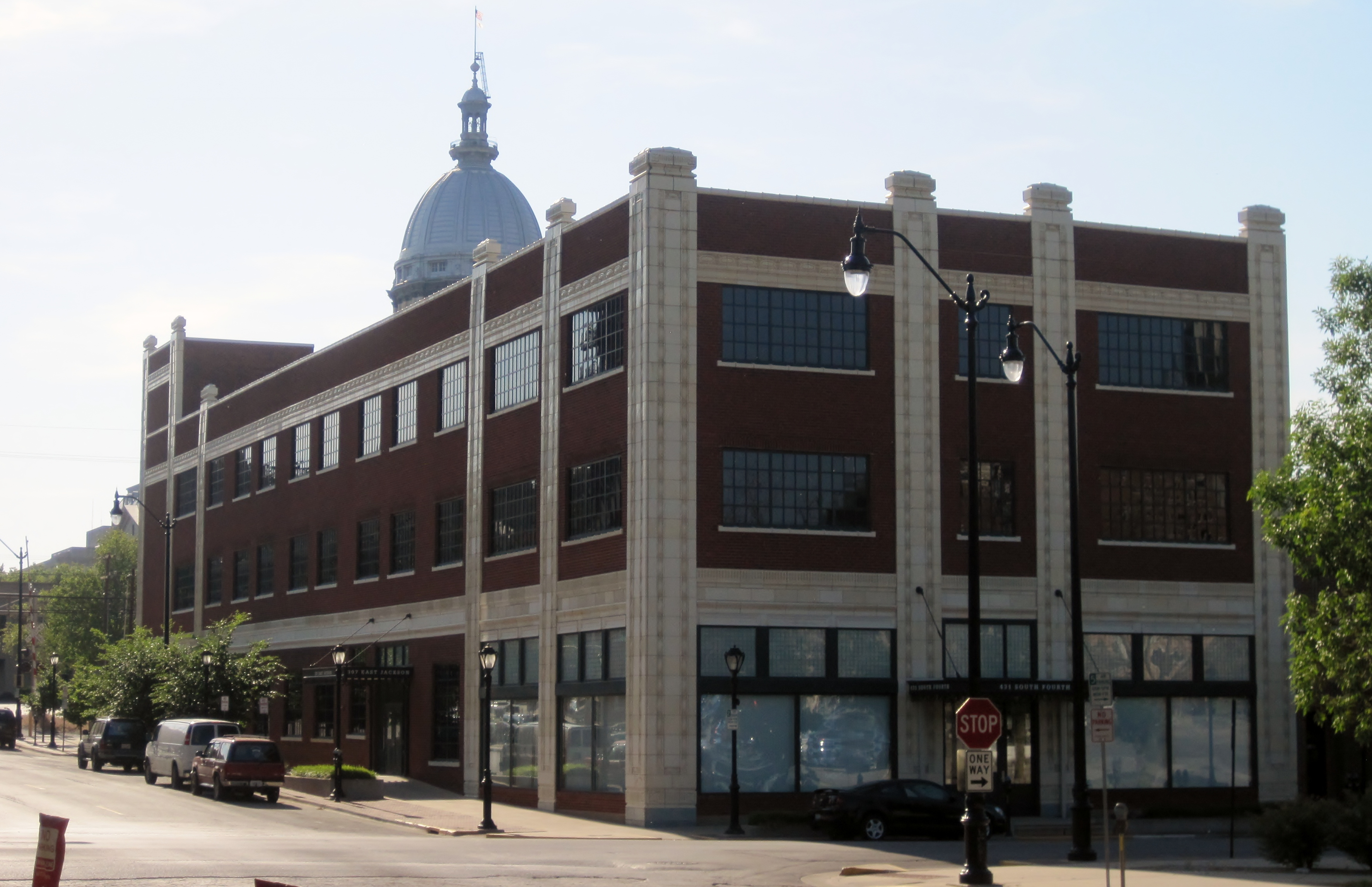

- Location within Illinois Location within the United States
- Location: 431 S. Fourth St., Springfield, Illinois
- Coordinates: 39°47′51″N 89°39′4″W
- Area: less than one acre
- Architect: Harry Reiger
- Architectural style: Early Commercial
- NRHP reference No.: 06000450
- Added to NRHP: May 31, 2006

The Jennings Ford Automobile Dealership is a historic automobile dealership located at 431 South 4th Street in Springfield, Illinois. Ford dealer Frank Jennings built the dealership in 1919. The automobile became widespread in Springfield in the 1910s; Jennings Ford was one of several dealerships to open on South 4th Street, which was then the city's automobile row. The three-story building integrated every major function of an auto dealership at the time; it included a sales floor, a service center, a car wash, a storage garage, and a repainting facility. While Jennings Ford closed between 1927 and 1933, the building remained a car dealership through the 1950s. It is one of the few remaining dealership buildings in downtown Springfield and is the best-preserved of the survivors. Today, the building houses an operations center for Illinois National Bank.

The building was added to the National Register of Historic Places on May 31, 2006.
