= 1901 McGee Street Automotive Service Building =

- U.S. National Register of Historic Places
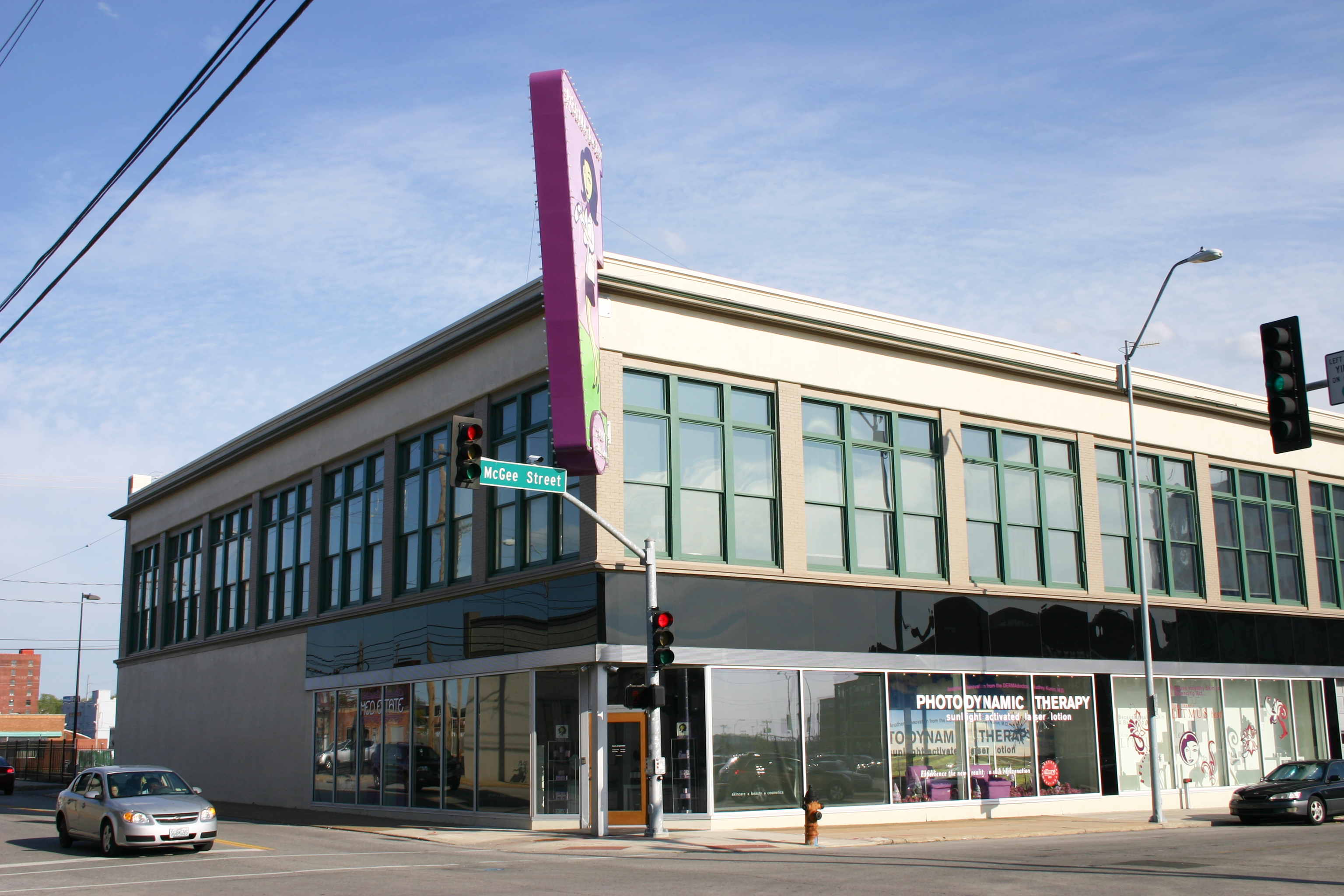

- Location within Missouri Location within the United States
- Location: 1901-1907 McGee St., Kansas City, Missouri
- Coordinates: 39°05′25″N 94°34′48″W
- Area: less than one acre
- Built: 1912
- Built by: Smith, C.C.
- Architectural style: Early Commercial
- NRHP reference No.: 08001359
- Added to NRHP: January 22, 2009

The 1901 McGee Street Automotive Service Building, located at 1901 McGee St. in Kansas City, Missouri, was built in 1912. It was listed on the National Register of Historic Places in 2009.

It is a two-story two part commercial block building, 99 by 111 feet (30 m × 34 m) in plan, built with hollow tile walls by builder/architect C.C. Smith. The building " deftly illustrates the specialized adaptation of a typical main street commercial building for automobile sales and service functions. As the popularity of automobiles soared, real estate investors constructed this building near the heart of Kansas City’s nascent Automobile Row. By blending a traditional commercial façade with physical elements that addressed the specific needs of automobile sales and service, the building met the needs of tenants and consumers. Distinctive features include large storefront windows on the first story, which gave passersby a clear view of the vehicles for sale inside; large expanses of over-sized windows on the second story and skylights in the roof, which provided ample light and ventilation to work areas on the second floor; and an oversized freight elevator capable of transporting vehicles, as well as auto parts, from the back alley to the first floor or the second floor. Most notable, though, is the building’s highly unique structural system, which supplements a typical early-twentieth century masonry and wood structure with massive steel I-beams that span the ceiling on the first floor and distinctive turnbuckle trusses that hang from the ceiling on the second floor. These structural enhancements responded to the very heavy loads the building had to support to serve its intended function. The automotive service building at 1901 McGee Street clearly embodies this type and period of commercial design and is characteristic example of the automotive service buildings that survive from the heyday of Kansas City’s automobile row. The period of significance, 1912 – 1941, reflects the dates of construction and a significant renovation."
