= Young Brothers Chevrolet Garage =

- U.S. National Register of Historic Places
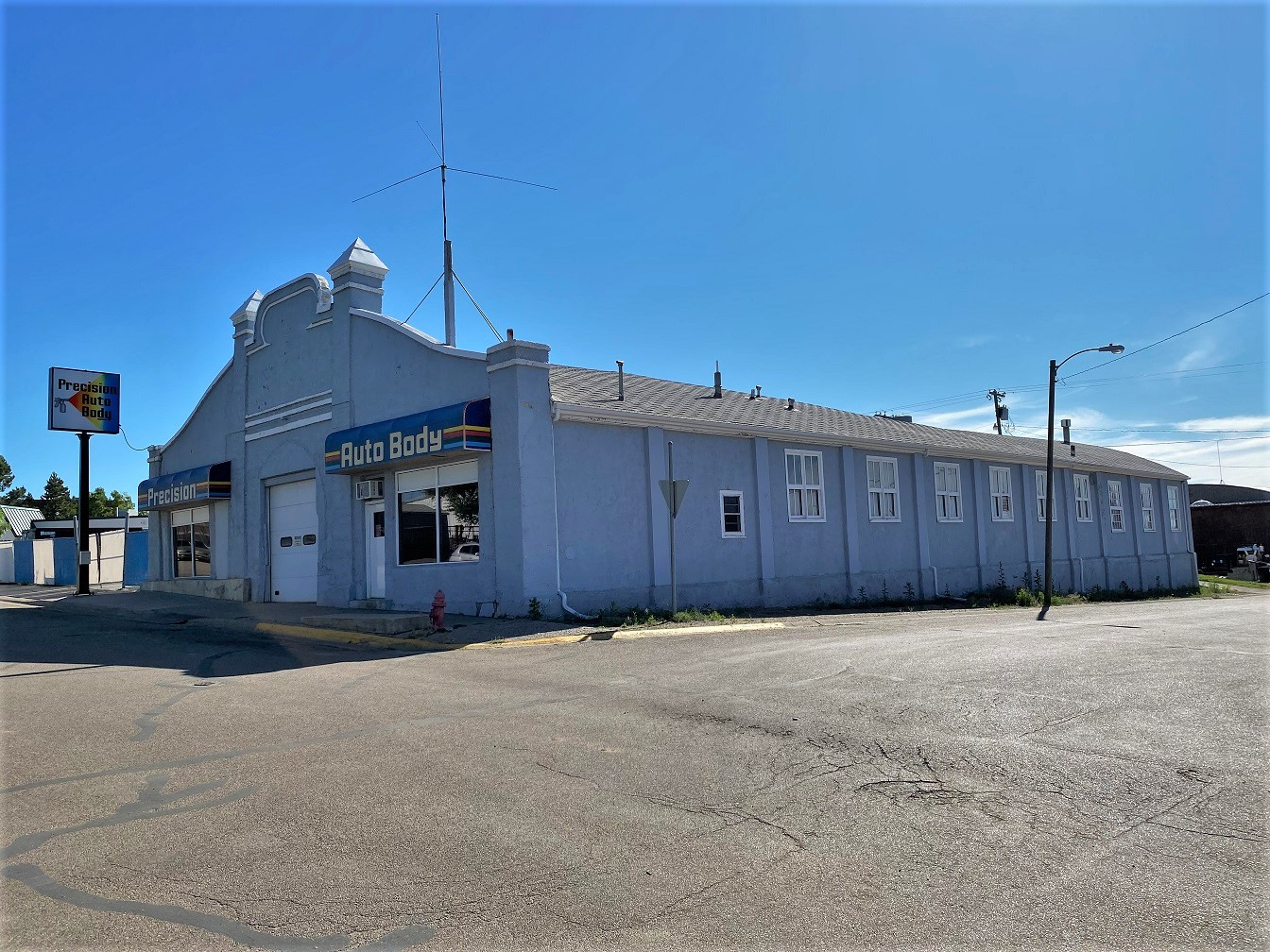

- Location within Montana Location within the United States
- Location: 201 Pennsylvania St. Chinook, Montana
- Coordinates: 48°35′38″N 109°13′54″W
- Area: less than one acre
- Built: 1912
- Architectural style: Mission/Spanish Revival
- MPS: Roadside Architecture Along US 2 in Montana MPS
- NRHP reference No.: 94000867
- Added to NRHP: August 16, 1994

The Young Brothers Chevrolet Garage is a site on the National Register of Historic Places located in Chinook, Montana. It has also been known as AAA Garage, as Taylor Motor Company, as Tilleman Chevrolet, and as Precision Auto Body. It was added to the Register on August 16, 1994. It is a stucco building with an asphalt roof.

A placard reads:

A garage/automotive business has served the motoring public at this location since 1912, establishing a long pattern of similar use rarely found in Montana buildings. Although the building was possibly built as a livery stable, it was soon converted to an auto garage, which catered to US 2 travelers and local residents. In 1929, brothers Neil and Hollis Young bought the business, known in the 1920s as the Triple A Garage, and moved their automotive shop here from across the street. The Youngs owned the local Chevrolet dealership, and within five years they had also purchased Pontiac and Oldsmobile franchises, offering Chinook residents a fine choice of General Motors products. Typical of most small-town dealerships, gasoline and petroleum sales supplemented automotive sales and repair. Primarily an outlet for Conoco, the pumps also dispensed Grizzly gas from Cut Bank and Silver gas from Great Falls. In 1939, S. L. Taylor purchased the business and it remained the Taylor Motor Company until 1977. The gas pumps were removed and the franchise closed under owner Mike Tilleman in 1979. Former Tilleman employee Wesley Bevis purchased the facility in the early 1980s and opened his own business, Precision Auto Body, continuing the long tradition of auto service at this location. The building itself is an outstanding example of the Mission style, an architectural form not often found in the Rocky Mountain/Great Plains region. A splendid curvilinear parapet, capped pilasters, horizontal relief banding, and a smooth stucco exterior provide excellent expression of this style; its bold modernity reflects the spirited progressiveness of the early automotive era.

It sold Conoco, Grizzly, and Silver gas products in the 1930s, and it operated as a gas station into the 1970s.
