= Howard Motor Company Building =

- U.S. National Register of Historic Places
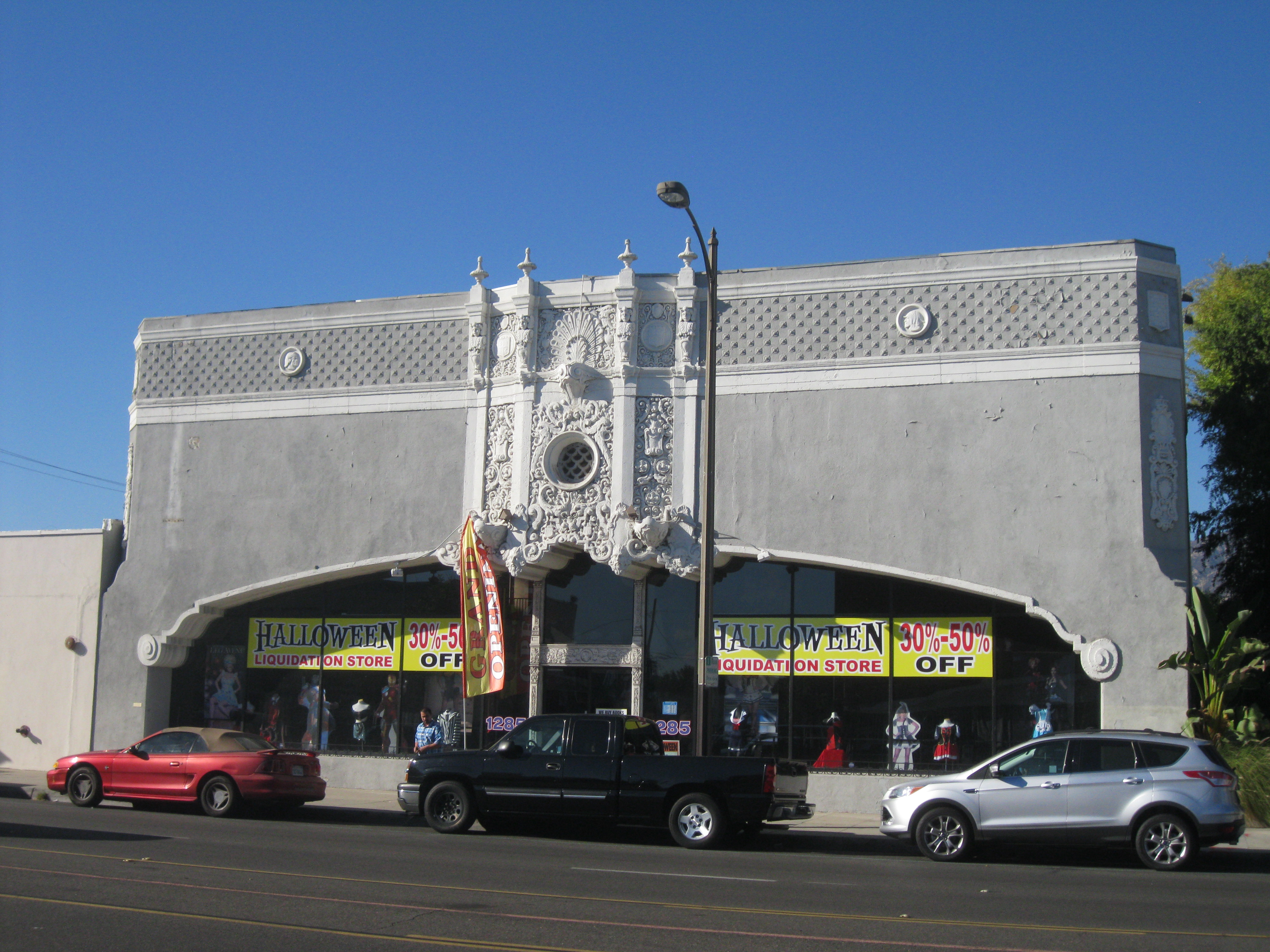

- Location within the Los Angeles metropolitan area Location within California Location within the United States
- Location: 1285 E. Colorado Blvd., Pasadena, California
- Coordinates: 34°8′47″N 118°7′26″W
- Area: less than one acre
- Built: 1927
- Built by: Austin Co. of California
- Architectural style: California Churrigueresque
- MPS: Early Automobile-Related Properties in Pasadena MPS
- NRHP reference No.: 96000422
- Added to NRHP: April 18, 1996

The Howard Motor Company Building (also known as California Custom Coach, Inc.) is a historic automobile showroom located at 1285 E. Colorado Boulevard in Pasadena, California, United States.

== Description and history ==
The Howard Motor Company built the showroom in 1927; it was one of several car dealerships built along Colorado Boulevard. The building is designed in a California Churrigueresque style of Spanish Colonial Revival architecture; its design includes a decorative frieze, chamfered corners, and an elliptical arched entrance topped by the dominant Churrigueresque element. The Bush-Morgan Motor Company moved into the building in 1938 and occupied it through the 1950s. The building was still used as an auto showroom in the 1990s.

The building was added to the National Register of Historic Places on April 18, 1996.
