= Motor Row District =

Historic district in Illinois, United States

- Motor Row Historic District
- U.S. National Register of Historic Places
- U.S. Historic district
- Chicago Landmark
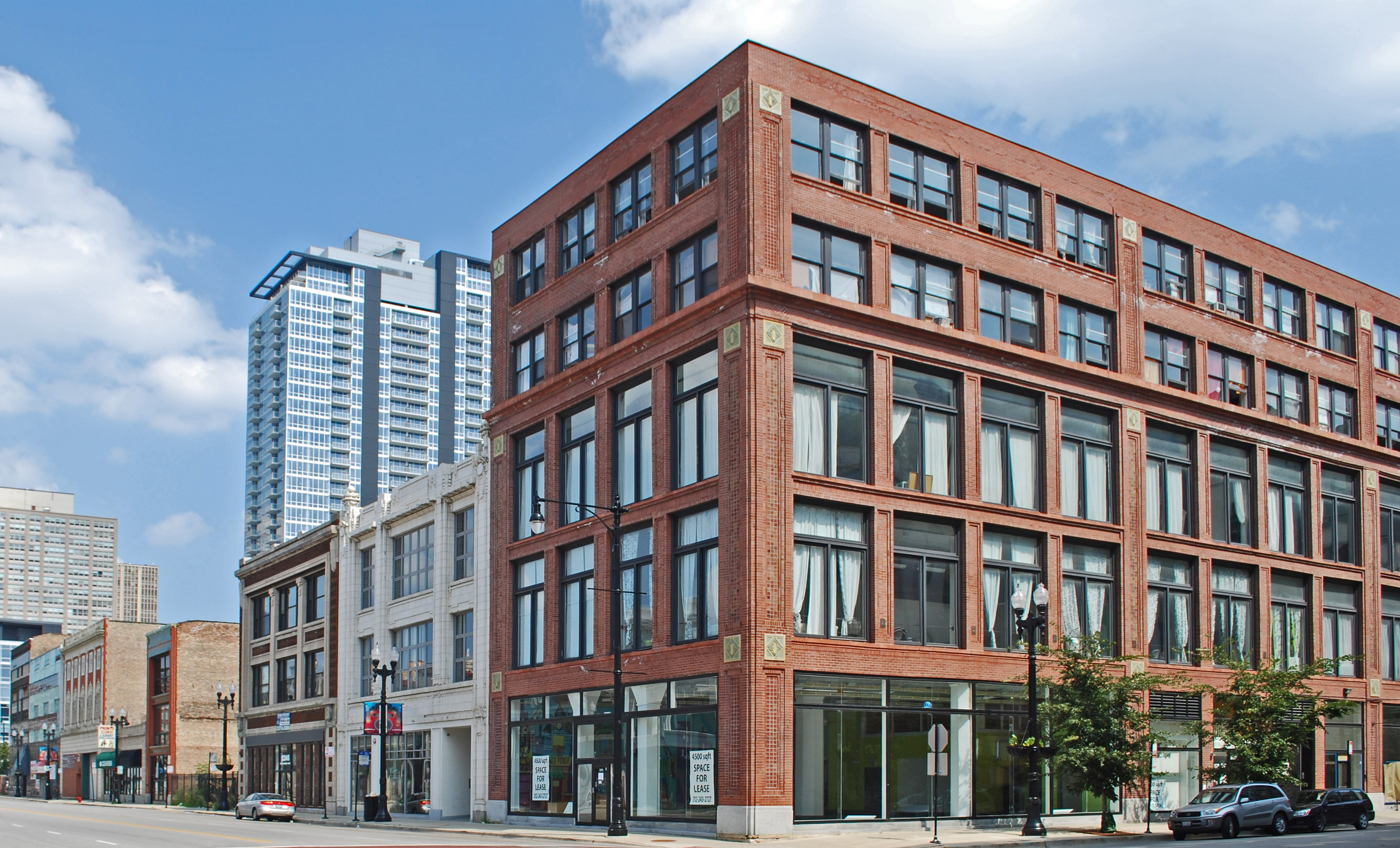

- Location within Chicago metropolitan area Location within Illinois
- Location: Chicago, Illinois
- Coordinates: 41°51′10″N 87°37′26″W
- Area: 28 acres (11 ha)
- Built: 1905-1936
- Architectural style: Early Commercial, Mission/Spanish Revival
- MPS: Motor Row, Chicago, Illinois MPS
- NRHP reference No.: 02001387

Significant dates
- Added to NRHP: 2002
- Designated CHICL: December 13, 2000

The Motor Row District is a historic district in Chicago's Near South Side community area. Motor Row includes buildings on Michigan Avenue between 2200 and 2500 south, directly west of McCormick Place convention center, and 1444, 1454, 1737, 1925, 2000 S. Michigan Ave., as well as 2246-3453 S. Indiana Ave., and 2211-47 S. Wabash Ave. The district was built between 1905 and 1936 by a number of notable architects.

Auto rows developed in numerous US cities shortly after 1900 as car companies sought to create districts where the sale and repair of cars could become an easy urban shopping experience. At its peak, as many as 116 different makes of automobiles were sold and repaired on Motor Row. Current-day marques that formerly had showrooms on Motor Row included Ford, Buick, Fiat, and Cadillac. Other marques with showrooms there that have since dissolved include Hudson, Locomobile, Marmon, and Pierce-Arrow. Currently, the remaining buildings are being redeveloped into condominiums, nightclubs, and retail storefronts.

== Architecture ==
The range of buildings in Motor Row illustrates the evolution of the automobile showroom and related product and service buildings, from simple two-story structures used for display and offices to multi-story buildings housing a variety of departments for the repair, storage, painting, and finishing of automobiles. Many of the buildings were designed by significant architects, including Holabird & Roche, Alfred Alschuler, Philip Maher, Albert Kahn, and Christian Eckstorm. The overall design highlights elaborately carved stone work, ornate facades and intricately scrolled ironwork that decorates recessed automotive doorways.

Though characterized by its auto showrooms, Motor Row was also home to newspaper The Chicago Defender, a newspaper voice for Chicago's large African American community. Chess Records was also located in Motor Row and acts such as Muddy Waters, The Rolling Stones, Willie Dixon and many other blues artists recorded there.

Motor Row was designated a Chicago Landmark on December 13, 2000. It was added to the National Register of Historic Places on November 18, 2002.

== Redevelopment ==
In recent years, Motor Row has been undergoing a transformation into a music and entertainment district. Motor Row Brewing (formerly known as Broad Shoulders Brewery) opened in the district in January 2015. Riff Music Lounge opened in the district in 2013. Motor Row Brewing closed in 2021 as a result of the COVID-19 pandemic, and shortly thereafter a new brewing company, Duneyrr, was started in the same space by two former Lagunitas employees.

In 2011–2012, local officials attempted to lure a Cheap Trick-themed restaurant, music venue and museum to the district; however, this deal fell through in 2013.

In December 2024, the building which had formerly housed the E2 nightclub was torn-down after an emergency demolition order was issued. The building had been disused over the more than two-decades since the E2 nightclub stampede occurred in 2003.

== Gallery ==
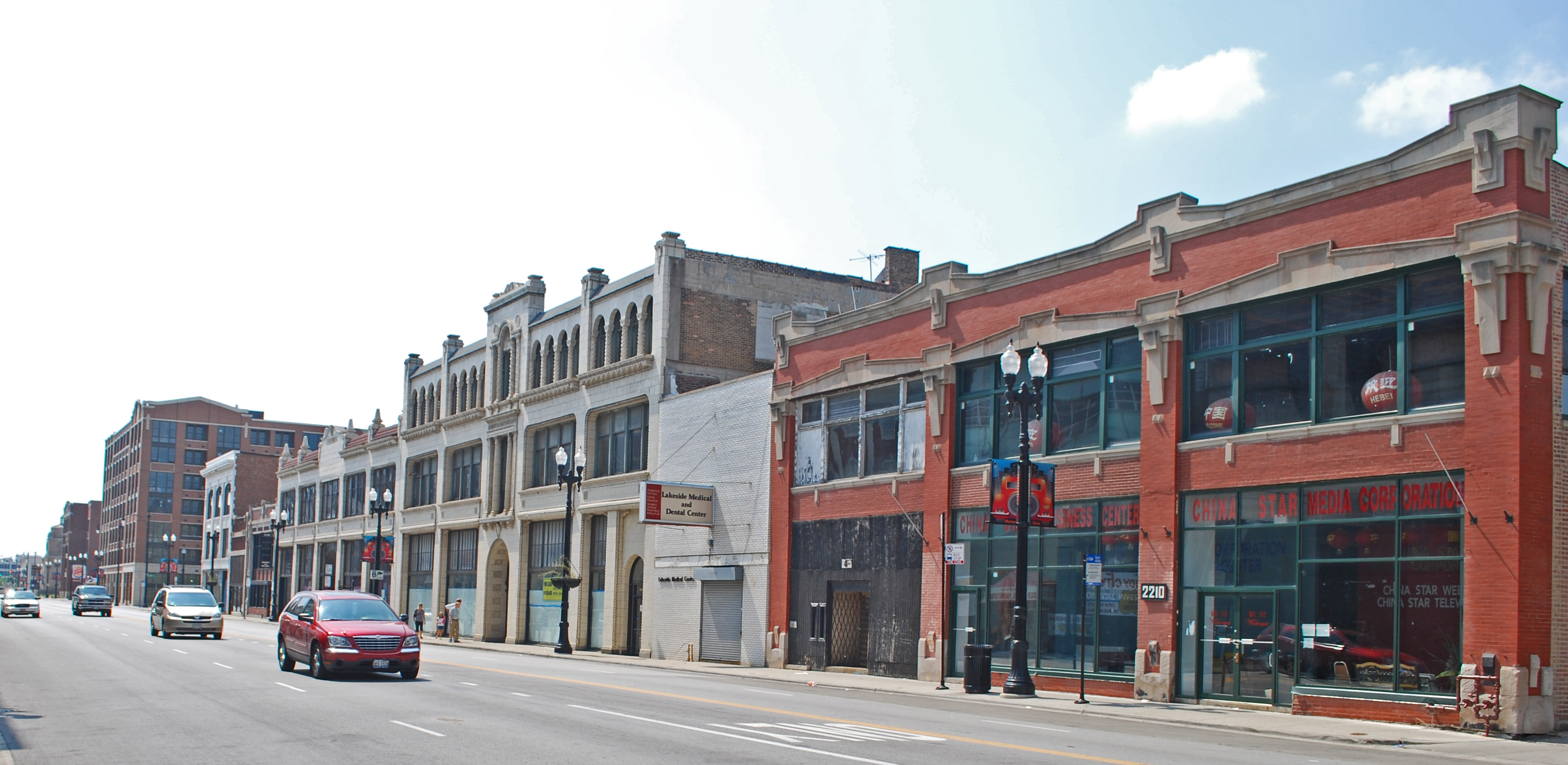
2210 S. Michigan

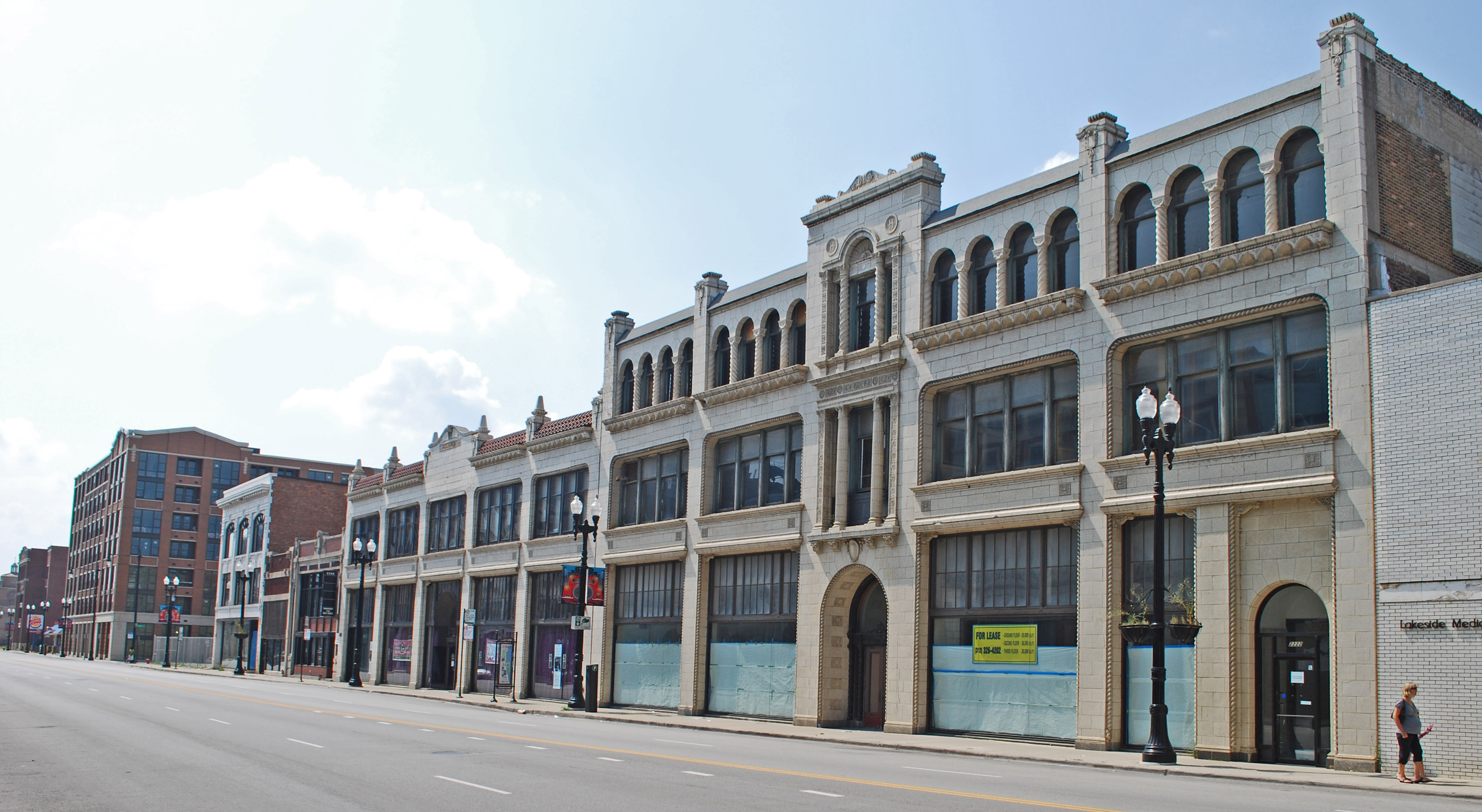
2222 S. Michigan

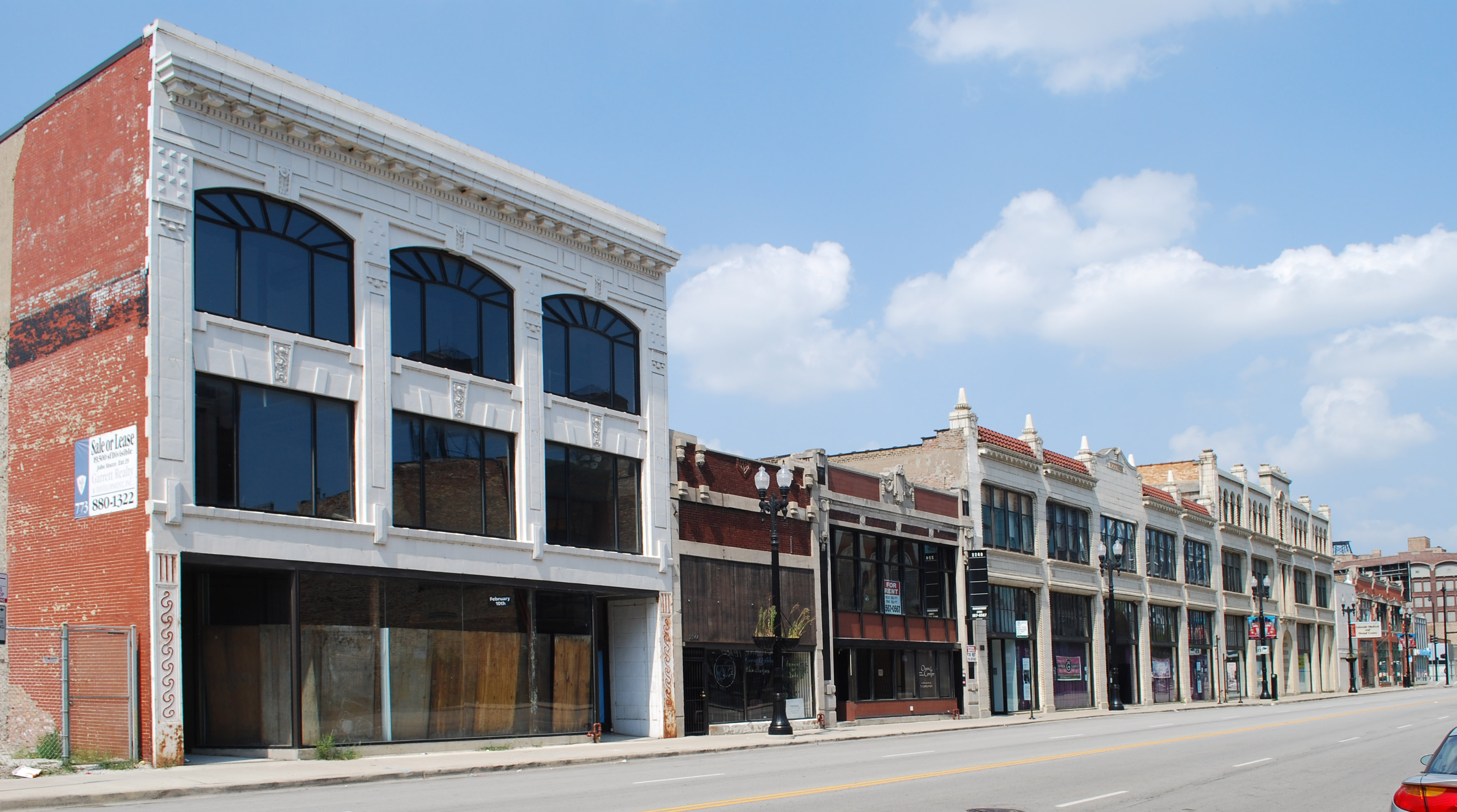
2200 block S. Michigan

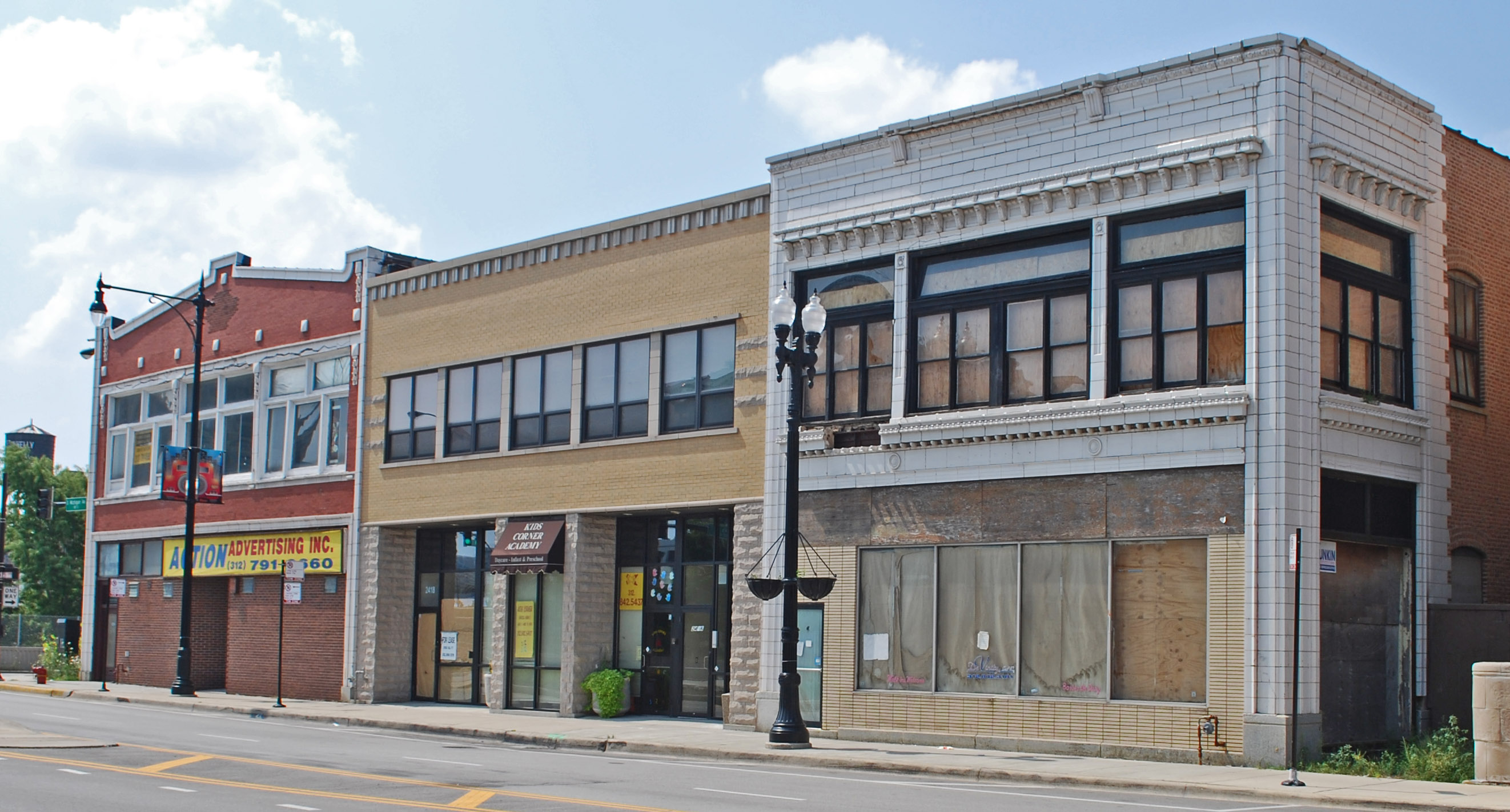
2400 block S. Michigan

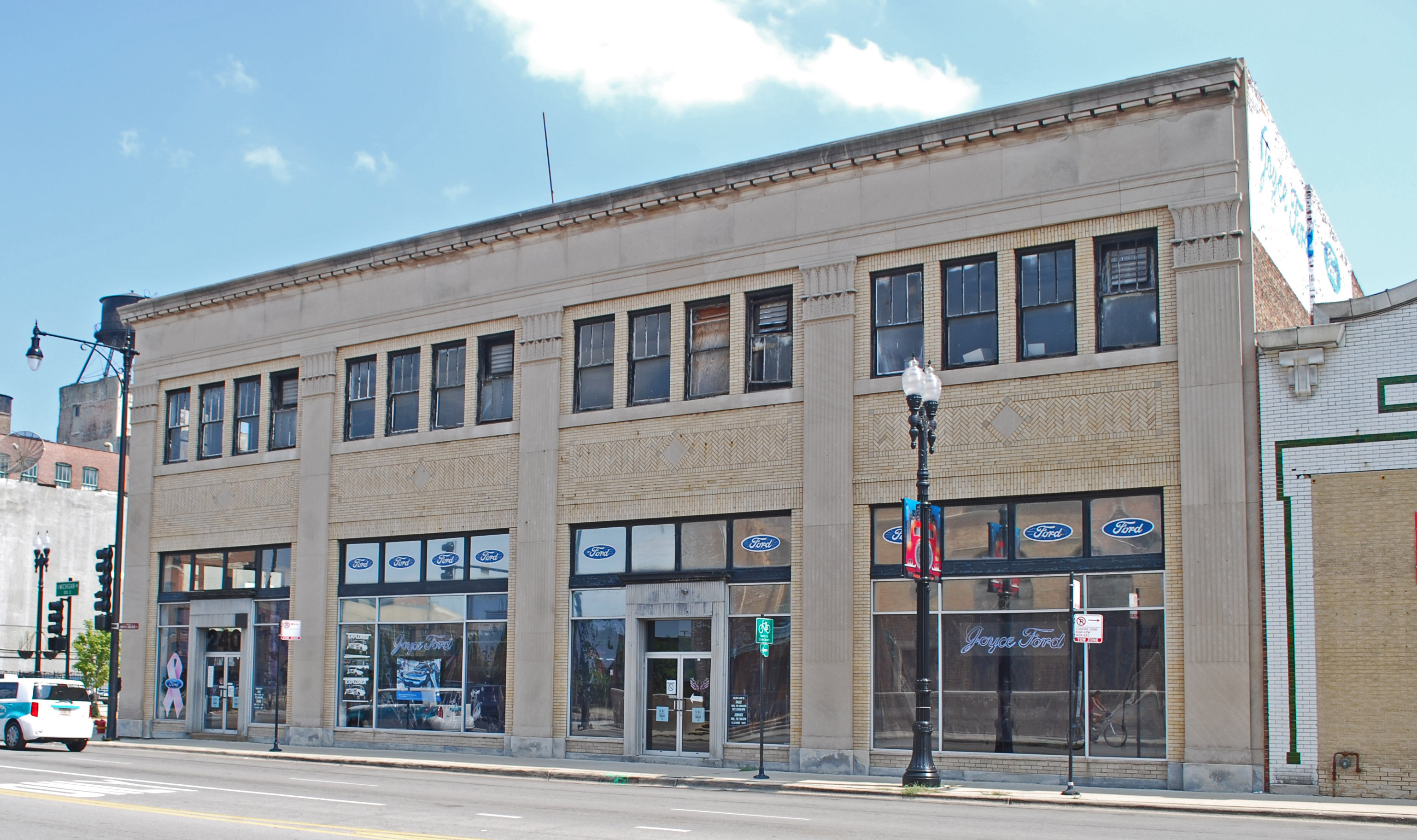
Former Joyce Ford (now vacant), 2401 S. Michigan

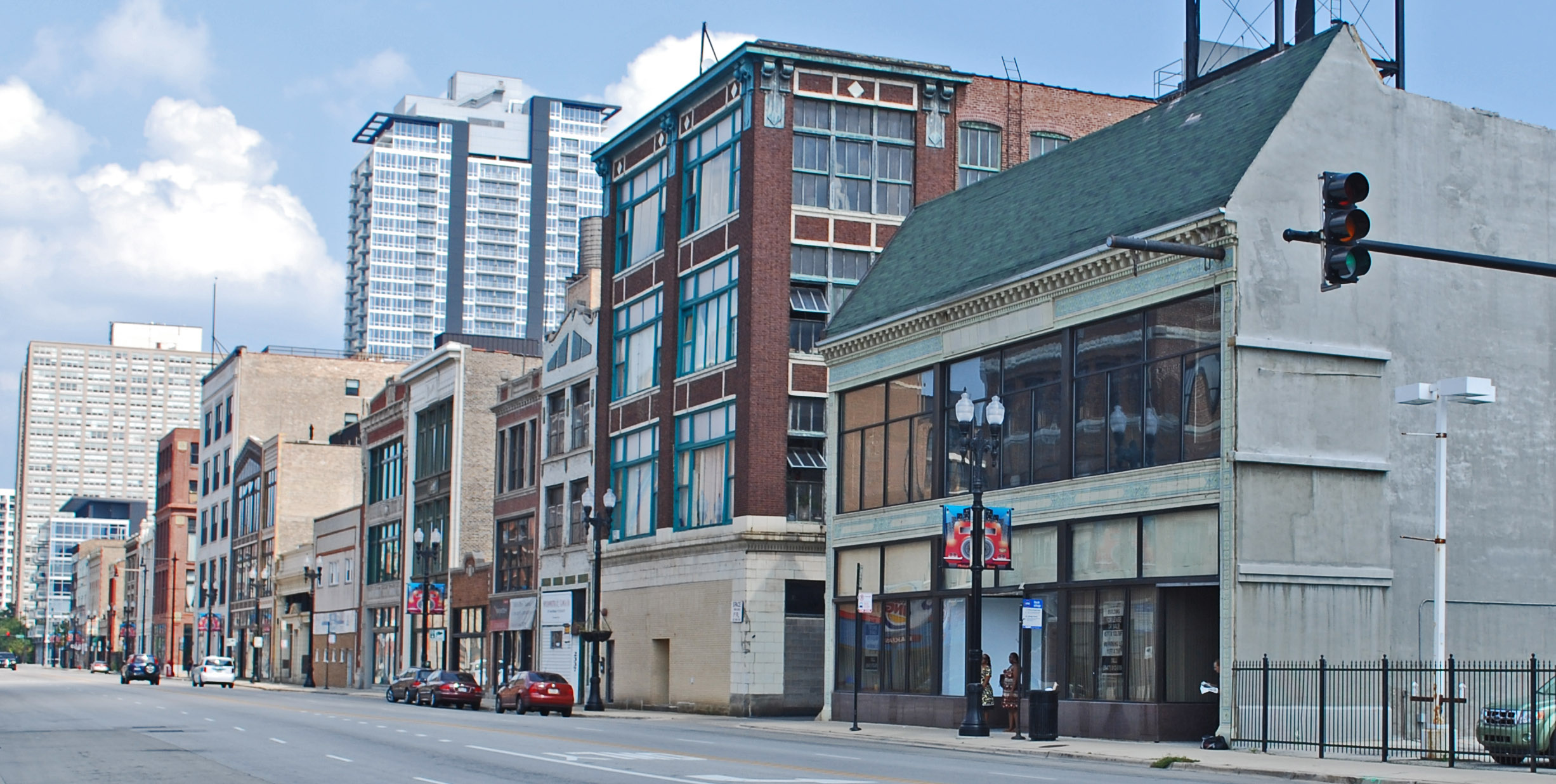
2300 block S. Michigan

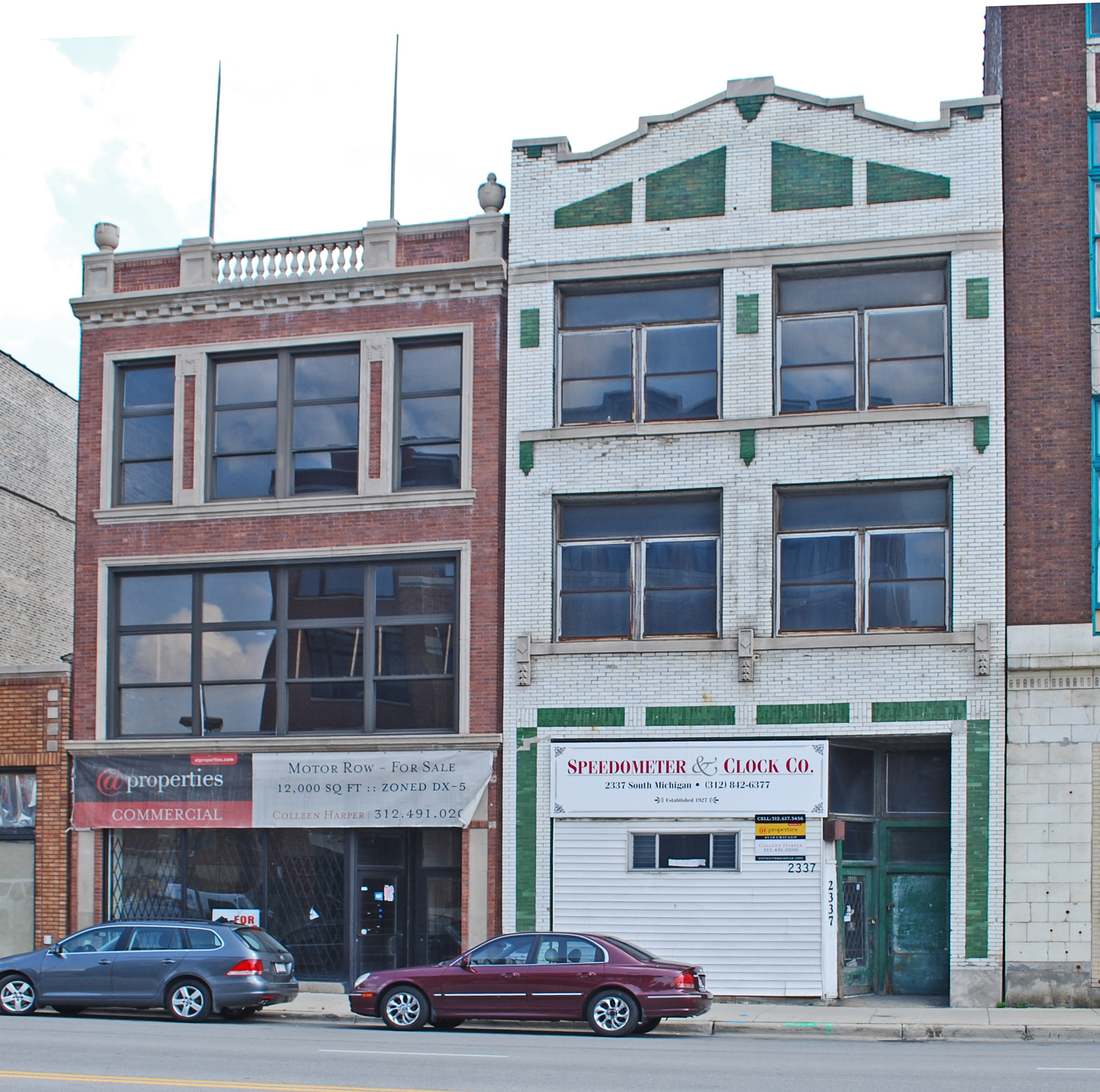
2337 S. Michigan

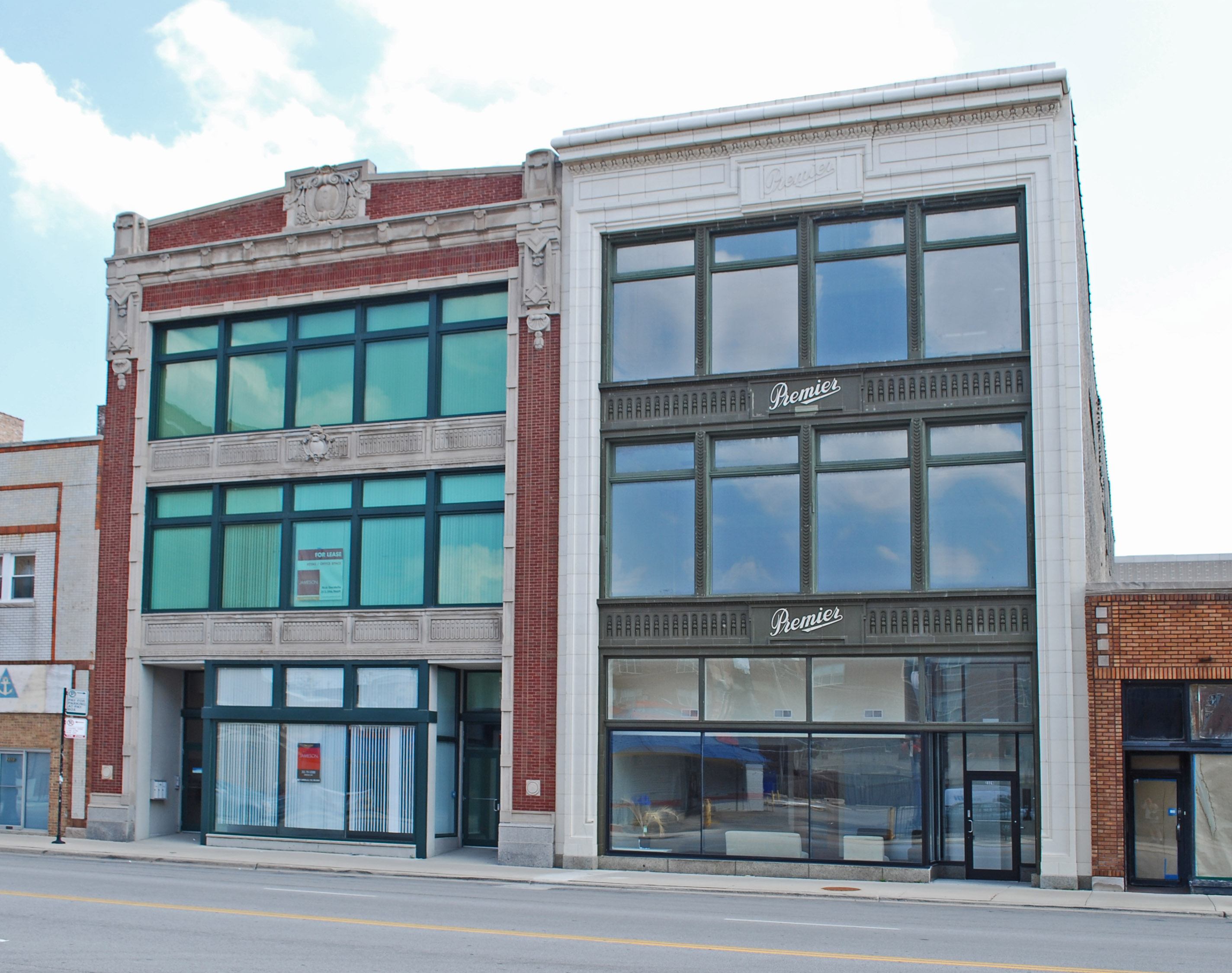
2327-2329 S. Michigan

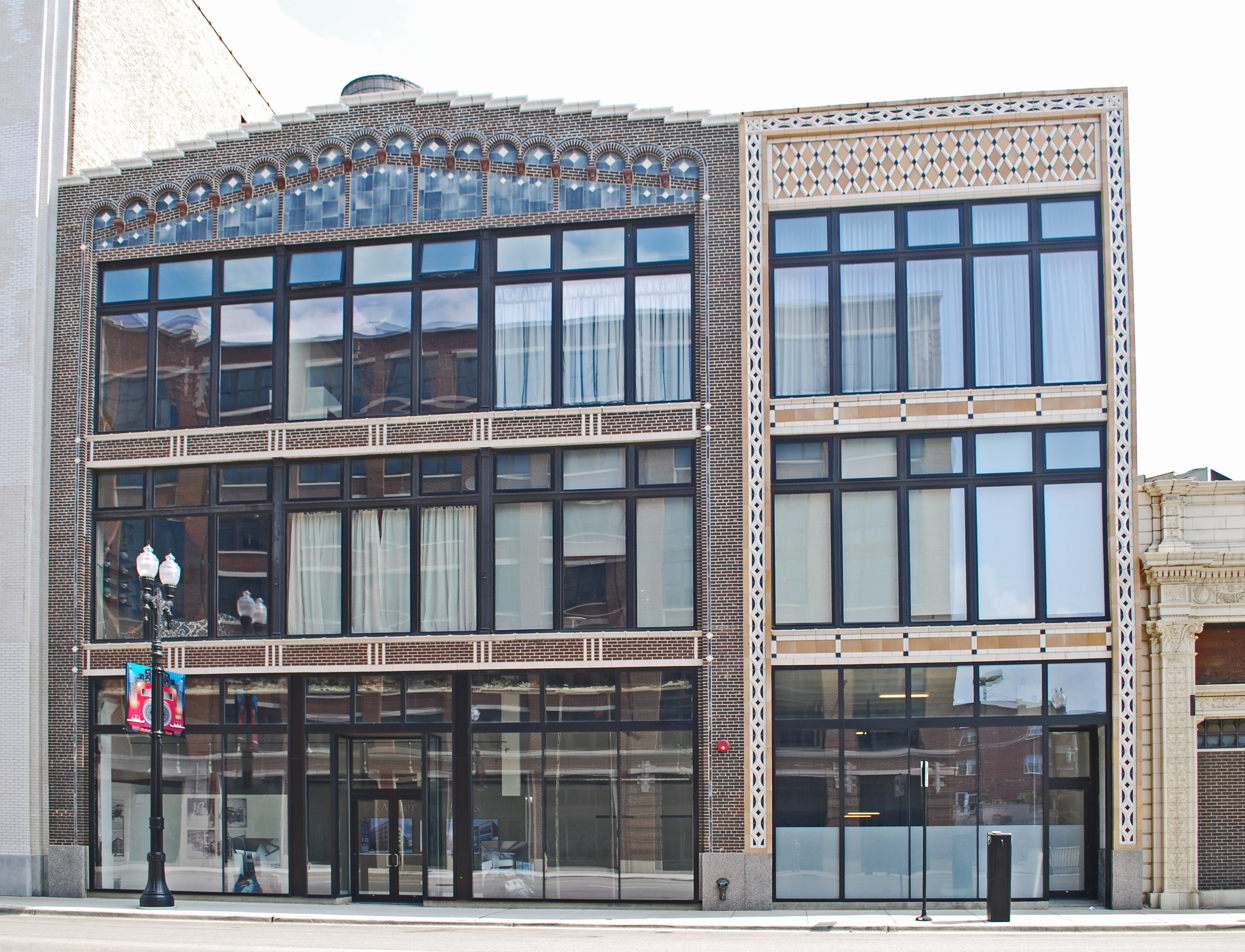
2315 S. Michigan

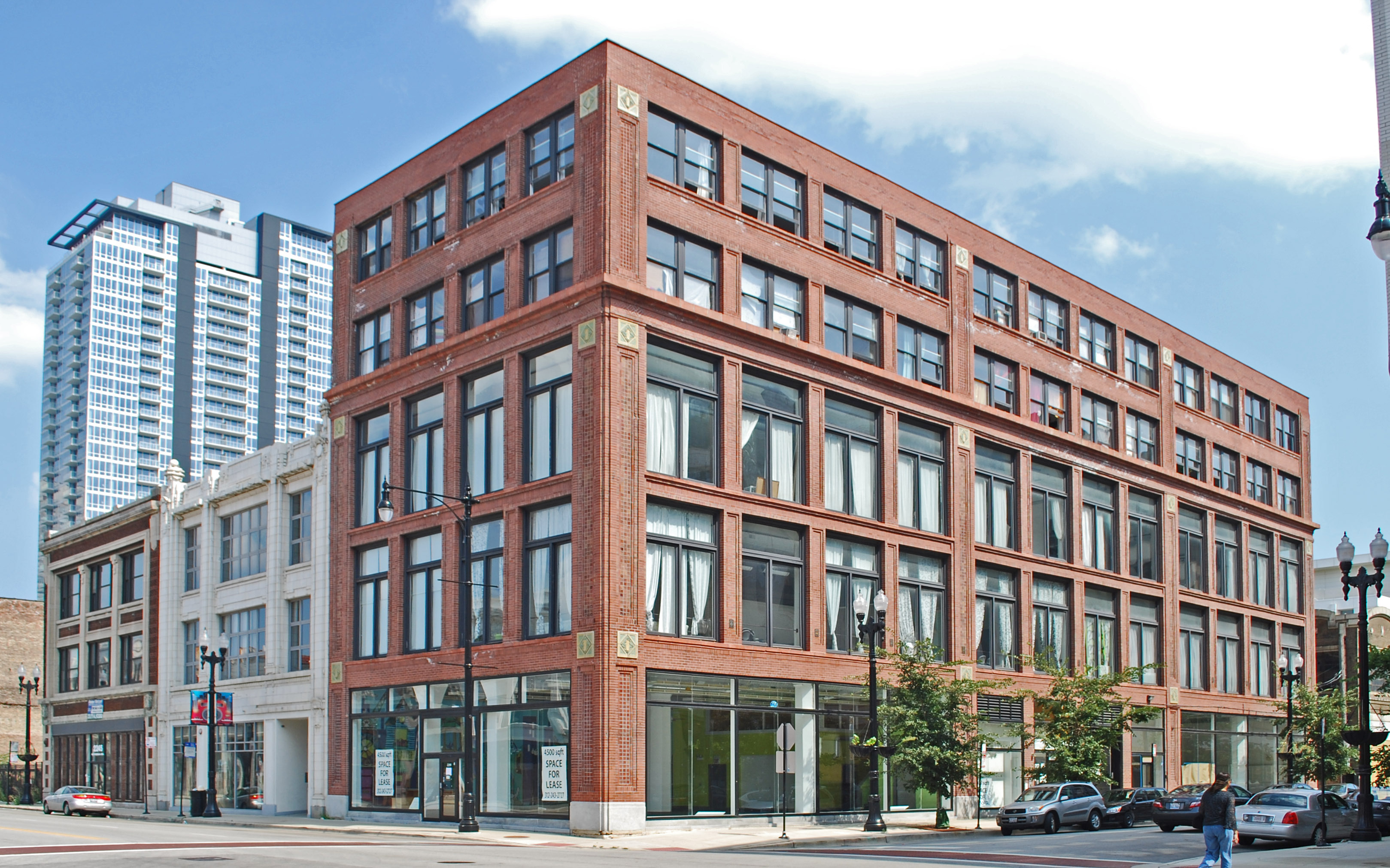
2200 block S. Michigan

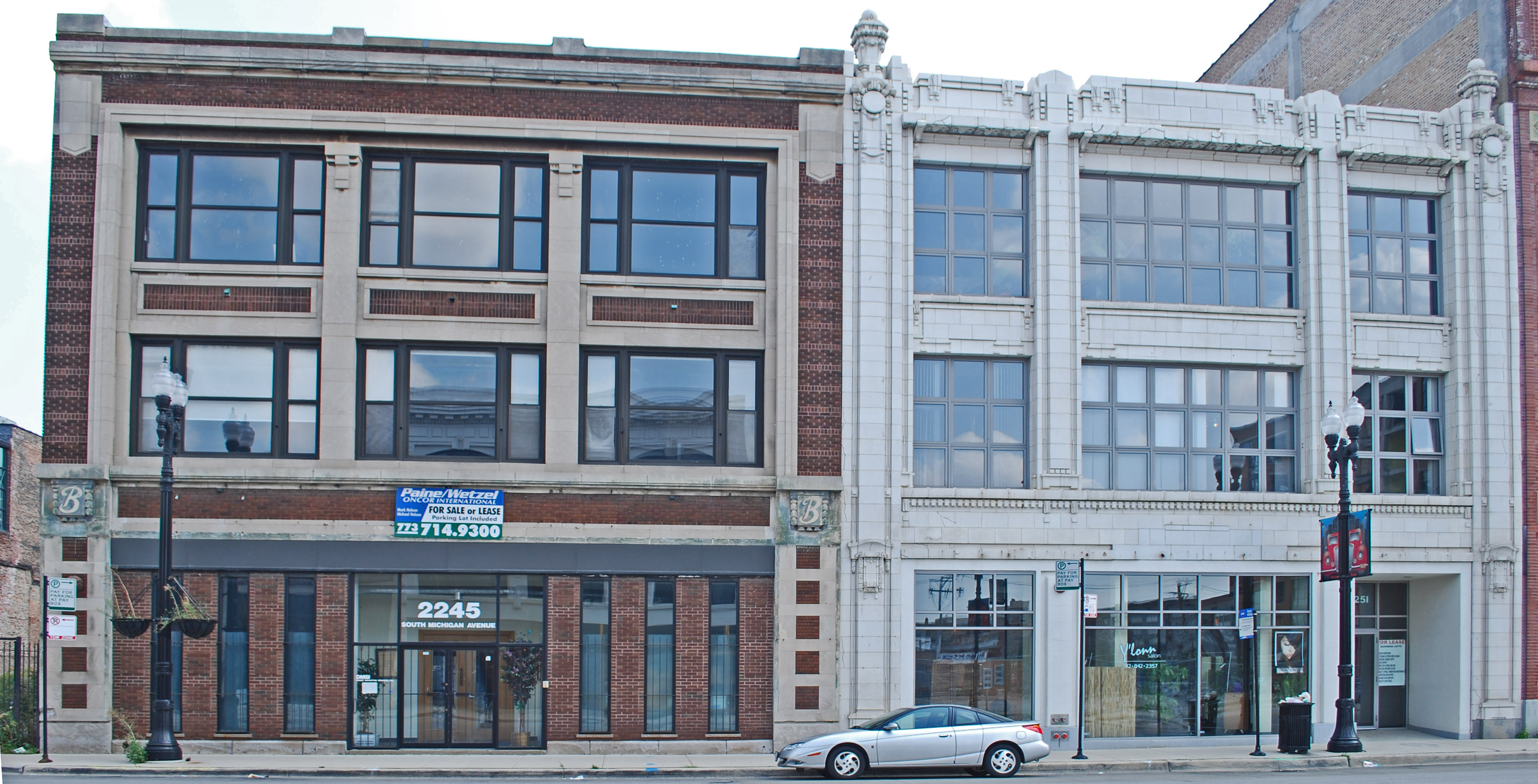
2245-2251 S. Michigan

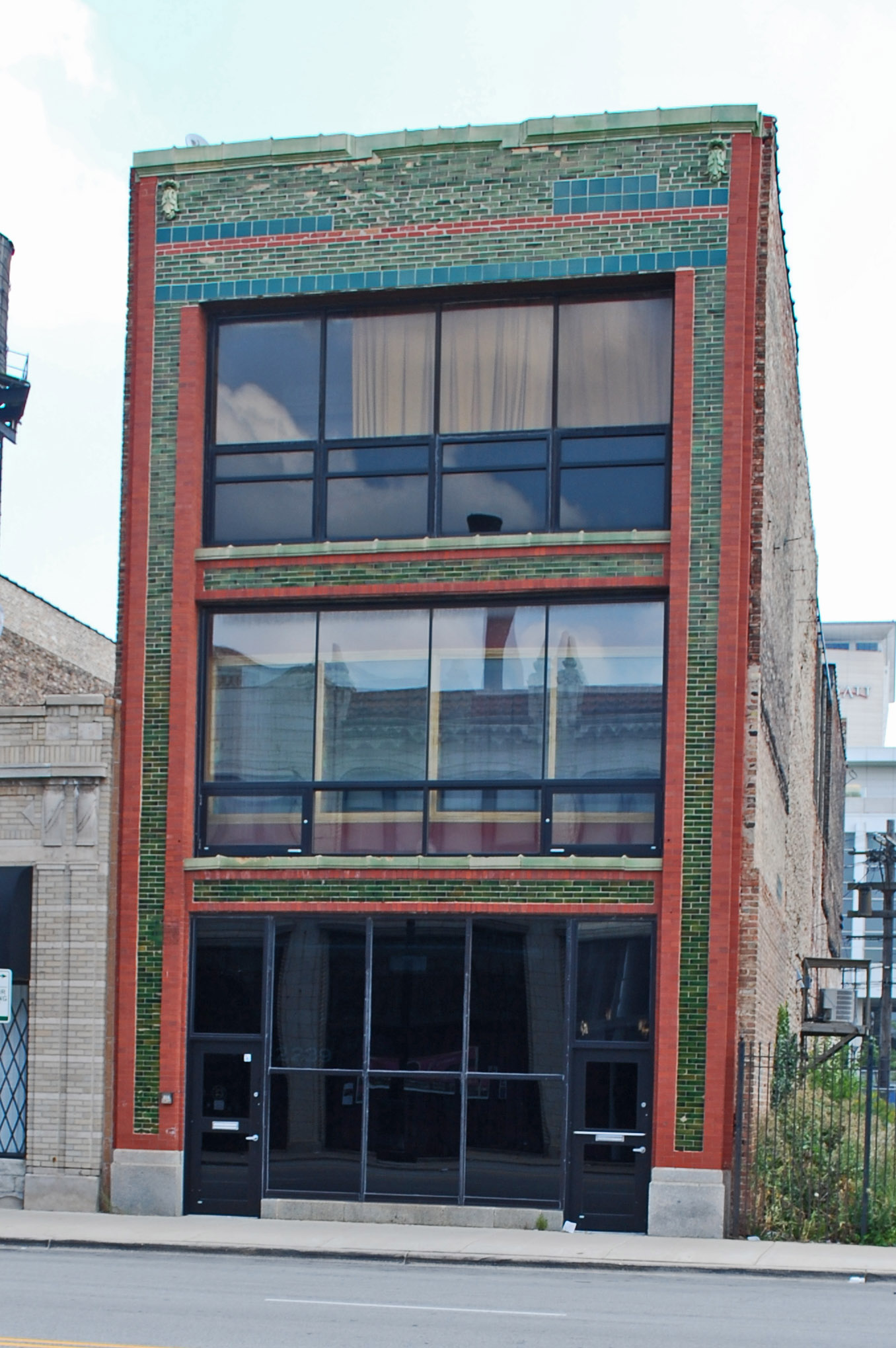
2239 S. Michigan

== See also ==
- National Register of Historic Places listings in Central Chicago
- National Register of Historic Places listings in South Side Chicago
