= Holabird =

Holabird is the name of various people and places, including:

== People ==
- William S. Holabird (c. 1794 – May 20, 1855), American lawyer, politician, and the 17th Lieutenant Governor of Connecticut.
- William Holabird (September 11, 1854 – July 19, 1923), Chicago architect.
- John Augur Holabird (May 4, 1886 – May 4, 1945), son of architect William Holabird, and a Chicago architect, as well.
- Holabird & Roche, Chicago architecture firm.
- Holabird & Root, later name of the Holabird & Roche architecture firm.
- Katharine Holabird, (born January 23, 1948), an American writer.
- Samuel B. Holabird, 17th Quartermaster General of the United States Army from July 1883 to June 1890.

== Places ==
- Holabird, South Dakota, unincorporated community in Hyde County, South Dakota, United States
- Holabird House, historic house in Canaan, Connecticut, U.S.
- Fort Holabird, U.S. Army post in the city of Baltimore, Maryland, from 1918 to 1973. Established as Camp Holabird, and renamed over time as Holabird Ordnance Depot, Holabird Signal Depot, Camp Holabird, and Fort Holabird.
- Holabird Industrial Park, a neighborhood in Baltimore
