= The Revolutionist =

1925 short story by Ernest Hemingway

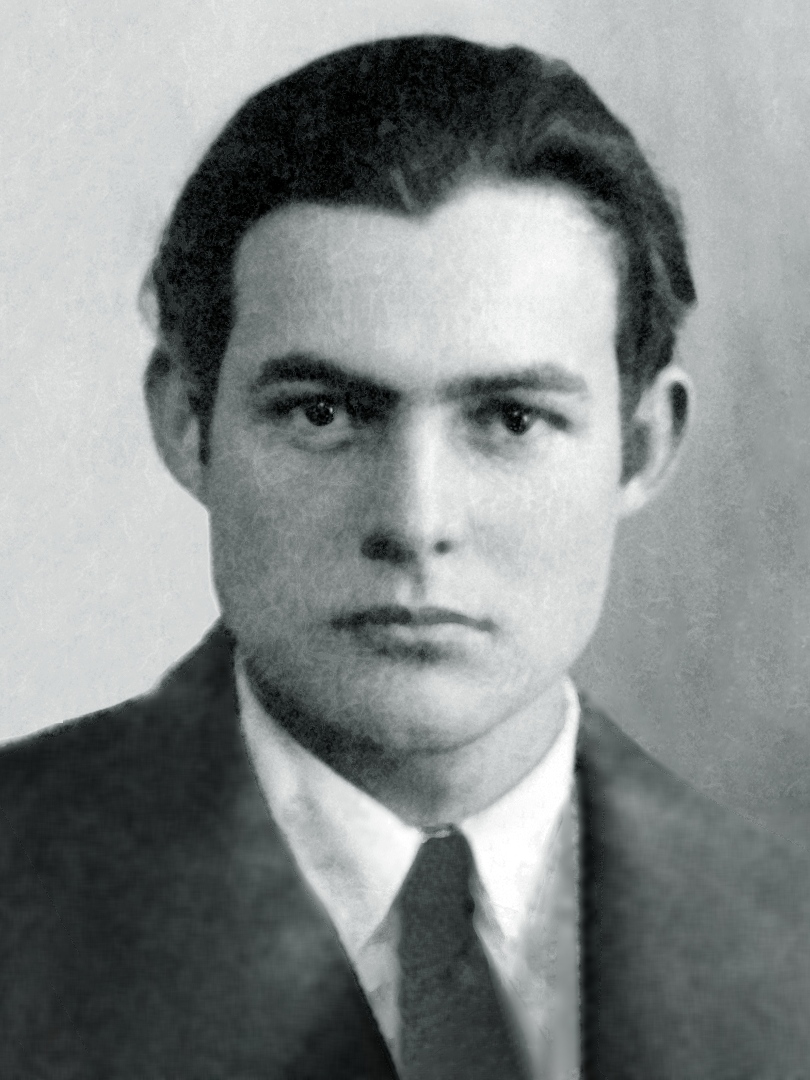
Ernest Hemingway in 1923, about a year before he wrote "The Revolutionist"

"The Revolutionist" is an Ernest Hemingway short story published in his first American volume of stories In Our Time. Originally written as a vignette for his earlier Paris edition of the collection, titled in our time, he rewrote and expanded the piece for the 1925 American edition published by Boni & Liveright. It is only one of two vignettes rewritten as short stories for the American edition.

The story is about a young Hungarian magyar communist revolutionary fleeing the Hungarian White Terror to Italy. There he visits museums, where he sees some Renaissance paintings he likes, while declaring his dislike for the painter Mantegna.

"The Revolutionist" has received scant attention from literary critics with only a cursory examination of the art mentioned in the short story. Literary critics have speculated whether Hemingway's intended meaning in his allusion to Mantegna's Dead Christ is meant to highlight the importance of realism as opposed to idealism, or whether it is a reminder of the character's pain and perhaps the pain suffered by an entire generation.

== Summary ==
In the story a Magyar communist revolutionist travels by train through Italy visiting art galleries. He admires Giotto, Masaccio, and Piero della Francesca, but not Mantegna. He buys reproductions of the pieces he likes, which he wraps and stows carefully. When he reports to a second character, who acts as the story's narrator, the two take a train to Romagna. The narrator then sends the young man on to Milan from where he is to cross to safety across the Alps into Switzerland via Aosta. The narrator provides him with addresses for contacts in Milan and tells him about the Montegnas to be seen there—which the young Communist again explains he dislikes. The story ends with the narrator saying: "The last I heard of him the Swiss had him in a jail near Sion."

== Publication history and background ==
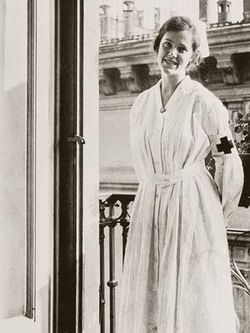
Agnes von Kurowsky in Milan, 1918

The piece was probably written in 1923 or 1924, when Hemingway lived in Paris with his first wife Hadley Richardson. A year earlier all of his manuscripts were lost when Hadley packed them in a suitcase that was stolen. Acting on Ezra Pound's advice that he had lost no more than the time it took to write the pieces, Hemingway either recreated them or wrote new vignettes and stories.

"The Revolutionist" was included as a vignette (Chapter 11) in the 1924 Paris edition of in our time published by Bill Bird's Three Mountain's Press. Of the 18 vignettes contained in the volume, only two were rewritten as short stories for the American edition, published in 1925 by Boni & Liveright. "The Revolutionist" was one; the other was "A Very Short Story".

It has autobiographical allusions to Milan. In 1918, at age 19 Hemingway recuperated for six months at a hospital in Milan after suffering a mortar hit on the Italian front. There, Hemingway met and fell in love with Red Cross nurse Agnes von Kurowsky. Although seven years his senior, Hemingway loved her deeply and the two were to marry on his return to the US at the end of his recuperation. However, after Hemingway went home, he was devastated when Kurowsky broke off the romance in a letter, telling him of her engagement to an Italian officer.

The background of "The Revolutionist" is based on the 1919 Hungarian White Terror, caused when Communist iconoclasm resulted in a bloody and violent backlash leading to a period of severe repression, from which the young Magyar revolutionist flees.

== Style and themes ==
At barely over a page long, (no more than 400 words) the piece is variously considered a vignette or a story. It lacks a plot, and seemingly does no more than capture a moment of time in the characters' lives. The piece is an early experiment in Hemingway's "theory of omission"—later to be known as the Iceberg Theory—in which nonessential information is left out or barely hinted at. The story has attracted little attention from literary critics and much of that examines the allusions to Renaissance painters. Early biographers such as Carlos Baker dismissed the piece as a miniature, or a sketch.

Hemingway was an art lover. He said that "seeing pictures" was one of five things he cared about, going on to say, "And I could remember all the pictures." Aldous Huxley caused a minor literary dispute when he made derisive remarks about Hemingway's allusion to the "bitter nail holes" of Mantegna's Dead Christ in A Farewell to Arms; Hemingway shot back by saying that the characters the writer makes must genuinely be interested in the art, clearly explaining, "A writer who appreciates the seriousness of writing so little that he is anxious to make the reader see he is formally educated, cultured and well-bred is merely a pop-in-jay."

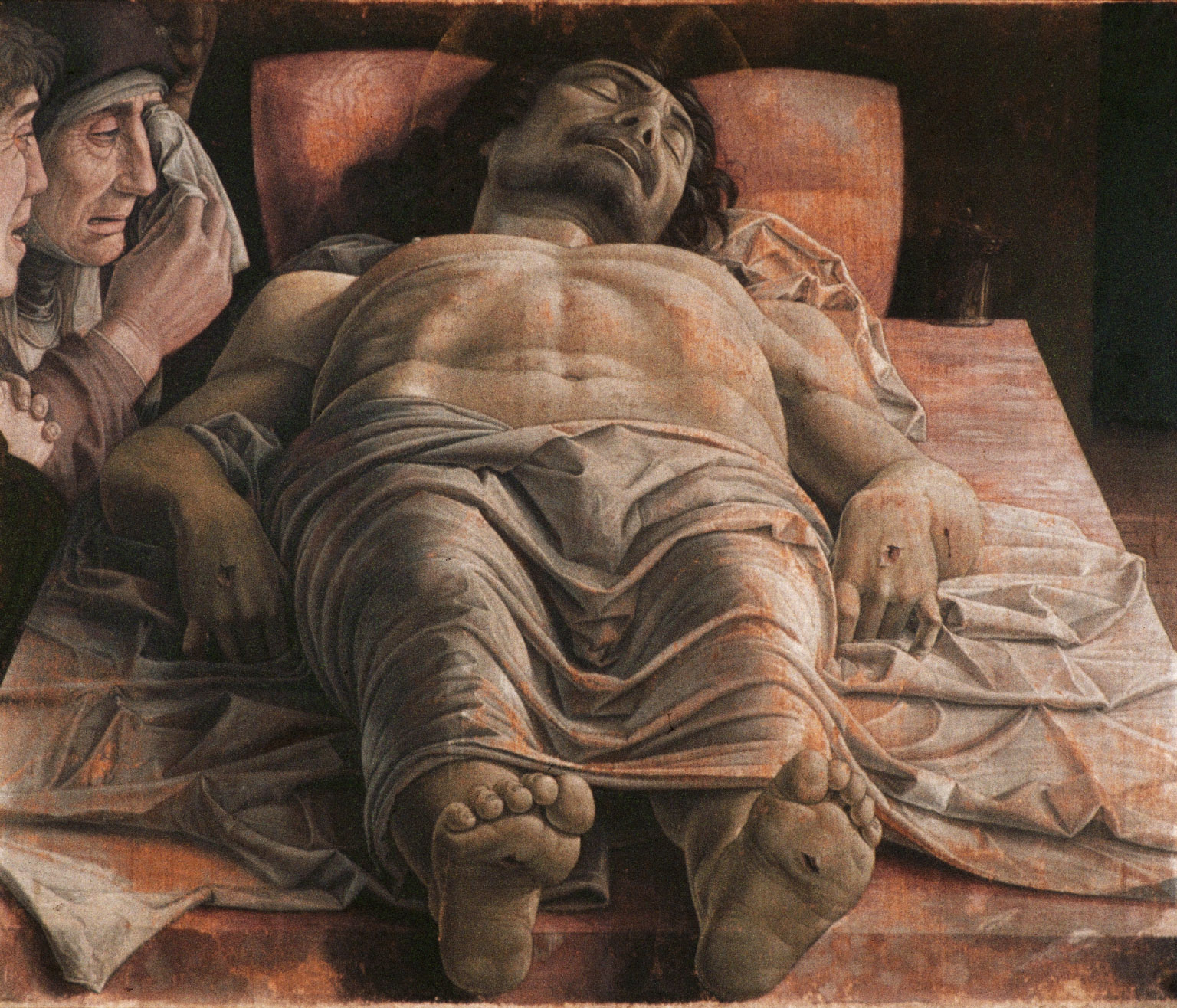
Mantegna's Dead Christ c. 1501, Brera Gallery, Milan

Of the six references to Mantegna in the entire Hemingway canon, two occur in "The Revolutionist". Mentioning Mantegna twice in such a very short story signals it is an important point; critics think Hemingway almost certainly meant Mantegna's c. 1501 Dead Christ, which deviates greatly from Giotto and Masaccio and della Francesco in its use of perspective and realism. The picture depicts Christ in death as a very human figure with a robust physiognomy in the days before resurrection and ascension. Critic Kenneth Johnston says that for a Renaissance viewer the painting would have a much different effect than for a young man of the Lost Generation "who would see ... an acute reminder that life if painful and painfully short." Hemingway was fascinated by scenes of the crucifixion, according to Johnston, seeing it symbolic of sacrifice, "the ultimate in pain, suffering and courage", writing that to Hemingway's young man in "The Revolutionist", "the bitter nail holes of Mantegna's Christ symbolize the painful price of sacrifice".

Hemingway scholar Charles Oliver speculates Mantegna's social rise from humble beginnings could be construed as offensive to the young communist's values. Critics suggest the young Magyar's dislike of the artist means he rejects Mantegna's realism while conversely the narrator embraces Mantegna and his realism. Johnston believes the young man has seen and experienced deep suffering and wishes to avoid the visual imagery of the "bitter nail holes" "for they would painfully recall the 'bad things' he and his comrades suffered in their revolutionary faith."

Critic Anthony Hunt thinks the artists and their works is unimportant to the story, and the piece shows the revolutionist as an idealistic young man more attracted to the countryside of Tuscany and less to cities such as Milan; hence Mantegna merely symbolizes a place. Johnston disagrees. He believes the young man is a Hemingway archetype, a character whose idealism has been shattered, who has experienced the horrors of war, and who copes by ignoring or avoiding images and situations that remind him of his past. He has entered a state of "non-thinking". Hunt finds it significant that the young man keeps the reproductions of artists rejected by the Communist party well-wrapped in Avanti!, the Italian socialist newspaper.

Hunt, furthermore, points out Milan is significant because in that city, where he was hospitalized after his wounding, Hemingway experienced his first romantic disappointment from Agnes von Kurowsky.

== Sources ==
- Hemingway, Ernest (1925). In Our Time. New York: Scribner. ISBN 0-684-82276-8
- Mellow, James (1992). Hemingway: A Life Without Consequences. New York: Houghton Mifflin. ISBN 978-0-395-37777-2
- Meyers, Jeffrey (1985). Hemingway: A Biography. New York: Macmillan. ISBN 978-0-333-42126-0
- Oliver, Charles (1999). Ernest Hemingway A to Z: The Essential Reference to the Life and Work. New York: Checkmark Publishing. ISBN 978-0-8160-3467-3
- Sanderson, Rena (2006). Hemingway's Italy: New Perspectives. Louisiana State University Press ISBN 0-8071-3113-X
- Smith, Paul (1996). "1924: Hemingway's Luggage and the Miraculous Year". in Donaldson, Scott (ed). The Cambridge Companion to Ernest Hemingway. New York: Cambridge UP. ISBN 978-0-521-45479-7
- Tetlow, Wendolyn E. (1992). Hemingway's "In Our Time": Lyrical Dimensions. Cranbury, NJ: Associated University Presses. ISBN 0-8387-5219-5
- Waldhorn, Arthur (2002 edition). A reader ́s guide to Ernest Hemingway. Syracuse, NY: Syracuse University Press. ISBN 0815629508
