= A Farewell to Arms (disambiguation) =

A Farewell to Arms is a 1929 semi-autobiographical novel by Ernest Hemingway.

A Farewell to Arms may also refer to:

== Adaptations of the novel ==
- A Farewell to Arms (play), a 1930 stage adaptation by Laurence Stallings
- A Farewell to Arms (1932 film), a film adaptation directed by Frank Borzage starring Gary Cooper
- A Farewell to Arms (1957 film), a film adaptation directed by Charles Vidor
- A Farewell to Arms (TV series), a 1966 British TV miniseries

== Other uses ==
- "A Farewell to Arms" (poem), a 1590 poem by George Peele
- A Farewell to Arms (album), a 2010 album by the Norwegian hard rock band TNT
- A Farewell to Arms (Futurama), an episode from the TV series Futurama
- "A Farewell to Arms", the title of the final content update for Enter the Gungeon
- "A Farewell to Arms", a song by Machine Head from the 2007 album The Blackening

== See also ==
- A Farewell to Alms, the 2007 book on Malthusian economic history by Gregory Clark
