= John Wellborn Root Jr. =

American architect (1887–1963)

- Born: July 14, 1887; Chicago, Illinois, US
- Died: October 24, 1963 (aged 76); Cape Cod, Massachusetts, US
- Burial place: Graceland Cemetery
- Education: Cornell University; Beaux-Arts de Paris
- Occupation: Architect
- Father: John Wellborn Root

John Wellborn Root Jr. (July 14, 1887 – October 24, 1963) was a significant United States architect based in Chicago.

== Biography ==
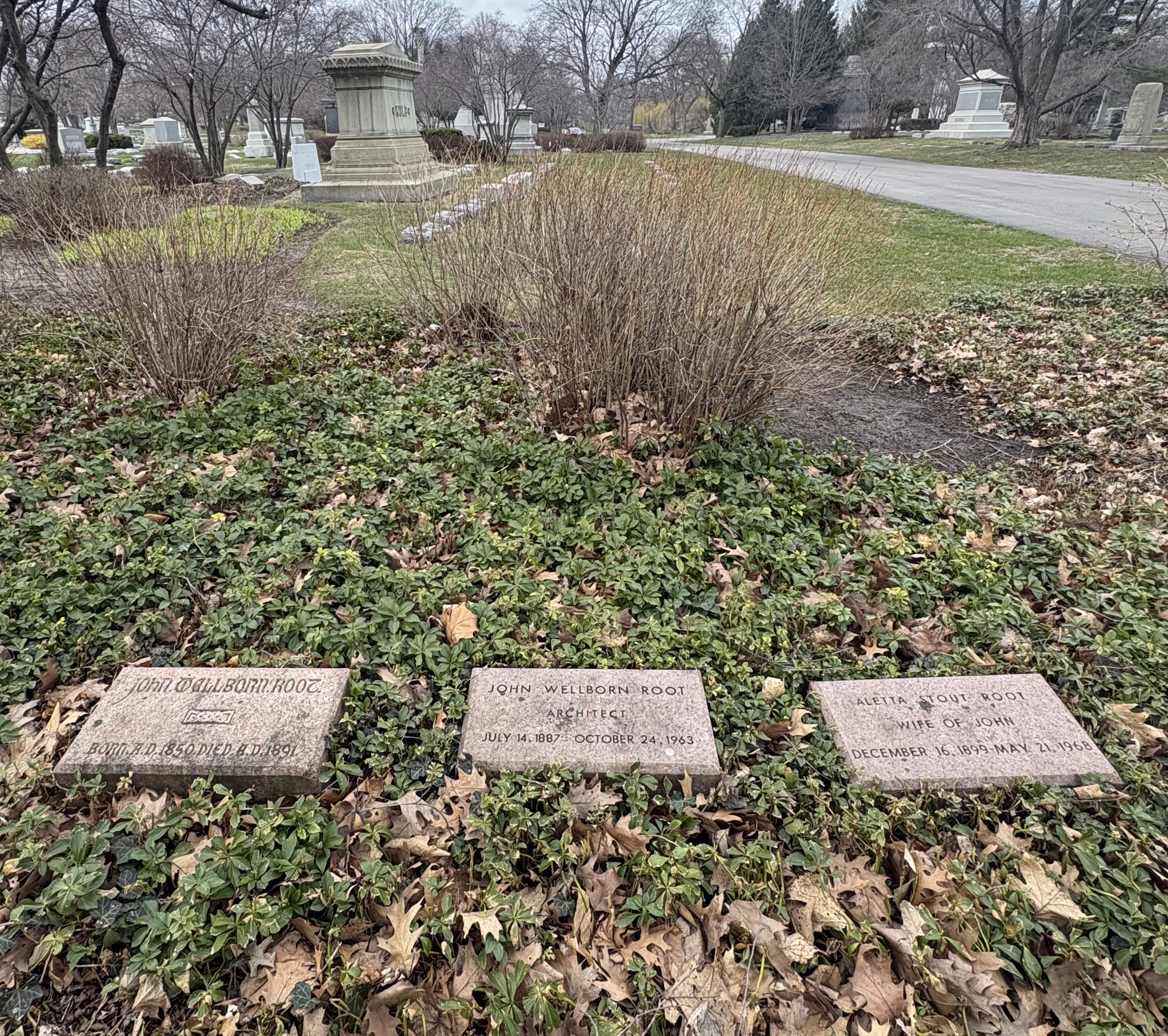
Root's grave (center) at Graceland Cemetery

John Wellborn Root Jr. was born in Chicago, the son of architect John Wellborn Root and Dora Root. As a young man, he graduated from Cornell University and studied architecture at Paris' École nationale supérieure des Beaux-Arts, where he became friends with John Augur Holabird, the son of another famous Chicago architect. Root returned to the States and joined his friend on the architectural staff at Holabird & Roche in 1919.

After the deaths of William Holabird in 1923 and Martin Roche in 1927, the firm was reorganized under the new partnership of Holabird & Root. They worked on many dazzling projects in the late 1920s and early 1930s, before the Great Depression slowed new construction. These years are notable for the firm's many impressive Art Deco buildings.

The firm weathered the Depression and Root remained an active partner into old age.

He died in Cape Cod on October 24, 1963, and was buried at Graceland Cemetery in Chicago.

== Significant buildings ==
- Palmolive Building, 1929
- 333 North Michigan Building, 1928
- Chicago Board of Trade Building, 1930
- Chicago Daily News Building, 1929
- Chrysler Building at the Century of Progress 1933-34 World's Fair
- North Dakota State Capitol, 1934
- Northern Hotel, Billings, reference Billings Gazette, July 7, 1942
