= Samuel B. Holabird =

US Army quartermaster general (1826–1907)

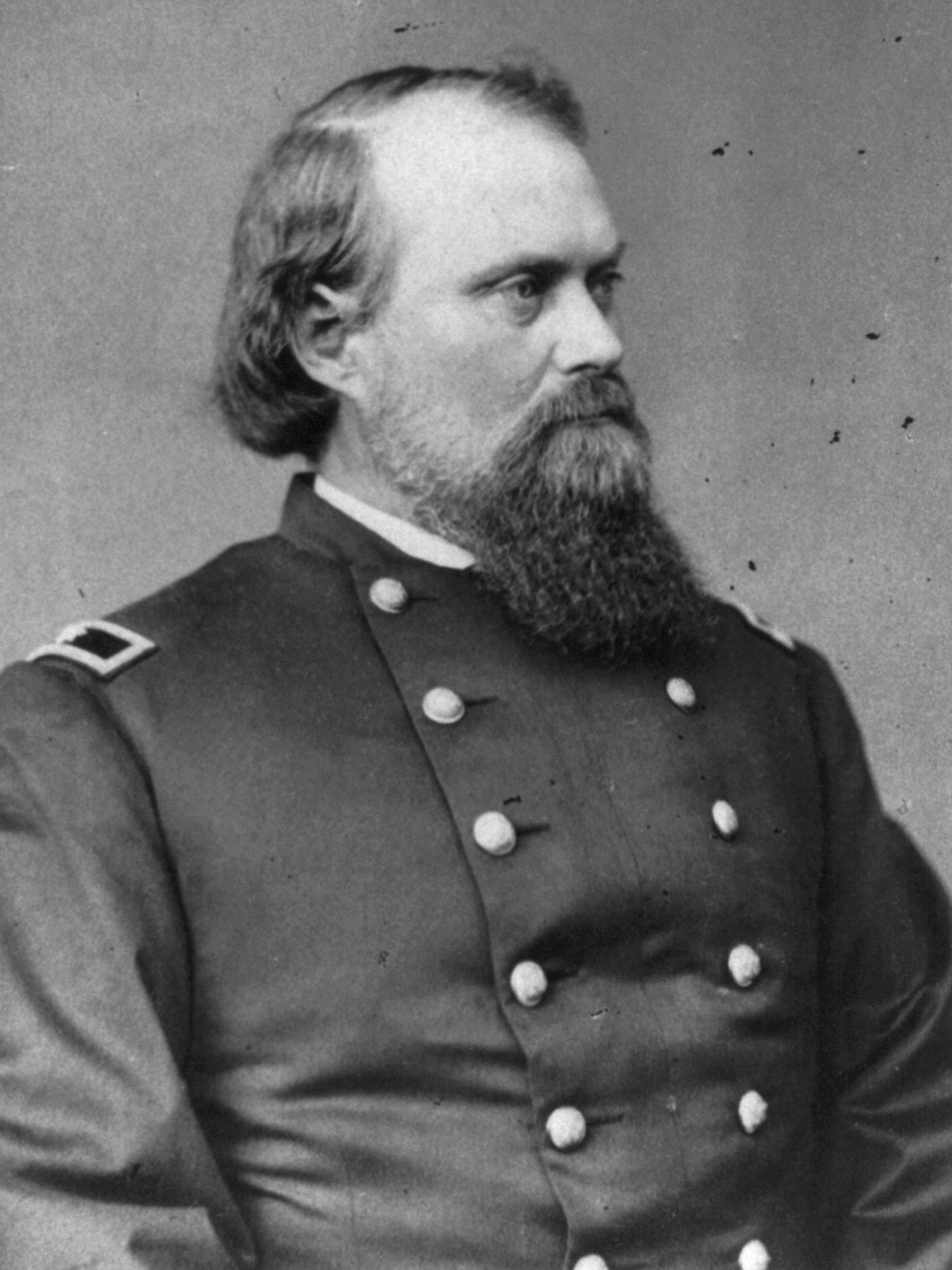
- Born: June 16, 1826; Canaan, Connecticut, US
- Died: February 3, 1907 (aged 80); Washington D.C., US
- Burial place: United States Soldiers' and Airmen's Home National Cemetery
- Spouse: Mary Theodosia Grant
- Children: 3 (including William)
- Relatives: Agnes von Kurowsky (granddaughter); William Mackey Cruikshank (grandson-in-law); John Augur Holabird (grandson)
- Military career
- Allegiance: United States
- Branch: Union Army; United States Army
- Service years: 1849–1890
- Rank: Brigadier General
- Unit: U.S. Army Quartermaster Corps
- Commands: Quartermaster General of the United States Army; Philadelphia Quartermaster Depot
- Conflicts: American Civil War

Samuel Beckley Holabird (June 16, 1826 – February 3, 1907) was a career officer in the United States Army. A Union Army veteran of the American Civil War, Holabird attained the rank of brigadier general and is most notable for his service as the Army's Quartermaster General, a position he held from 1883 to 1890.

== Early life ==
Samuel B. Holabird was born in Canaan, Connecticut on June 16, 1826, the son of Horatio Nelson Holabird and Amanda Malvina (Beckley) Holabird. He was educated in Canaan and at Winsted Academy in Winchester, Connecticut and Amenia Seminary in Amenia, New York.

Holabird attended the United States Military Academy and graduated in 1849 ranked 31st in a class of 43. He received his commission as a second lieutenant (by brevet) of Infantry, and was assigned to the 1st Infantry Regiment at Fort Brown, Texas.

== Start of career ==
Holabird performed frontier and scouting duties at Fort Brown, Fort Duncan and Fort McIntosh from 1849 to 1850. He received his permanent commission as a second lieutenant on June 10, 1850.

From 1850 to 1858, Holabird performed quartermaster, frontier, and scouting duties at Ringgold Barracks, Fort Terrett, Fort Duncan, and Fort McKavett. He was promoted to first lieutenant on May 31, 1855. From 1858 to 1859, Holabird was on recruiting duty, and he served as the adjutant of the United States Military Academy from 1859 to 1861. On May 13, 1861, Holabird was promoted to captain.

== American Civil War ==
Holabird served as quartermaster of the Union Army encampment in Harrisburg, Pennsylvania from June to August, 1861. He was quartermaster of the camp in Frederick, Maryland from August, 1861 to July, 1862. He was quartermaster of the division commanded by Nathaniel P. Banks in July and August 1862, followed by assignment as the quartermaster of the Army of Virginia's II Corps. Holabird took part in the Northern Virginia campaign, then served with the Army of the Potomac during the Maryland campaign, including the Battle of Antietam on September 17, 1862.

He was chief quartermaster of the Department of the Gulf from December 1862 to July 1865, and participated in the Siege of Port Hudson, Louisiana from May 25 to July 9, 1863. Holabird became ill in Louisiana and was on sick leave from July 13, 1863, to October 1, 1865. While he recovered, Holabird translated Antoine-Henri Jomini's Treatise on Grand Military Operations from French to English, enabling the U.S. military to make use of Jomini's work. He served as depot quartermaster in New Orleans from October 1 to December 16, 1865. From October 1, 1865, to March 7, 1866, Holabird was the chief quartermaster of the Department of Louisiana.

Holabird received a brevet promotion to major to recognize his distinguished service and he was promoted to the permanent rank of major on July 2, 1862. He received a temporary promotion to colonel on July 11, 1862. At the end of the war, he received brevet promotions to lieutenant colonel, colonel, and brigadier general to recognize the superior service he displayed during the course of the war.

== Post-Civil War ==
After the war, Holabird reverted to his permanent rank of major. From March 1866 to February 1867, he was assigned to Washington, D.C. to settle the Department of the Gulf's wartime accounts and claims. On July 29, 1866, Holabird was promoted to lieutenant colonel.

From March 12, 1867, to May 1, 1872, Holabird was chief quartermaster of the Department of Dakota. He was chief quartermaster of the Department of Texas from June 6, 1872, to August 15, 1875, and the Military Division of the Missouri from November 1, 1875, to May 6, 1878.

Holabird was chief quartermaster of the Department of the Pacific and Department of California from May 1878 to October 1879. From November 11, 1879, to April 30, 1882, he served as the Army's Assistant Quartermaster General. Holabird received promotion to colonel on January 22, 1881. He commanded the army's Philadelphia Quartermaster Depot from May 1, 1882, to July 1, 1883.

== Quartermaster General ==
Holabird was promoted to brigadier general on July 1, 1883, and assigned as Quartermaster General of the United States Army. He held the post until his retirement from the army on June 16, 1890.

As Quartermaster General, Holabird oversaw the effort to resolve pending civilian claims for property lost, damaged, or appropriated by the military during the Civil War, the last of which was settled in 1889. Holabird also undertook an effort to enhance soldier facilities and living conditions, including improvements to uniforms and personal equipment, and new or refurnished barracks, mess halls, storehouses, and hospitals.

Holabird also undertook an unsuccessful initiative to professionalize the Army's Quartermaster Corps. Under the prevailing system, soldiers from the Army's basic branches, including Infantry, Cavalry, and Artillery, performed quartermaster duties on an as-needed basis. Under Holabirds's plan, the Army would have created approximately 1,300 positions for soldiers to permanently serve as quartermaster clerks, teamsters, and laborers.

== Later life, death and legacy ==
In retirement, Holabird was a resident first of Evanston, Illinois, then of Washington, DC. He died in Washington on February 3, 1907, aged 80, and was buried at the United States Soldiers' and Airmen's Home National Cemetery.

Holabird was an inventor of and experimenter with military equipment and was credited with improvements to the army's existing tents, as well as fielding an early version of the Army's campaign hat and its first canvas fatigue uniform.

The U.S. Army Transport Ship General S. B. Holabird, which was active in the years prior to and during World War I, was named for him.

Fort Holabird, a U.S. Army post in Baltimore, Maryland that operated from 1918 to 1973, was named for him.

== Family ==
In 1849, Holabird married Mary Theodosia Grant. They were the parents of three children—Agnes, Mary, and William.

Agnes Holabird, who married Paul von Kurowsky, was the mother of Agnes von Kurowsky, a Red Cross nurse who cared for Ernest Hemingway after he was wounded during World War I, and was his inspiration for the heroine in A Farewell to Arms.

William Holabird became a prominent architect based in Chicago. His daughter Cornelia was the wife of U.S. Army general William Mackey Cruikshank.

== Sources ==
=== Internet ===
- Cullum, George W. (November 5, 2013). "Class of 1849: Samuel B. Holabird". Consolidated Entries from "Cullum's Register". Bill Thayer.
- "Brigadier General Samuel B. Holabird: 17th Quartermaster General, July 1883-June 1890". old.qmfound.com. Ft. Lee, VA: U.S. Army Quartermaster Foundation. November 19, 2000.

=== Books ===
- The National Cyclopedia of American Biography. Vol. 10. New York, NY: James Terry White. 1900. p. 122 – via Google Books.
- Bruegmann, Robert (August 18, 1997). The Architects and the City: Holabird & Roche of Chicago, 1880-1918. Chicago, IL: The University of Chicago Press. ISBN 978-0-2260-7695-9 – via Google Books.
- Jones, Carlton (1987). Streetwise Baltimore: The Stories Behind Baltimore Street Names. Los Angeles, CA: Bonus Books. p. 87. ISBN 9780929387277 – via Google Books.
- McChristian, Douglas C. (2007). Uniforms, Arms, and Equipment. Vol. I: Headgear, Clothing, and Footwear. Norman, Oklahoma: University of Oklahoma Press. ISBN 978-0-8061-3789-6 – via Google Books.
- McElderry, Henry (1885). World's Industrial and Cotton Centennial Exposition, New Orleans 1884-1885: Models of Hospitals and Hospital Tents. Washington, DC: Medical Department, United States Army – via Google Books.
- Quartermaster General of the Army (1986). U.S. Army Uniforms and Equipment, 1889. LIncoln: University of Nebraska Press – via Google Books.
- Risch, Erna (1962). Quartermaster Support of the Army, a History of the Corps, 1775-1939. Washington, DC: Quartermaster Historian's Office, Office of the Quartermaster General – via Google Books.

=== Newspapers ===
- "Quartermaster-General Holabird". Army and Navy Journal. New York. August 2, 1884 – via Google Books.
- "Capt. M'Kay Reaches Key West with New Steamer". The Tampa Tribune. Tampa, FL. April 12, 1910. p. 12 – via Newspapers.com.
- Ringle, Ken (September 17, 1989). "The Woman Behind Hemingway's 'Farewell'". Washington Post. Washington, DC.

== Magazines ==
- Farrar, Mark (January–February 1996). "The Cav Hat". Armor. Fort Knox, Kentucky: US Army Armor Center – via Google Books.
- US Patent Office (July 22, 1884). "Patent 302,535, Tent, Samuel B. Holabird". Official Gazette of the United States Patent Office. Washington, DC: US Government Printing Office – via Google Books.
