= William Mackey Cruikshank =

United States Army general

William M. Cruikshank
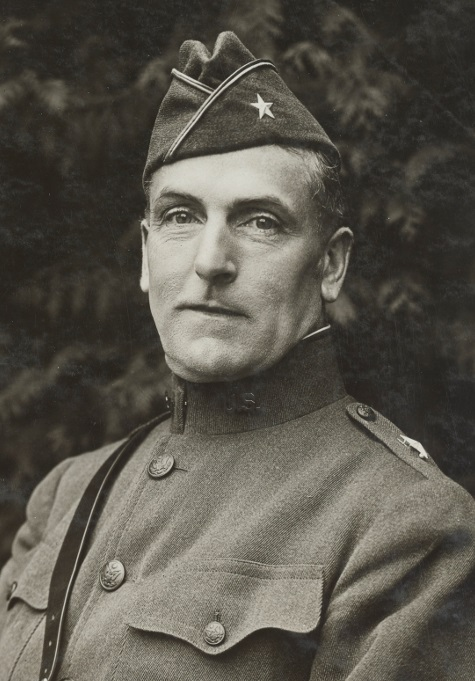
- William Cruikshank in Boucq 1918
- Born: William Mackey Cruikshank; 7 November 1870; Washington D.C.
- Died: 23 February 1943 (aged 72); Washington D.C.
- Military career
- Allegiance: United States of America
- Branch: United States Army
- Service years: 1893–1934
- Rank: Brigadier General
- Service number: 0-238
- Conflicts: Spanish–American War; World War I
- Awards: Distinguished Service Medal; Legion of Honor

William Mackey Cruikshank (7 November 1870 – 23 February 1943) was a United States army officer. He mainly served with the United States artillery and participated in military conflicts during the Spanish–American War and World War I.

== Early life and education ==
Cruikshank was born in Washington, D.C., on 7 November 1870 to John C. Cruikshank and Euphrasia Antisell. He attended the United States Military Academy at West Point, where he was a classmate of future Chief of Cavalry Herbert Ball Crosby, and graduated in 1893. Later in 1903, Cruikshank graduated from the School of Submarine Defense at Willet's Point, New York. He also graduated from the Army War College in 1920.

== Military career ==
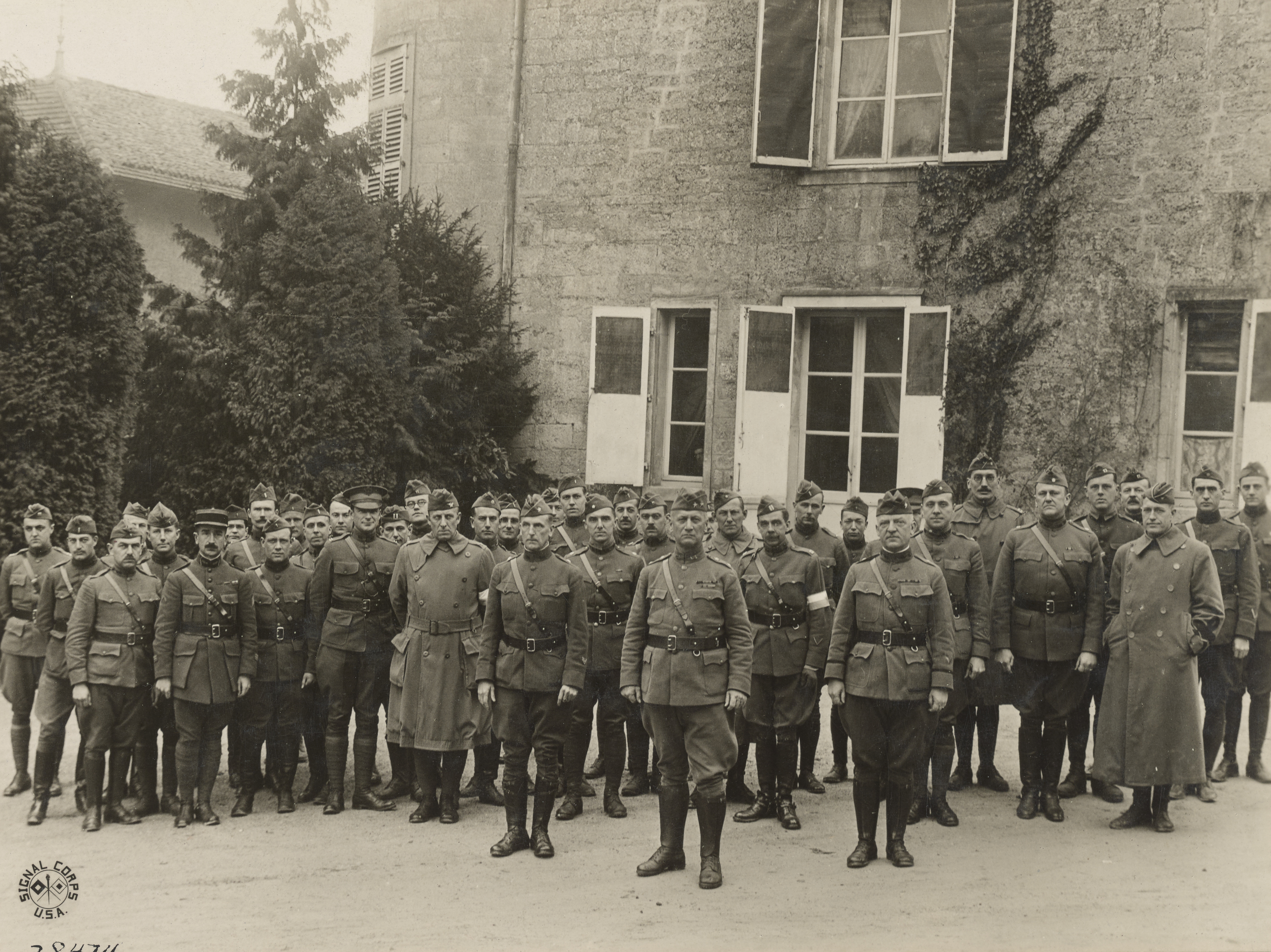
Major General Muir, the newly appointed commander of U.S. IV Corps, pictured here with his staff at Boucq, Meuse, France, October 31, 1918. Stood to Muir's right is his Chief of Artillery, Brigadier General William M. Cruikshank.

After graduating, Cruikshank was commissioned as second lieutenant in the 2nd Artillery on June 12, 1893. He taught mathematics at West Point from 1895 until 1898, when he took part in the Santiago Campaign of the Spanish–American War, after which returned to teaching from 1898 to 1899. Cruikshank was later stationed as artillery engineer at Fort Howard in Maryland from 1904 to 1907, until he went to the Philippines to serve as adjutant of the 5th Field Artillery from 1907 to 1909.

Shortly after the American entry into World War I in April 1917, Cruikshank was promoted to colonel on May 15. He arrived in France with the 1st Division, where he commanded their field artillery regiment. He served in this capacity until 1918, when he was promoted to brigadier general of the National Army. He then commanded the 3rd Field Artillery of the 3rd Division. Later that same year, Cruikshank also served with the 4th Corps of the American Expeditionary Forces as Chief of Artillery.

After the end of the war, Cruikshank remained in Europe as part of the occupation forces in Germany until 1919. For his service during the war in Europe, Cruikshank received the Distinguished Service Medal from the United States and the Legion of Honor from France. The citation for his Army DSM reads:

The President of the United States of America, authorized by Act of Congress, July 9, 1918, takes pleasure in presenting the Army Distinguished Service Medal to Brigadier General William Mackey Cruikshank, United States Army, for exceptionally meritorious and distinguished services to the Government of the United States, in a duty of great responsibility during World War I. General Cruikshank commanded with ability the Artillery of the 3d Division on the Marne during the Germany attack on 15 July 1918. Subsequently, during the advance on 18 July, due to his tactical knowledge and successful placing of the guns, he greatly assisted in the repulse of the enemy. Later he rendered valuable services as Commander of Artillery of the 4th Army Corps.

After his return to the United States, he served on the General Staff Corps from 1920 to 1924. Later Cruikshank was commandant at the Field Artillery School at Fort Sill, Oklahoma from 1930 until his retirement on 30 November 1934.

== Personal life and death ==
On April 30, 1904, Cruikshank married Cornelia Baird Holabird, the granddaughter of General Samuel B. Holabird and daughter of architect William Holabird. They were the parents of a daughter, Mary Holabird Cruikshank. He was an Episcopalian and member of the Military Order of the Loyal Legion. Cruikshank died on 23 February 1943 in Washington, D.C.
