= Martin Roche =

American architect

Martin Roche (1853–1927) was an American architect.

== Life ==
In partnership with William Holabird, Martin Roche designed buildings following the Chicago School and that were landmarks in the development of early sky scrapers. He worked for William Le Baron Jenney until 1881 when he joined William Holabird at Holabird & Simonds. One of their first commissions was Graceland Cemetery. Ossian Simonds left the practice in 1883 to concentrate on landscape design, and the firm was renamed Holabird & Roche.

Together they contributed many innovations to the Chicago School including the Chicago School windows, which allowed more sunlight into office buildings. They designed buildings including the Marquette Building, the Cable Building (1899) and the Gage Building (1899).

Roche was a fine designer with an eye for Gothic architecture. He designed the world's first Gothic-style skyscraper for the University Club of Chicago, which opened in 1908. Later, the firm designed the neoclassical Soldier Field (1924).

William Holabird died in 1923 and Martin Roche followed four years later. Holabird's son John took over the firm with John Root Jr., and it was renamed Holabird & Root.
