= Agnes von Kurowsky =

American nurse, muse for Ernest Hemingway (1892–1984)

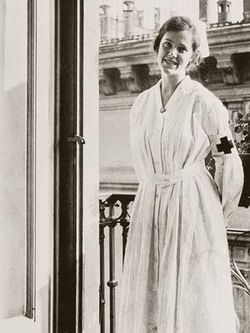
- Agnes von Kurowsky in Milan, 1918
- Born: January 5, 1892; Philadelphia, Pennsylvania, U.S.
- Died: November 25, 1984 (aged 92); Gulfport, Florida, U.S.
- Education: Bellevue Nurses Training Program
- Occupations: Nurse, librarian
- Spouse: Howard Preston Garner (m. 1928; div. 1931) William Stanfield (m. 1934)
- Medical career
- Profession: Nurse
- Institutions: American Red Cross

Agnes Hannah von Kurowsky Stanfield (January 5, 1892 – November 25, 1984) was an American nurse who inspired the character "Catherine Barkley" in Ernest Hemingway's 1929 novel A Farewell to Arms.

Kurowsky served as a nurse in an American Red Cross hospital in Milan during World War I. One of her patients was the 19-year-old Hemingway, who fell in love with her. By the time of his release and return to the United States in January 1919, Kurowsky and Hemingway planned to marry within a few months in America. However, in a letter dated March 7, 1919, she wrote to Hemingway, who was living at his parents' home in Oak Park, Illinois, that she had become engaged to an Italian officer. Kurowsky did eventually return to the United States, but she and Hemingway never met again. Hemingway's son Jack called the loss of von Kurowsky "the great tragedy" of his father's early life. Their story is shown in the 1996 film In Love and War where she is portrayed by Sandra Bullock.

Hemingway used his experiences in Italy as the basis for ten short stories. Fictionalized characters based on Kurowsky appear in his short stories "A Very Short Story" (1924) and "The Snows of Kilimanjaro" (1936), as well as his novel A Farewell to Arms.

== Early life ==
Agnes von Kurowsky Stanfield was born on January 5, 1892, in Germantown, Philadelphia, Pennsylvania. Her parents met while her German-born father Paul von Kurowsky was teaching languages at the Berlitz school in Washington, D.C., where her mother Agnes Holabird was a pupil. One of her uncles was the famous Chicago architect William Holabird, and her maternal grandfather Gen. Samuel B. Holabird, had served as Quartermaster General of the United States Army. Although her family would move many times during her childhood, Agnes came to regard Washington as her home.

== Career ==
She attended the Fairmont Seminary and a training program for the Washington Public Library, and got her first job in 1910 as a cataloger at the Carnegie-built Central Library there. In 1914 she decided to leave the library and attend nursing school. In her words, "The library was too slow and uneventful. My taste ran to something more exciting." She decided to attend the Bellevue Nurses Training Program in New York City, and graduated in 1917. She then applied for service with the American Red Cross, and, on June 15, 1918, sailed for Europe.

In Milan, at her first assignment for the Red Cross at the Army Hospital, she met Hemingway. She was seven years his senior, he only 19, but they became engaged. However, several months after he had returned to the United States, in March of 1919, she rejected him through a letter informing him that she was engaged to an Italian Royal Army officer (later disclosed as Domenico Caracciolo). After a year in New York, she was sent by the American Red Cross to the Kingdom of Romania for two years. Another two years in New York followed, before she went to Haiti. There she served as director of nurses for Haiti's Public Health Service.

== Inspiration for Hemingway ==
Agnes's identity as the basis for the fictional character "Catherine Barkley" in Ernest Hemingway's 1929 novel A Farewell to Arms was not widely known until Hemingway's brother, Leicester, published a book in 1961 about his brother. Leicester visited Agnes in Key West (where von Kurowsky had moved with William Stanfield, and worked as a librarian) while researching his book. Agnes gave him some photographs from her scrapbook that now reside at the Hemingway Foundation.

== Personal life ==
Agnes von Kurowsky was married twice, but not to the Italian officer for whom (she wrote) she broke her engagement with Hemingway. She married Howard Preston ("Pete") Garner on November 24, 1928, while stationed with the Red Cross in Haiti. After her Haitian assignment was completed, she obtained a quick divorce. She married for the second time to William Stanfield in 1934. Stanfield was a hotel manager and widower with three children.

During World War II, her husband and her stepson served in the United States Navy. Agnes and her two stepdaughters went to New York City, where she worked at the Red Cross Blood Bank on Fifth Avenue. She remained married to Stanfield until her death in Gulfport, Florida, on November 25, 1984, at the age of 92. The cause of her death was not reported; her body was buried in the United States Soldiers' and Airmen's Home National Cemetery in Washington, D.C. She was honored for "her gallant and commendable services" with the American Red Cross during World War I.

== Sources ==
- Baker, Carlos (1969). Ernest Hemingway: a Life Story, Scribners
- Bell, Millicent. "A Farewell to Arms: Pseudoautobiography and Personal Metaphor", in Ernest Hemingway, the Writer in Context, Nagel, James (ed.) (1976). Univ. of Wisc. Press
- Hemingway, Leicester (1961). My Brother, Ernest Hemingway, World Publishing Company
- Nagel, James (ed.) (1976). Ernest Hemingway, the Writer in Context, University of Wisconsin Press
- Reynolds, Michael S. (1976). Hemingway's First War, the Making of "A Farewell to Arms", Princeton University Press
- Reynolds, Michael S. (1979). The Agnes Tapes: A Farewell to Catherine Barkley, Fitzgerald/Hemingway Annual
- In Love and War, film with Sandra Bullock as Agnes von Kurowsky and Chris O'Donnell as Hemingway.
