= Boucq =

- Commune
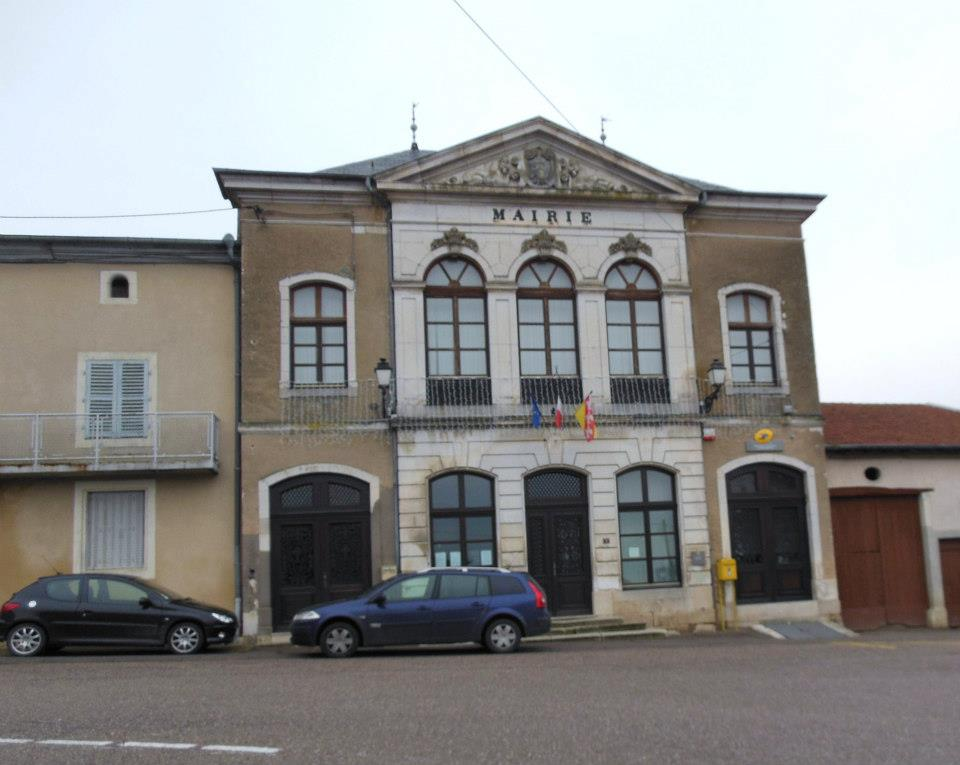
- The town hall in Boucq

- Coat of arms
- Location of Boucq
- Location within France Location within Grand Est
- Coordinates: 48°44′51″N 5°45′44″E
- Country: France
- Region: Grand Est
- Department: Meurthe-et-Moselle
- Arrondissement: Toul
- Canton: Le Nord-Toulois
- Intercommunality: Terres Touloises

Government
  - Mayor (2020–2026): Marianne Pierson
- Area^{1}: 22.66 km^{2} (8.75 sq mi)
- Highest elevation: 388 m (1,273 ft)
- Lowest elevation: 231 m (758 ft)
- Population (2023): 359
  - Density: 15.8/km^{2} (41.0/sq mi)
- Time zone: UTC+01:00 (CET)
  - Summer (DST): UTC+02:00 (CEST)
- INSEE/Postal code: 54086 /54200
- ^{1} French Land Register data, which excludes lakes, ponds, glaciers > 1 km^{2} (0.386 sq mi or 247 acres) and river estuaries.

Boucq (French pronunciation: [buk]) is a commune in the Meurthe-et-Moselle department in northeastern France.

== Population ==
Historical population
Year	Pop.	±% p.a.
1968	336	—
1975	305	−1.37%
1982	321	+0.73%
1990	330	+0.35%
1999	333	+0.10%
2007	376	+1.53%
2012	369	−0.38%
2017	356	−0.71%
2023	359	+0.14%
Source: INSEE

== See also ==
- Communes of the Meurthe-et-Moselle department
- Parc naturel régional de Lorraine
