= William Holabird =

American architect (1854–1923)

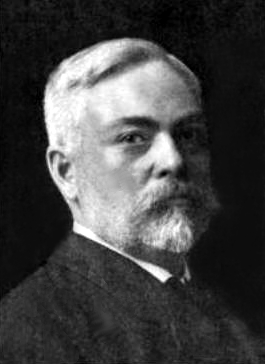
- Holabird in 1906
- Born: September 11, 1854; Amenia, New York, US
- Died: July 19, 1923 (aged 68); Evanston, Illinois, US
- Children: John Augur Holabird
- Parent: Samuel B. Holabird
- Family: Agnes von Kurowsky (niece); William Mackey Cruikshank (son-in-law)
- Occupation: Architect
- Practice: Holabird & Root
- Buildings: Marquette Building; Gage Group Buildings

William Holabird (September 11, 1854 – July 19, 1923) was an American architect.

== Biography ==
Holabird was born on September 11, 1854, in Amenia, New York, the son of General Samuel B. Holabird and Mary Theodosia Grant. He studied at the United States Military Academy at West Point but resigned and moved to Chicago, where he later got married.

He worked in the architectural practice of William Le Baron Jenney next to O. C. Simonds. Shortly after receiving the commission to extend Graceland Cemetery, Jenney passed it on to his assistants who, in 1880, established the firm of Holabird & Simonds to carry out this job. In 1881, Martin Roche, who had also worked in Jenney's office, joined them as a third partner. In 1883, the firm was renamed Holabird & Roche after Simonds left to concentrate solely on Graceland Cemetery and landscape design.

Together, they contributed many innovations to the architecture of the time, especially in what is now referred to as Chicago School. They designed several influential buildings, including the Marquette Building and the Gage Group Buildings. The latter included a façade designed by Louis Sullivan and was cited a Chicago architectural landmark in 1962.

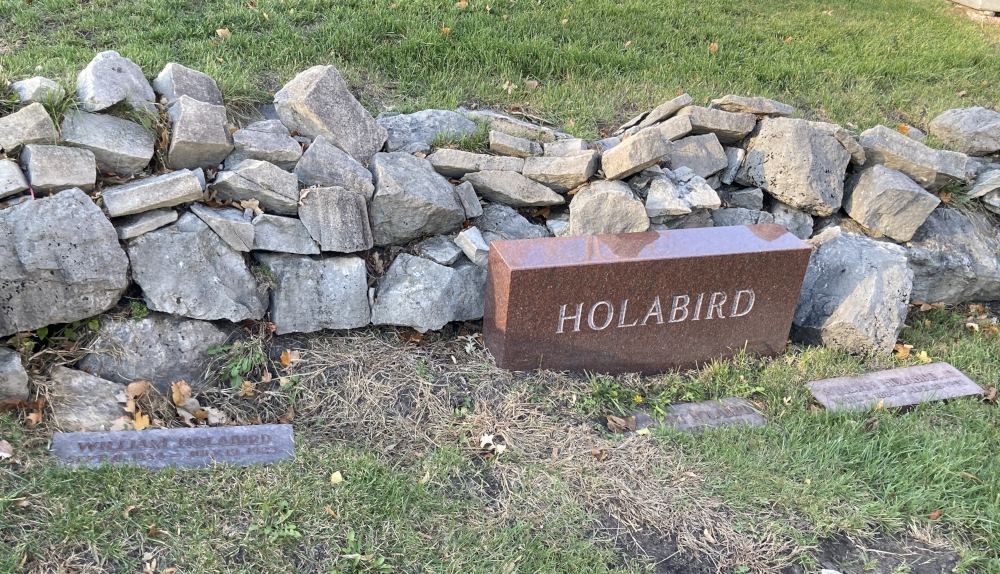
Holabird's grave

William Holabird died on July 19, 1923, aged 68, in Evanston, Illinois, and Martin Roche died in 1927. Holabird's son John took over the firm with John Wellborn Root Jr., and it was renamed Holabird & Root.

William's sister, Agnes Holabird Von Kurowsky, was the mother of Agnes von Kurowsky. His daughter Mary was the wife of General William Mackey Cruikshank.
