= A Farewell to Arms =

1929 novel by Ernest Hemingway

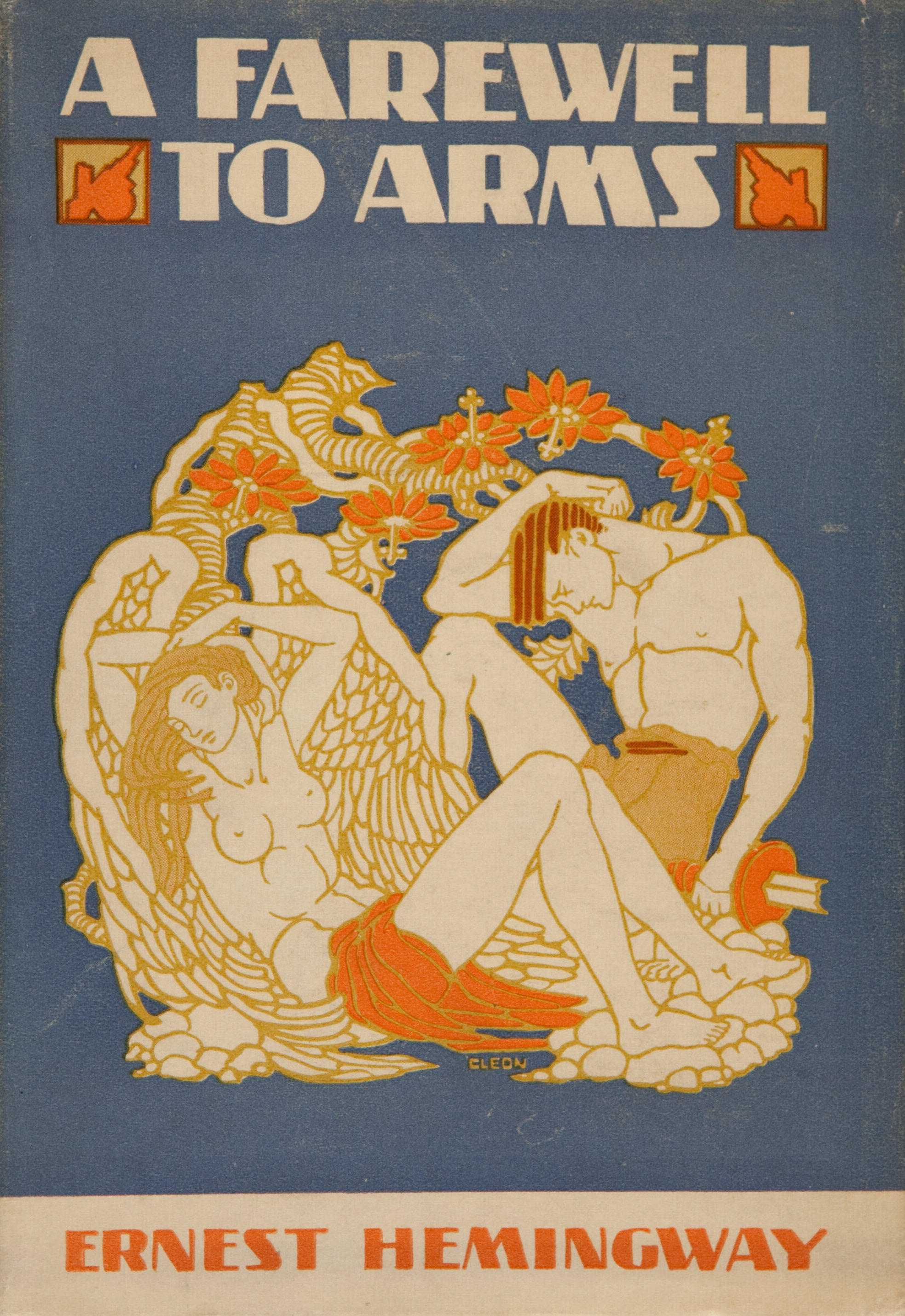
- First edition cover
- Author: Ernest Hemingway
- Cover artist: Cleo Damianakes (Cleon)
- Language: English
- Genre: Realism
- Published: September 27, 1929 (Scribner)
- Publication place: United States
- Media type: Print (hardcover)
- Pages: 355
- Text: A Farewell to Arms online

A Farewell to Arms is a novel by American writer Ernest Hemingway, set during the Italian campaign of World War I. First published in 1929, it is a first-person account of an American, Frederic Henry, serving as a lieutenant (Italian: tenente) in the ambulance corps of the Italian Army. The novel describes a love affair between the American expatriate and an English nurse, Catherine Barkley.

Its publication ensured Hemingway's place as a modern American writer of considerable stature. The book became his first best-seller and has been called "the premier American war novel from [...] World War I". The title was taken from a 16th‑century poem of the same name by the English dramatist George Peele.

The novel has been adapted a number of times: initially for the stage in 1930; as a film in 1932, and again in 1957; and as a three-part television miniseries in 1966. The film In Love and War, made in 1996, depicts Hemingway's life in Italy as an ambulance driver in events prior to his writing of A Farewell to Arms.

Since 2025, A Farewell to Arms has been in the public domain.

== Characters ==
- Lieutenant Frederic Henry: An American serving in the Italian Army as an officer directing ambulance drivers.
- Miss Catherine Barkley: A nurse and love interest of Henry.
- Lieutenant Rinaldi: An eccentric Army surgeon serving near the front lines who takes a brotherly interest in Henry.
- The priest: An army chaplain, often has discussions about God and war with Henry.
- Helen Ferguson: A friend and fellow nurse of Miss Catherine.
- Miss Van Campen: The officious superintendent of nurses at the American hospital in Milan. She and Henry immediately dislike each other.
- Miss Gage: An unconventional nurse at the American hospital in Milan who befriends Henry.
- Major Valentini: A brisk, cheerful and competent surgeon who operates on Henry's wounded knee in Milan.
- Gino: A very likeable Italian soldier whose vocal patriotism nonetheless bothers Henry.
- Bonello: An ambulance driver under Henry's command who deserts to find safety by being captured by the enemy.
- Piani: An ambulance driver who stays with Henry out of personal loyalty.
- Passini: An ambulance driver killed in the mortar attack that wounds Henry.
- Aymo: An ambulance driver killed by straggling guards of the retreat's main line.
- Emilio: A bartender in the town of Stresa who helps them flee to Switzerland.
- Count Greffi: A ninety-four-year-old nobleman, having some past acquaintance with Henry.
- Ralph Simmons and Edgar Saunders: Two journeyman opera singers studying and performing in Italy under Italian stage names.

== Plot summary ==
The novel is divided into five sections, or "books". Frederic Henry narrates the story in the first person.

=== Book One ===
Lieutenant Frederic Henry is an American medic who serves in the Italian Army and speaks Italian. The novel begins during the First World War. It is the start of winter, when a cholera epidemic kills thousands of soldiers. Frederic visits Gorizia, where he meets other army fellows and the priest. He finds there are two brothels – one for officers and the other for lower-rank soldiers. On his return, he shares his experience with his friend, Surgeon Rinaldi, who is about the same age as Frederic.

Rinaldi is fond of beautiful women. He has fallen in love with an English nurse named Catherine Barkley, though not so seriously. Rinaldi takes Frederic to a British hospital, where Frederic is introduced to, and attracted to, Catherine. She tells him about her fiancé, who was killed in battle, and also about feeling uncomfortable in the rain, as it starts to rain. Frederic tries to kiss her, but she refuses and slaps him. She regrets doing so and eventually warms to him and they kiss.

Frederic and his fellow drivers (Passini, Manera, Gordini and Gavuzzi) take the ambulance toward the front line. Passini is killed in a mortar attack. Frederic is severely wounded in the knee on the Italian front and is sent to the hospital.

=== Book Two ===
Surgeon Rinaldi visits Frederic in the hospital and praises him for his heroism, but Frederic denies any display of such. Rinaldi also tells him that he will be shifted to a hospital in Milan soon for a better treatment. Frederic requests him to have Catherine there as a nurse. The priest pays a visit. In a discussion again, Frederic expresses his views against war. Meanwhile, America has declared war on Germany, and the Italian army is also anxious about war against Austria. Frederic reaches an American hospital in Milan. There he is nursed by Miss Gage, Mrs. Walker and their Superintendent Miss Van Campen. Miss Gage arranges wine for him. Catherine arrives there, and Frederic realizes a strong sense of love and passion for her. They have sex for the first time. Doctor Valentini comes to examine his injury and X-rays. This book portrays the growth of Frederic's relationship with Catherine over the summer. They enjoy boating and horse races. Meanwhile, Frederic meets Helen Ferguson, a fellow nurse of Catherine. After his knee heals, Frederic is diagnosed with jaundice. A three-week convalescent leave is sanctioned for him. Miss Van Campen discovers empty liquor bottles in Frederic's room and takes alcoholism as the cause for his condition. She also concludes that Frederic is knowingly keeping himself ill to avoid the war front. She files a report for the cancellation of convalescent leave, and Frederic is called back to the war front. Catherine informs him that she is three months pregnant. They promise to reunite and marry after his return from war. Frederic asks her to take care of "Little Catherine".

=== Book Three ===
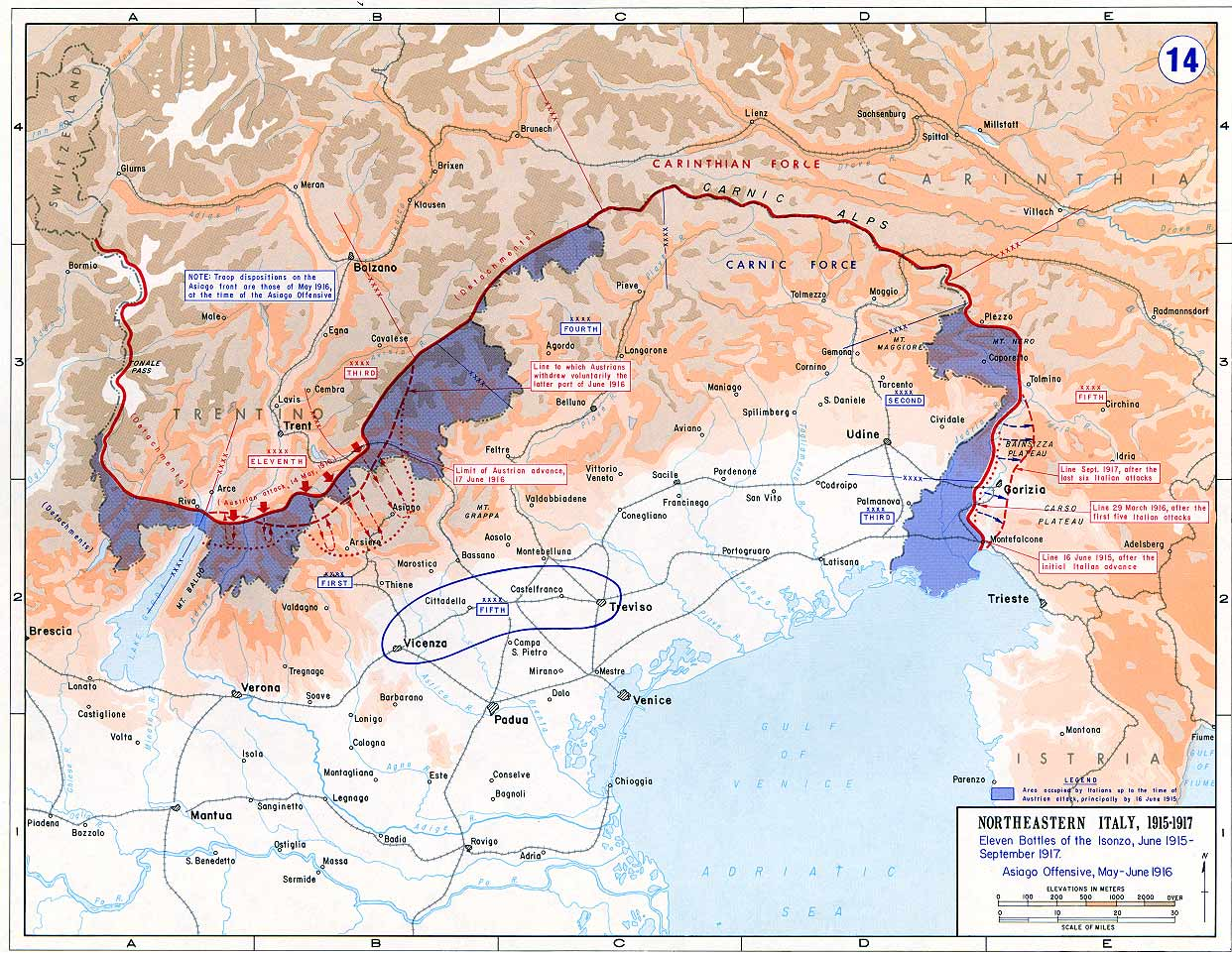
The Italian front in 1915–1917; the novel is mainly set in the eastern part of the map, where the battles of the Isonzo took place.

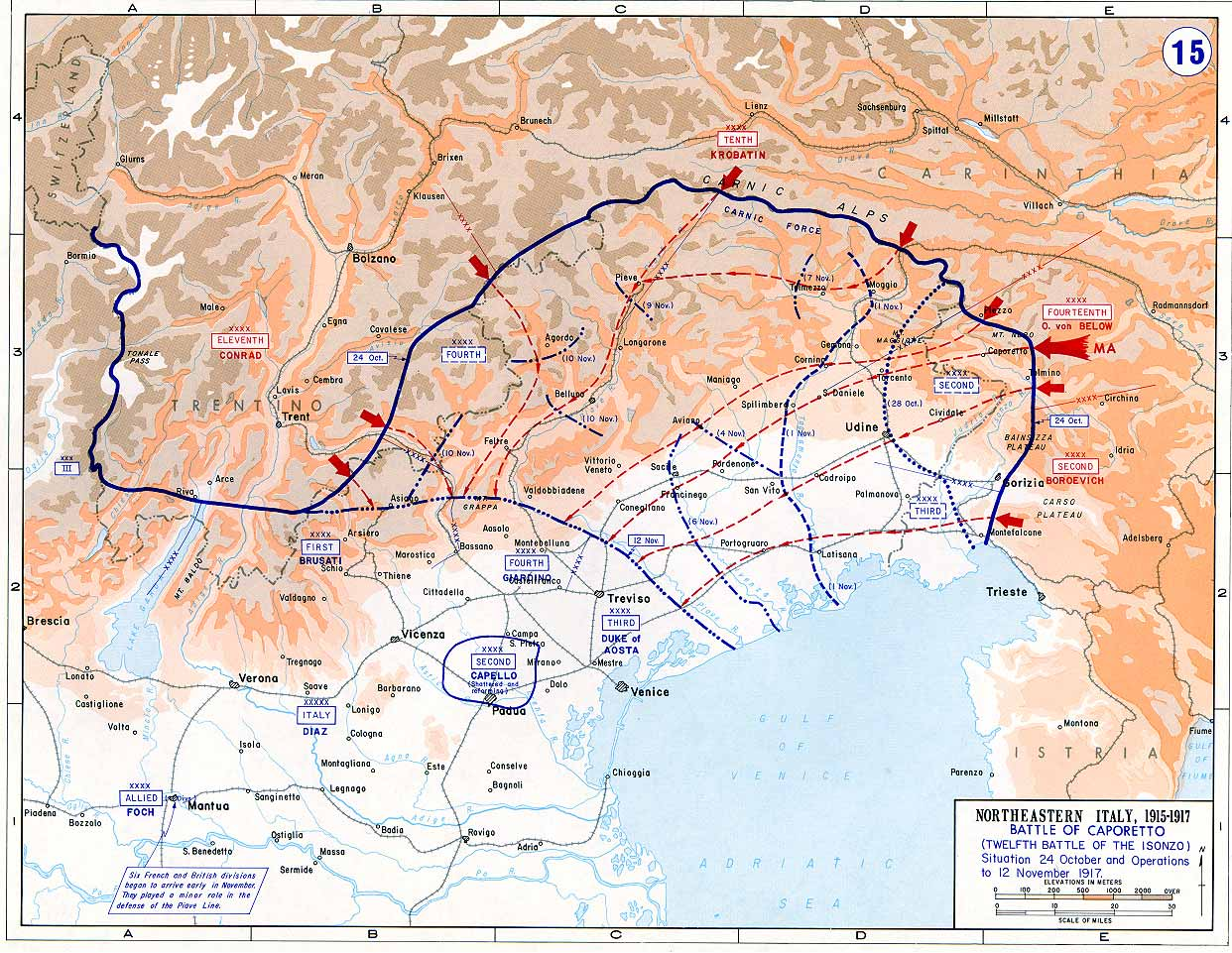
The Italian retreat after the battle of Caporetto in late 1917

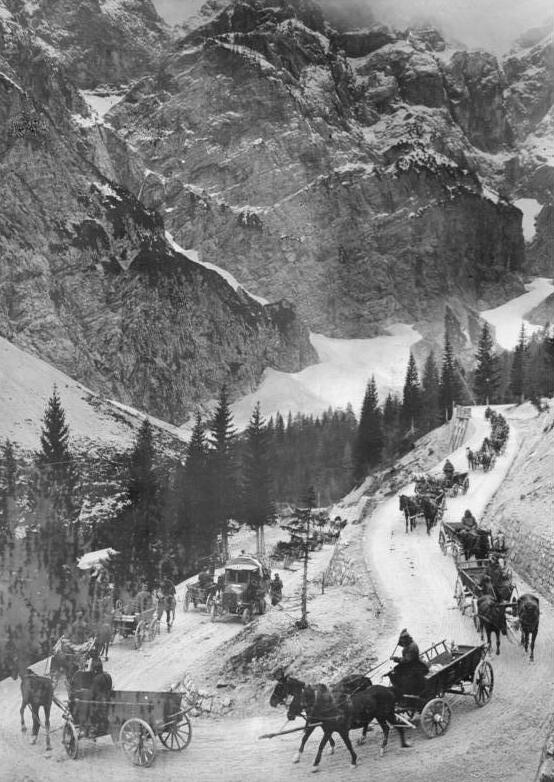
Troops crossing the Vršič Pass, October 1917

Frederic returns to Gorizia. Rinaldi comes and examines his wounded leg. He further asks whether they have married or not. The priest notices a change in Frederic and also predicts that the war will end soon. Frederic travels to Bainsizza, where he meets Gino, who tells him about an artillery battery of terrifying guns that the Austrians have. Frederic realizes that Italians will not escape if the Austrians attack. It rains heavily, and the bombarding begins. Frederic discovers that morale has severely dropped. Not long afterwards, the Austro-Hungarians break through the Italian lines in the Battle of Caporetto, and the Italians retreat. The houses are evacuated. Women and children are loaded in trucks. At the villa, Frederic discovers that Rinaldi has taken off for the hospital; everyone else has evacuated too. There is considerable delay and chaos on the road during the retreat, and Frederic, wishing to avoid a possible aerial attack while stuck on the main retreat route, decides to take an alternate path. He and his men quickly get lost, and their cars are stuck in the mud, Frederic orders the two engineering sergeants riding with Bonello to help. Afraid of being overtaken by the enemy, they refuse and try to leave. Frederic draws his gun and shoots one of them; the other escapes. One of the drivers, Aymo, is later killed, while another, Bonello, runs away to surrender to the Austrians. Frederic and his last companion, Piani, catch up to the main retreat across the Tagliamento river. As soon as they cross the bridge, Frederic is taken by the military police to a place on the river bank where officers are being interrogated and executed for the "treachery" that supposedly led to the Italian defeat. Frederic escapes by jumping into the river. Afterwards, he walks through the plains and jumps aboard a moving train to Milan to find Catherine.

=== Book Four ===
Reaching Milan, he learns that Catherine has left for Stresa. He goes to visit Ralph Simmons, one of the opera singers that he encountered earlier, and asks about the procedures for traveling to Switzerland. Ralph helps him, giving him civilian clothes. Frederic feels very odd in those clothes, as the people look at him scornfully. He reaches Stresa by train and goes to the Grand Hotel des Iles Borromées. Emilio, a bartender, informs him that two English nurses are staying at a small hotel near the train station. Frederic meets Catherine and Helen Ferguson there. He also meets Count Greffi, a very old nobleman whom Frederic had met on his last visit to Stresa. Greffi is staying with his niece. Frederic avoids Catherine's question about the war experiences. He feels that he is a criminal, a war deserter. Emilio informs him that Italian police are looking to arrest him. Catherine and Frederic plan to flee to Switzerland as Emilio makes all possible arrangements for their travel in a rowboat. Because of a storm, the waters are choppy and rough. Frederic rows the boat all night, and Catherine also takes a turn rowing. Finally, they reach Switzerland. The guards verify their identity and provide them provisional visas for staying in Switzerland.

=== Book Five ===
Frederic and Catherine live a quiet life in the mountains. They move to a wooden house on a mountain outside the village of Montreux. They develop new acquaintance with Mr. and Mrs. Guttingen. At times, Catherine starts getting concerned about their child, especially about its health. They move to the town of Lausanne to be closer to the hospital. Later, Catherine goes into labor and is taken to the hospital. The doctor tells Frederic that the best solution would be a caesarean operation. She suffers a lot of pain and finally delivers a stillborn baby boy. Later the nurse tells him that Catherine is hemorrhaging. He is terrified. He goes to see her, and she dies with him by her side. He leaves the hospital and walks back to his hotel in the rain.

== Background and publication history ==
The novel was partly based on Hemingway's own experiences serving in the Italian campaigns during the First World War. The inspiration for Catherine Barkley was Agnes von Kurowsky, a nurse who cared for Hemingway in a hospital in Milan after he had been wounded. He had planned to marry her, but she spurned his love when he returned to America. Kitty Cannell, a Paris-based fashion correspondent, became Helen Ferguson. The unnamed priest was based on Don Giuseppe Bianchi, the priest of the 69th and 70th regiments of the Brigata Ancona. Although the sources for Rinaldi are unknown, the character had already appeared in In Our Time.

Much of the plot was written in correspondence with Frederic J. Agate. Agate, Hemingway's friend, had a collection of letters to his wife from his time in Italy, which were later used as inspiration.

Michael Reynolds, however, writes that Hemingway was not involved in the battles described. Because his previous novel, The Sun Also Rises, had been written as a roman à clef, readers assumed A Farewell to Arms to be autobiographical. A Farewell to Arms was begun during his time at Willis M. Spear's guest ranch in Wyoming's Bighorns. Some pieces of the novel were written in Piggott, Arkansas, at the home of his then-wife Pauline Pfeiffer, and in Mission Hills, Kansas, while she was awaiting delivery of their baby. Pauline underwent a caesarean section as Hemingway was writing the scene about Catherine Barkley's childbirth.

Hemingway struggled with the ending. By his count, he wrote 39 versions of it "before [he] was satisfied". However, a 2012 edition of the book included no fewer than 47 alternate endings.

The novel was first serialized in Scribner's Magazine in the May 1929 to October 1929 issues. The book was published on September 27, 1929, with a first edition print-run of approximately 31,000 copies. The success of A Farewell to Arms made Hemingway financially independent.

The Hemingway Library Edition was released in July 2012, with a dust jacket facsimile of the first edition. The newly published edition presents an appendix with the many alternate endings Hemingway wrote for the novel in addition to pieces from early draft manuscripts.

The John F. Kennedy Presidential Library and Museum Hemingway collection has two handwritten pages with possible titles for the book. Most of the titles come from The Oxford Book of English Verse. One of the possible titles Hemingway considered was In Another Country and Besides. This comes from The Jew of Malta by Christopher Marlowe. The poem Portrait of a Lady by T. S. Eliot also starts off by quoting this Marlowe work: "Thou hast committed / Fornication: but that was in another country, / And besides, the wench is dead." Hemingway's library included both works by Eliot and Marlowe.

=== Censorship ===
When A Farewell to Arms was first serialized, certain words were censored and parts of the story were excised for brevity. While the 1929 novel publication restored the previously removed passages, the adult language remained censored. There are at least two copies of the first edition into which Hemingway had re-inserted the censored text by hand to provide a corrected text. One of these copies was presented to Maurice Coindreau, the other to James Joyce. Hemingway's corrected text was finally inserted into a 2025 edition of the novel, and there are some audiobook versions that are uncensored.

A Farewell to Arms was banned in the Irish Free State.

Also, the novel could not be published in Italy until 1948 because the Fascist regime considered it detrimental to the honor of the Armed Forces, both in its description of the Battle of Caporetto and because of a certain anti-militarism implied in the work. More than one biographer has suggested that, at the base of the censorship of the Fascist regime in the novel, there had also been a personal antipathy between the writer and Benito Mussolini. Hemingway had interviewed him in 1923, shortly after he had seized power, and in Hemingway's article in the Toronto Star he poured scorn on Mussolini, calling him "the biggest bluff in Europe". But, apart from the official reactions, it is known that Mussolini did not like the article at all: Hemingway described Mussolini as trying to impress the media by pretending to be deeply absorbed in reading, while in reality he was holding a French–English dictionary upside down. The Italian translation had in fact already been prepared illegally in 1943 by Fernanda Pivano, leading to her arrest in Turin.

== Critical reception ==
A Farewell to Arms was met with favorable criticism and is considered one of Hemingway's best literary works.

Gore Vidal wrote of the text: "... a work of ambition, in which can be seen the beginning of the careful, artful, immaculate idiocy of tone that since has marked ... [Hemingway's] prose". The last line of the 1929 New York Times review reads: "It is a moving and beautiful book."

Baker remarks on the theme of A Farewell to Arms: "After ten years of meditation and digestive of his experience, Hemingway lays before his readers a work which is far from a mere war experience, nor a story of love and death during the war."

However, since publication, A Farewell to Arms has also been the target of various controversies. Upon its flimsy publication—due to the medium of its release—through Scribner's Magazine, it was banned from Boston newsstands due to accusations of a pornographic nature, despite Hemingway's deliberate exclusion of graphic descriptions of sex, using omission as a literary device.

== In other media ==
The novel was first adapted for the stage by Laurence Stallings in 1930, then as a film in 1932, with a 1957 remake. A three-part television miniseries was made in 1966. In December 2023, a new film adaptation was announced, with Michael Winterbottom to direct and Tom Blyth to star.

The 1996 film In Love and War, directed by Richard Attenborough and starring Chris O'Donnell and Sandra Bullock, depicts Hemingway's life in Italy as an ambulance driver in the events prior to his writing of A Farewell to Arms.

A radio broadcast adaptation was produced in 1937 as part of the Lux Radio Theater series, starring Clark Gable and Josephine Hutchinson. In 2011, BBC Radio 4 produced a 10-episode adaptation for their 15 Minute Drama series.

In season 19, episode 6 of Family Guy, "Meg's Wedding", Peter Griffin is informed of his current physical condition by Dr. Hartman, who lifts up a large copy of A Farewell to Arms in reference to Peter's loss of both arms.

== General sources ==
- Baker, Carlos (1972). Hemingway: The Writer as Artist. Princeton: Princeton UP. ISBN 978-0-691-01305-3.
- Mellow, James (1992). Hemingway: A Life Without Consequences. Boston: Houghton Mifflin. ISBN 0-395-37777-3.
- Meyers, Jeffrey (1985). Hemingway: A Biography. New York: Macmillan. ISBN 978-0-333-42126-0.
- Oliver, Charles (1999). Ernest Hemingway A to Z: The Essential Reference to the Life and Work. New York: Checkmark Publishing. ISBN 978-0-8160-3467-3.
- Reynolds, Michael (2000). "Ernest Hemingway, 1899–1961: A Brief Biography". In Wagner-Martin, Linda (ed.). A Historical Guide to Ernest Hemingway. New York: Oxford UP. ISBN 978-0-19-512152-0.
- Roy, Pinaki (2012). Hemingway's 'A Farewell to Arms': A Critical Appraisal. Kolkata: Books Way. ISBN 978-93-81672-12-9.
- Tyler, Lisa, ed. (2008). "Teaching Hemingway's A Farewell to Arms". Kent, OH: The Kent State UP.
