= A Very Short Story =

Story by Ernest Hemingway

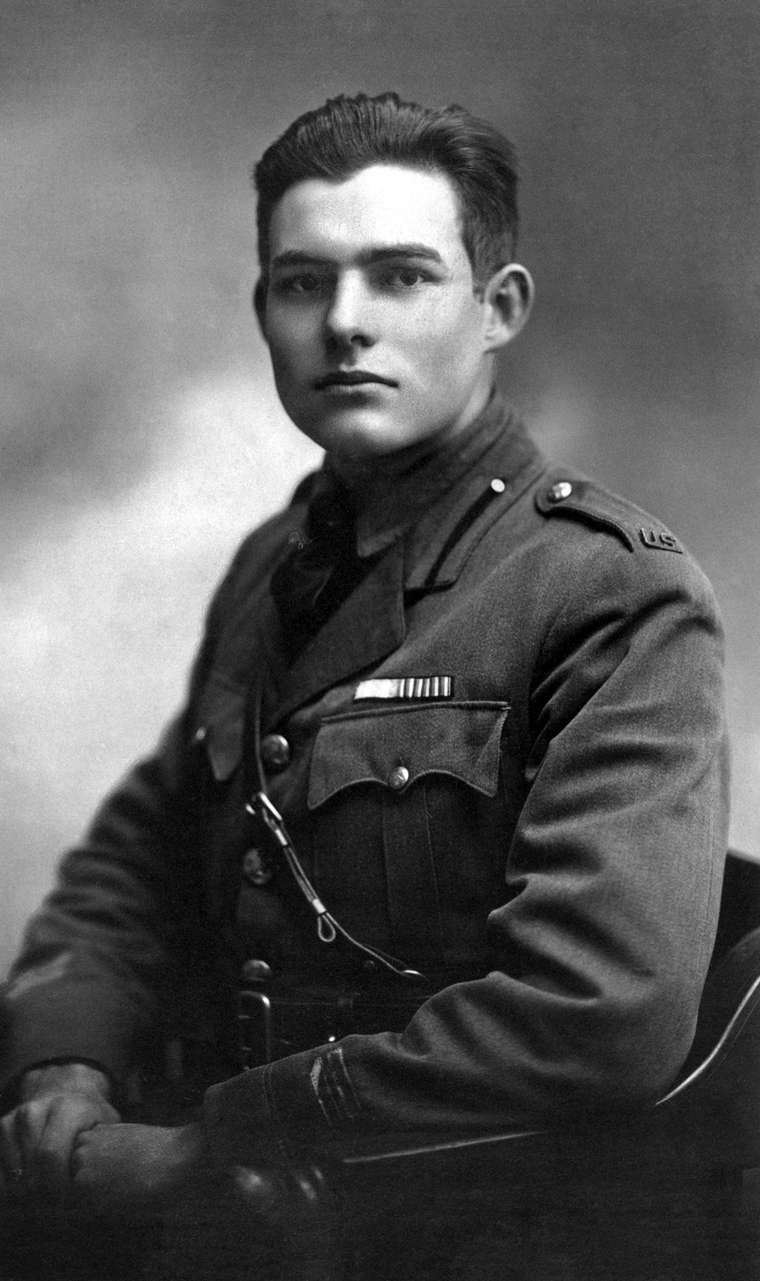
Ernest Hemingway's relationship with Agnes von Kurowsky was the basis for this story.

"A Very Short Story" is a short story written by Ernest Hemingway. It was first published as a vignette, or chapter, in the 1924 Paris edition titled In Our Time, and later rewritten and added to Hemingway's first American short story collection In Our Time, published by Boni & Liveright in 1925.

In the story, a World War I soldier and a nurse named "Luz" fall in love as she tends to him over the course of three months in a hospital in Padua. They decide to marry, but when the soldier returns home to the United States, he receives a letter from Luz with the news that she has fallen in love with an officer. Later she writes that she has not married, but the soldier ignores her. Shortly afterward, the soldier contracts gonorrhea from a sexual encounter in a taxi.

Hemingway based the story on his World War I affair with Agnes von Kurowsky, a nurse he met in Milan while recuperating in the hospital from leg injuries sustained at the Italian front.
