= A Farewell to Arms (poem) =

1590 poem by George Peele

- To Queen Elizabeth
- by George Peele
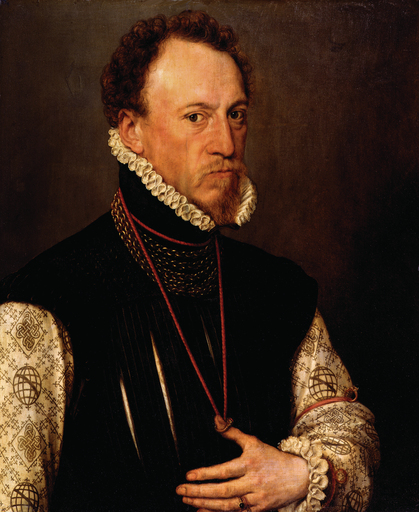
- Portrait of Sir Henry Lee of Ditchley, in whose honor Peele wrote A Farewell to Arms
- Language: English
- Series: Polyhymnia
- Form: Sonnet
- Meter: Iambic pentameter
- Rhyme scheme: ABABCC
- Publication date: 1590

A Farewell to Arms is an occasional sonnet written by George Peele. It is the coda of Peele's Polyhymnia, written for the Accession Day tilt of 1590. The prior thirteen parts of Polyhymnia are each blank verse descriptions of pairs of contestants with vague impressions of their combat, though Peele does not name the victors. A Farewell to Arms then commemorates the tenure and retirement of Sir Henry Lee as the Queen's Champion. Lee had been the Queen's Champion since the first Accession Day tilts, possibly as early as 1559. In 1590 the position passed to the Earl of Cumberland. The sonnet was set to music by John Dowland, as the 18th song in his Firste Booke of Songes (1597), and by Gerald Finzi, as the second movement of his Farewell to Arms (Op. 9, 1943). In both cases, the text was changed from first person to third person, beginning with the words "His golden locks" (instead of the original "My golden locks").

== Content ==
My golden locks Time hath to silver turnd.
O Time too swift, O swiftness never ceasing!
My youth 'gainst time and age hath ever spurnd,
But spurnd in vain. Youth waneith by increasing.
Beauty, strength, youth, are flowers but fading seen,
Duty, faith, love, are roots, and ever green.

My Helmet now shall make a hive for bees
And lovers' sonnets turne to holy Psalms.
A man at Armes must now serve on his knees,
And feed on pray'rs, that are Age his alms.
But though from Court to Cottage I depart,
My Saint is sure of mine unspotted heart.

And when I saddest sits in homely cell,
I'll teach my Swaines this Carrol for a song.
Blest be the hearts that wish my Sovereigne well,
Curs'd be the souls that thinke her any wrong.
Goddess, vouchsafe this aged man his right
To be your Beadsman now that was your knight.

— George Peele, "A Farewell to armes", Polhymnia, 17 November 1590.
