= Chris O'Donnell =

American actor (born 1970)

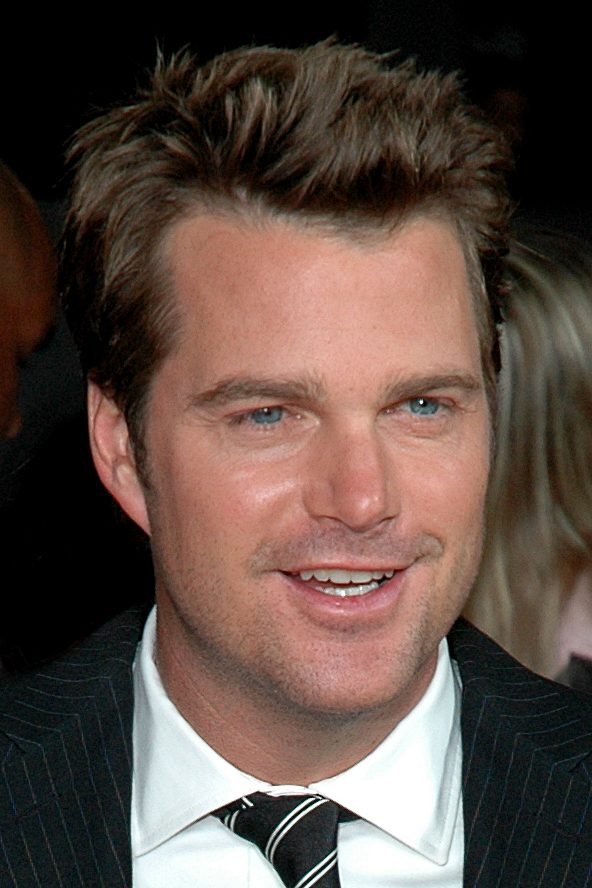
- O'Donnell at the premiere of Max Payne at Grauman's Chinese Theatre, October 2008
- Born: Christopher Eugene O'Donnell; June 26, 1970 (age 56); Winnetka, Illinois, U.S.
- Education: Boston College (BS)
- Occupation: Actor
- Years active: 1986–present
- Spouse: Caroline Fentress (m. 1997)
- Children: 5

Christopher Eugene O'Donnell (born June 26, 1970) is an American actor. After modeling and acting in numerous commercials as a teenager, he made his film debut in the comedy-drama film Men Don't Leave (1990). Following supporting roles in the films Fried Green Tomatoes (1991) and School Ties (1992), O'Donnell had his breakout with a starring role in the drama film Scent of a Woman (1992), which earned him a nomination for the Golden Globe Award for Best Supporting Actor – Motion Picture.

After starring roles in the films The Three Musketeers (1993) and Circle of Friends (1995), O'Donnell received further mainstream recognition for his role as Dick Grayson / Robin in the DC Comics superhero films Batman Forever (1995) and Batman & Robin (1997), as well as his portrayal of writer Ernest Hemingway in the romantic drama film In Love and War (1996). In the 2000s, O'Donnell starred in the films Vertical Limit (2000), Kinsey (2004), and Kit Kittredge: An American Girl (2008), and had a main role as Jack McAuliffe in the TNT television miniseries The Company (2007).

O'Donnell starred in the main role of G. Callen on all fourteen seasons of the CBS police procedural series NCIS: Los Angeles (2009–2023). He also starred in the spy comedy film Cats & Dogs: The Revenge of Kitty Galore (2010), and has a main role as Don Hart on the ABC series 9-1-1: Nashville (2025–present).

== Early life ==
O'Donnell was born in the Chicago suburb of Winnetka, Illinois, the son of Julie Ann Rohs von Brecht and William Charles O'Donnell Sr., a general manager of WBBM-AM. He is the youngest of seven children, with four sisters and two brothers, and is of German and Irish descent. He grew up in a Catholic family and attended Catholic schools. He graduated from Loyola Academy in Wilmette, Illinois, in 1988.

O'Donnell attended Boston College in Chestnut Hill, Massachusetts, and graduated with a Bachelor of Science degree in marketing in 1992. He had begun modeling at the age of 13 so he was comfortable in front of cameras and also had made commercials.

== Career ==
O'Donnell appeared in numerous commercials as a teenager, advertising Cap'n Crunch cereal and Fruit Roll-Ups snacks. In a McDonald's fast food commercial, he served NBA great Michael Jordan. An early television series role was an appearance on the TV series Jack and Mike in 1986. In the early 1990s, he appeared in several films including Men Don't Leave (1990), starring Jessica Lange; Fried Green Tomatoes (1991), appearing again with Kathy Bates from Men Don't Leave; School Ties (1992); and Scent of a Woman (1992) with Al Pacino. For the latter he received two nominations: one for a Golden Globe Award for Best Supporting Actor-Motion Picture (which was won by Gene Hackman for Unforgiven), and one for a Chicago Film Critics Association Award for Most Promising Actor (which he won). He was also named one of the 12 Promising New Actors of 1992 in John Willis's Screen World, Vol. 44.

After appearing in the film Blue Sky (1994), reuniting him with Jessica Lange, he starred in Circle of Friends (1995) with Minnie Driver, Mad Love (1995) with Drew Barrymore, and In Love and War (1996) with Sandra Bullock. O'Donnell played the character of Dick Grayson/Robin in Batman Forever, in which Barrymore also had a role. Reportedly, the field of candidates for the role of Robin included Leonardo DiCaprio, Matt Damon, Jude Law, Ewan McGregor, Corey Haim, Toby Stephens, and Scott Speedman.

Casting directors narrowed their choices to O'Donnell and DiCaprio, and finally selected O'Donnell. He reportedly was considered by 20th Century Fox studios to play the lead role of Jack Dawson in Titanic (1997), but that role was won by DiCaprio. O'Donnell had a starring role in 1996's The Chamber, based on the John Grisham novel of the same name. He reprised his role as Robin in 1997's Batman & Robin. Although it was a box-office success, the movie was critically panned and regularly appears on the list of films considered the worst. O'Donnell later said that he did not believe it turned out well.

O'Donnell did not appear in another movie for two years. He was the choice of one of the producers for the role of James Darrell Edwards III/Agent J in Men in Black (1997), but he turned it down as being too similar to his role in Batman Forever. Will Smith played this role. The subsequent films Cookie's Fortune (1999) and The Bachelor (1999) were moderately successful, while Vertical Limit (2000) was a box office hit.

After a four-year hiatus, O'Donnell returned in 2004 with the film Kinsey. He also appeared in the 2004 episode of Two and a Half Men, entitled "An Old Flame with a New Wick." O'Donnell took a lead role in the Fox Network television series Head Cases in 2005. The show was the first of the fall 2005 season to be canceled, and only two episodes were aired. He was subsequently cast as veterinarian Finn Dandridge on the ABC medical drama Grey's Anatomy.

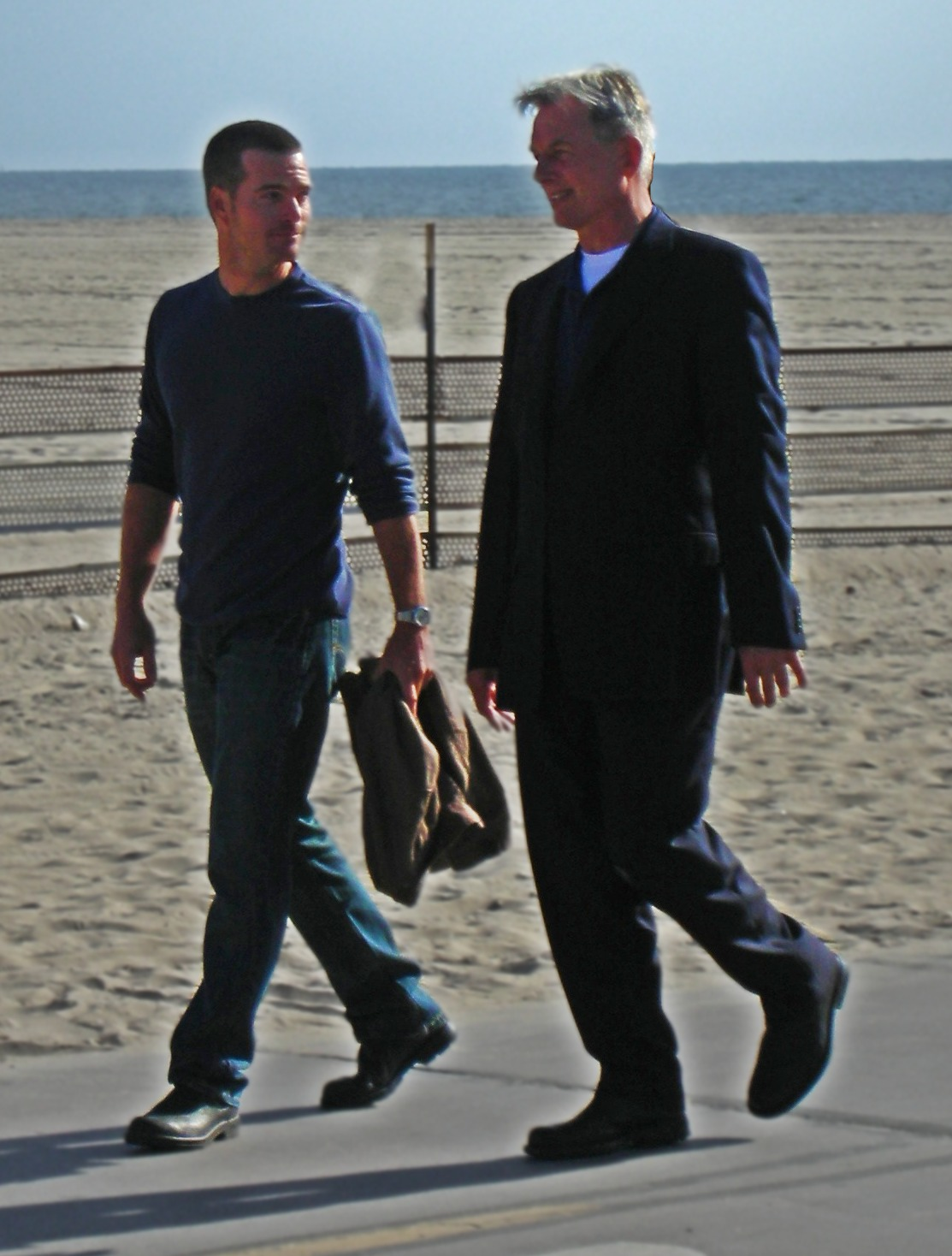
O'Donnell and Mark Harmon filming NCIS, 2009

O'Donnell was featured in the TNT miniseries The Company as CIA case officer Jack McAuliffe, a character who progressed from being a spoonfed Yale elitist to jaded, post-Cold War cynic. In 2008, he appeared in Kit Kittredge: An American Girl as the titular character's father Jack Kittredge, and in Max Payne as Jason Colvin.

From 2009 to 2023, O'Donnell starred on NCIS: Los Angeles, a spin-off of NCIS, as G. Callen, an NCIS Special Agent in Charge of the Office of Special Projects Team stationed in Los Angeles. CBS calls Callen "a chameleon who transforms himself into whomever he needs to be to infiltrate the criminal underworld." In 2010, O'Donnell appeared in the sequel to the 2001 movie Cats & Dogs, The Revenge of Kitty Galore. During an appearance on Live with Kelly and Mark on October 7, 2025 he talked about the Batman Forever props he has (costumes including outfits, one of which is from the circus aerialist scene). He has his motorcycle helmet from the film. Referring to another prop of his, a costume from The Three Musketeers, he said "even my dad wore it for Halloween one year."

== Personal life ==
O'Donnell married Caroline Fentress in April 1997 at St. Patrick Church in Washington, D.C. They have five children.

== Filmography ==
=== Film ===
Year	Title	Role	Notes
1990	Men Don't Leave	Chris Macauley	
1991	Fried Green Tomatoes	Buddy Threadgoode	
1992	School Ties	Chris Reece	
1992	Scent of a Woman	Charlie Simms	
1993	The Three Musketeers	D'Artagnan	
1994	Blue Sky	Glenn Johnson	
1995	Circle of Friends	Jack Foley	
1995	Mad Love	Matt Leland	
1995	Batman Forever	Dick Grayson/Robin	
1996	The Chamber	Adam Hall	
1996	In Love and War	Ernest "Ernie" Hemingway	
1997	Batman & Robin	Dick Grayson/Robin	
1999	Cookie's Fortune	Jason Brown	
1999	The Bachelor	Jimmie Shannon	
2000	Vertical Limit	Peter Garrett	
2002	29 Palms	The Hitman	
2004	Kinsey	Wardell Pomeroy	
2005	The Sisters	David Turzin	
2008	Kit Kittredge: An American Girl	Jack Kittredge	
2008	Max Payne	Jason Colvin	
2010	Cats & Dogs: The Revenge of Kitty Galore	Shane	
2010	A Little Help	Bob Pehlke	
2016	PG	Max	Short film

=== Television ===
Year	Title	Role	Notes
1986	Jack and Mike	Evan	Episode: "Cry Uncle"
1999	Y2K	—N/a	TV movie; Producer only
1999	Miracle on the 17th Green	—N/a	TV movie; Also executive producer
2001	The Triangle	—N/a	TV movie; Also executive producer
2003	The Practice	Brad Stanfield	4 episodes
2004	Two and a Half Men	Bill Shrader	Episode: "An Old Flame with a New Wick"
2004	The Amazing Westermans		TV movie
2005	Head Cases	Jason Payne	2 episodes
2006	Grey's Anatomy	Dr. Finn "McVet" Dandridge	9 episodes
2007	The Company	Jack McAuliffe	TV miniseries
2009 & 2023	NCIS	G. Callen	3 episodes
2009–2023	NCIS: Los Angeles	G. Callen	323 episodes
2010	WWII in HD: The Air War	John Gibbons	Voice
2012	Hawaii Five-0	G. Callen	Episode: "Pa Make Loa"
2013	Who Do You Think You Are?	Himself	Episode: "Chris O'Donnell"
2014	Robot Chicken	Mr. Fantastic / Commander Rex Kling	Voice; Episode: "Catdog on a Stick"
2017	American Dad!	G. Callen	Voice; Episode: "Casino Normale"
2017 & 2021	The Price Is Right	Himself	2 episodes
2023	NCIS: Hawaiʻi	G. Callen	Episode: "Deep Fake"
2023	Bupkis	Pete's Agent	Episode: "Crispytown"; uncredited
2025–present	9-1-1: Nashville	Don Hart	Main role
