= John Augur Holabird =

American architect (1886–1945)

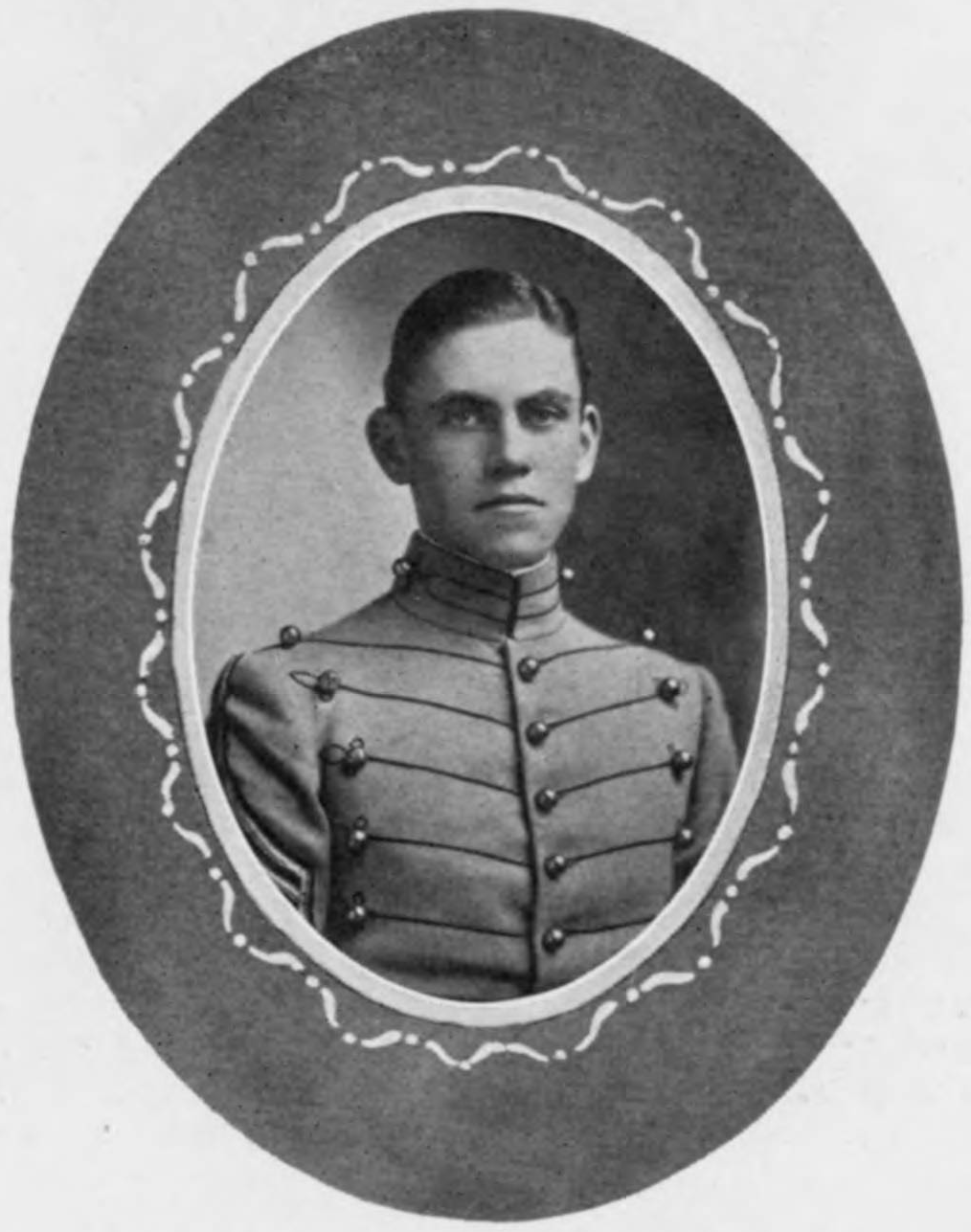
- At West Point in 1907
- Born: May 4, 1886; Evanston, Illinois, US
- Died: May 4, 1945 (aged 59); Chicago, Illinois, US
- Burial place: Graceland Cemetery
- Occupation: Architect
- Father: William Holabird

John Augur Holabird (May 4, 1886 – May 4, 1945) was an American architect based in Chicago.

== Biography ==
Holabird was born in Evanston, Illinois on May 4, 1886, the son of architect William Holabird. He was educated at The Hill School, then trained as an engineer, graduating from the U.S. Military Academy at West Point in 1907, with further study at the Washington Barracks Engineering School in 1909.

By 1913, he had completed study at Paris' École des Beaux-Arts, where he became friends with John Wellborn Root Jr., the son of another famous Chicago architect. Holabird's father had formed the architectural firm Holabird & Roche in Chicago in 1883, and the younger Holabird joined the firm in 1914. Following the deaths of William Holabird and Martin Roche in the late 1920s, John Holabird and John Wellborn Root Jr., who had also joined the firm in 1914, became the named partners of Holabird & Root.

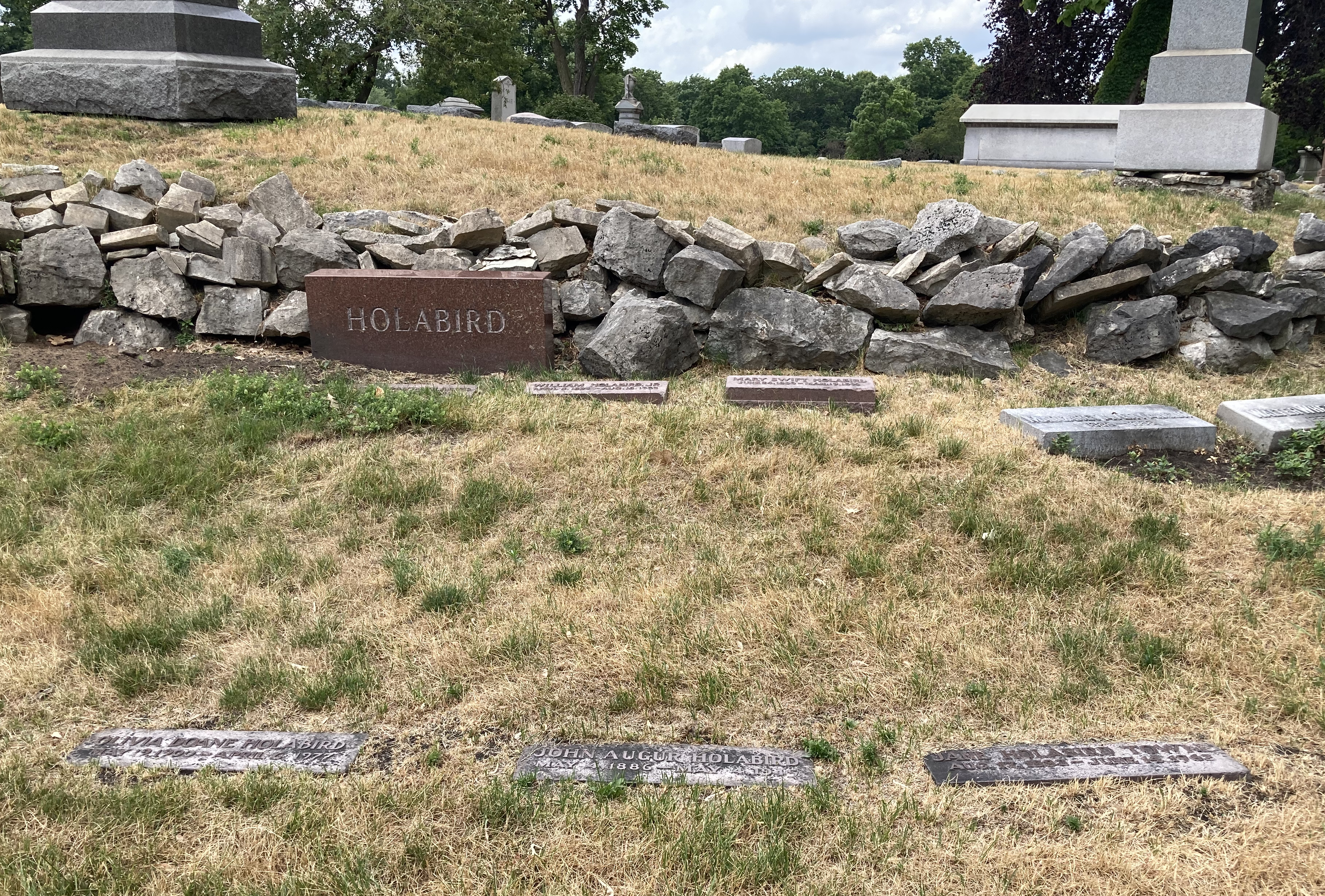
Holabird's grave at Graceland Cemetery

The firm became known for buildings in the Art Deco style, particularly Chicago skyscrapers, including 333 North Michigan Avenue, the Palmolive Building, the Chicago Daily News Building, the Chicago Board of Trade, and the Henry Crown Field House. They also designed the North Dakota State Capitol building, among others.

The firm weathered the Great Depression and is still active. Holabird died at St. Luke's Hospital in Chicago on May 4, 1945, aged 59. He was buried at Graceland Cemetery. His nephew, Bill Holabird, was named a partner in the firm in 1945, and John A. Holabird Jr., became a partner in 1970.

== Membership ==
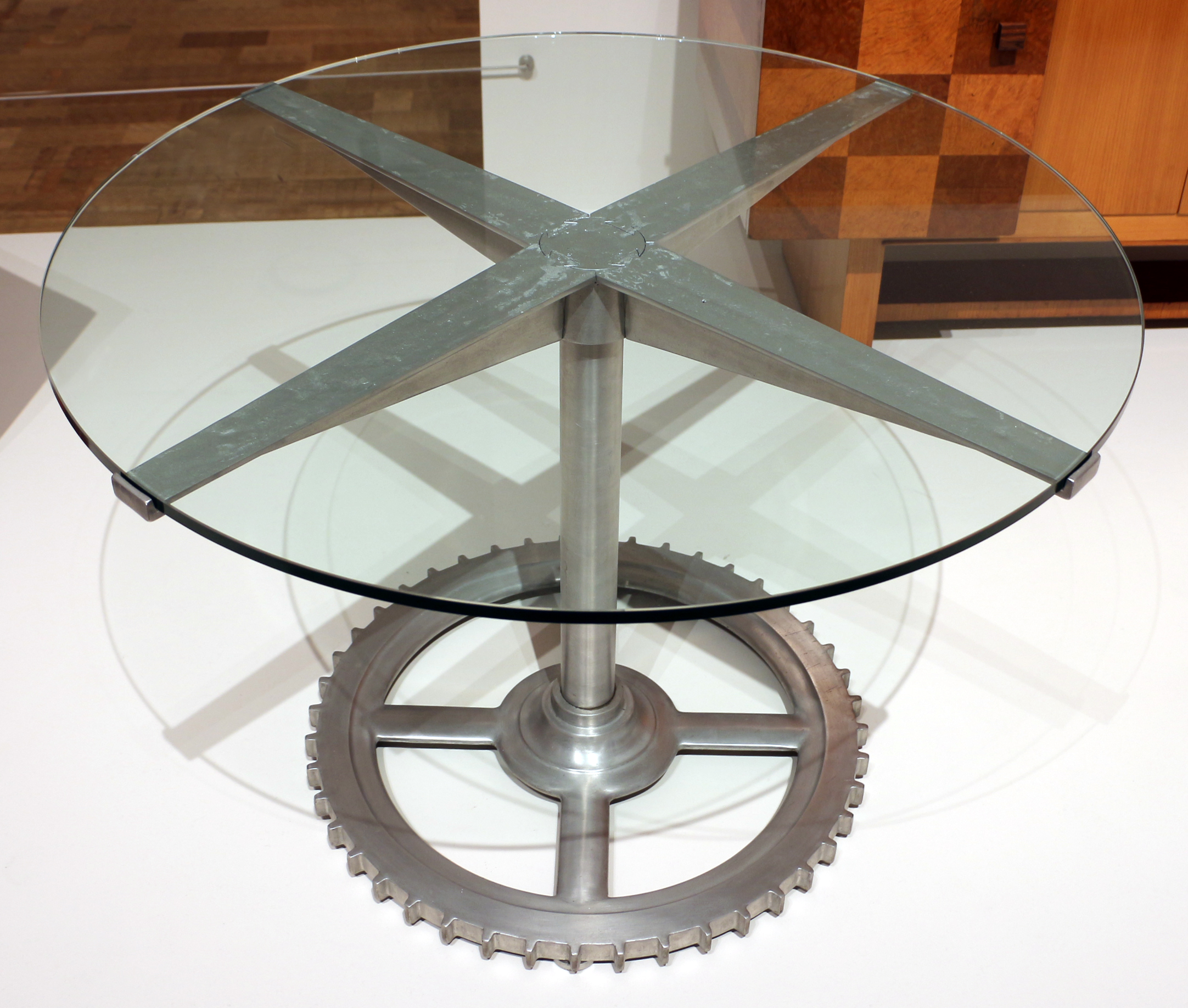
Table, 1930s

Holabird was a member of the Chicago Planning Commission, a trustee of the Art Institute of Chicago, and a designer of the Century of Progress Exposition in Chicago (1933–34). Holabird served on the U.S. Commission of Fine Arts from 1976 to 1980. The Chicago History Museum houses collections of both Holabird & Roche and Holabird & Root. In 1937, Holabird was elected into the National Academy of Design as an Associate member and became a full Academician in 1944.

== Significant buildings ==
- Palmolive Building, 1929
- 333 North Michigan Building, 1928
- Chicago Board of Trade Building, 1930
- Chicago Daily News Building, 1929
- Chrysler Building at the Century of Progress 1933–34 World's Fair
- Evanston Masonic Temple, 1926

== Sources ==
- Bruegmann, Robert. Holabird & Roche/Holabird & Root: An Illustrated Catalog of Works, 1880–1940. New York: Garland Publishing, 1991.
