= National Heritage Site (United States) =

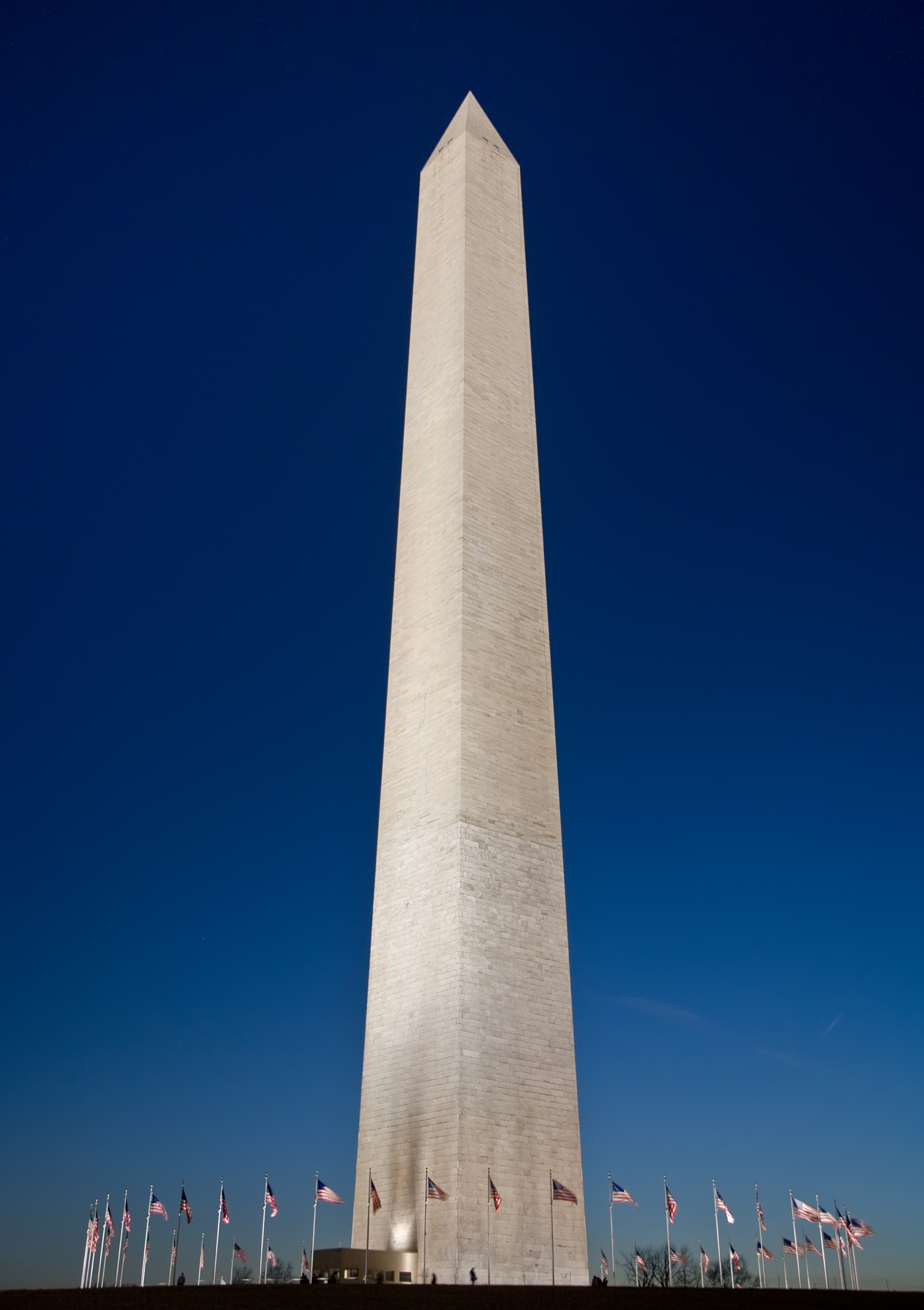
The Washington Monument is listed in the National Register of Historic Places, but though it commemorates the father of the country, it is not a national monument.

A National Heritage Site in the United States is a location important to the cultural heritage of a particular state that has been promoted to national status, as well as sites that have been deemed nationally important by central heritage agencies.

== Types of protection ==
- The National Register of Historic Places (NRHP) is the United States government's official list of districts, sites, buildings, structures, and objects deemed worthy of preservation. It includes the complete list of National Historic Landmarks.
- The National Park Service (NPS) is the U.S. federal agency reporting to the United States Department of the Interior that manages all parks that have been assigned the national park status.
- The NPS also administers many national monuments, and other conservation and historical properties (national preserves, national historic sites) with various title designations. It was created on August 25, 1916, by Congress through the National Park Service Organic Act.
- The United States Fish and Wildlife Service (FWS) is a federal government agency within the United States Department of the Interior dedicated to the management of fish, wildlife, and habitats.
- The United States Forest Service (USFS) oversees "forest reserves" and protects them from fire and other dangers from multi-use of trails. Though much of their administrative duties overlap with the NPS, the USFS reports to the United States Department of Agriculture, and not of the Interior.
- National Heritage Areas are created by Congress. They are usually administered by State-owned parks services, where the NPS has an advisory role.
- The National Association of State Park Directors is an organization that coordinates state parks at the federal level.
- Though not a specific "site", the National Trails System administers the right of way and upkeep of national scenic and historic trails, such as the Lewis and Clark Expedition.

== See also ==
- National Trust for Historic Preservation
- National Forest Foundation
- Conservation movement
- National monument
- World Heritage Site and National Heritage Site
- List of World Heritage Sites in the United States
