= Early Chicago Skyscrapers =

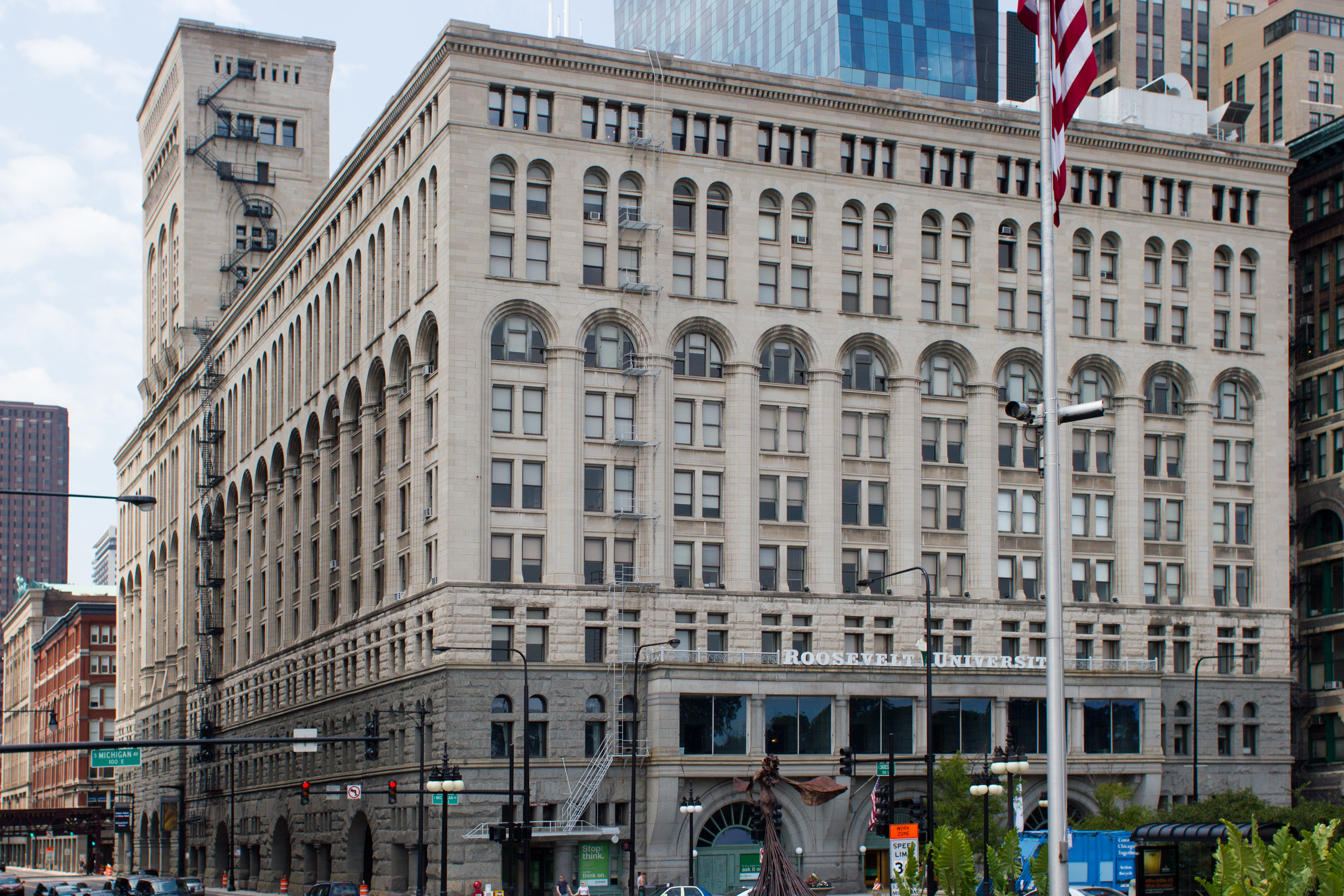
A multi-story building from the late 19th century

Early Chicago Skyscrapers is a nomination comprising nine buildings in Chicago's Loop district for inclusion on UNESCO's World Heritage Site list. Submitted by the US Department of the Interior in 2017, it is currently on the tentative list considered for nomination as a UNESCO designated World Heritage Site. Only properties that have been previously listed on a tentative list can be nominated for the World Heritage List.

These buildings were constructed in the last 20 years of the 19th century and represent the first generation of "skyscrapers", high-rise structures reaching up to 20 stories. Construction of these buildings employed novel approaches and technologies, such as the use of steel frames, first elevators, electric lights, and terracotta fireproofing. The architects developed a new aesthetic for the exterior of this new type of buildings. The skyscrapers listed are the Auditorium Building (pictured), Second Leiter Building, Marquette Building, Rookery Building, Monadnock Building, Old Colony Building, Fisher Building, Schlesinger & Mayer Building, and Ludington Building.
