= Interdisciplinary Arts =

Interdisciplinary Arts was an academic department in the School of Media Arts at Columbia College Chicago in Chicago, Illinois, United States.

== Overview ==
As one of the earliest interdisciplinary arts programs in the United States, it was an incubator for new approaches towards art-making that has shaped the development of arts professionals for over thirty-three years. Guided by the principle that interdisciplinarity "is a defining characteristic of contemporary art practice" and "a necessary prerequisite for those artists who will shape the future of creative practice", the artists who work in the Interdisciplinary Arts department investigate new terrain.

Examining concepts, forms and techniques from across the fine, performing and media arts, students work with a diverse array of unique and experimental approaches that interrogate artist books, installations, gesture and movement, sound art, durational performance, interactive media, video, performance media, papermaking, letterpress, etching and offset printing, electronically controlled artworks, online artwork, performance in artificial spaces, democratic multiples, written, spoken and performed text, dramatic forms, DIY/DIT collaborative strategies and relational art forms.

== History ==
Interdisciplinary Arts was formulated in Chicago in 1976, by Suzanne Cohan-Lange, Jean Unsworth, and Rebecca Ruben. Originally accepted by the Chicago Consortium of Colleges as a program taught across several universities, in 1981, it was established as a department with a permanent home at Columbia College Chicago. At that time, the Interdisciplinary Arts MA program was formalized within the context of the department. Since then, two MFA degrees were added: the Interdisciplinary Book & Paper Arts MFA, launched in 1994; and the Interdisciplinary Arts & Media MFA, launched in 2002. The founding of the Interdisciplinary Arts program is preceded by the undergraduate program in the Studio for Interrelated Media program founded by Harris Barron in 1969 at the Massachusetts College of Art and Design in Boston.

== Programs ==
The Interdisciplinary Arts MA is for art teachers who want to expand their repertoire of techniques, as well as assist practicing artists in expanding their practice to include new media. It is immersed in the five traditional art media that make up the heart of the program: visual art, movement, sound, writing, and drama.

The Interdisciplinary Book & Paper Arts MFA program enables students to participate in the contemporary art world by encouraging them to consider book and paper as a site for interdisciplinary practice. It promotes the understanding of hand papermaking and the book arts as artistic media with applications in cultural discourse, community building, and collaborative practice.

The Interdisciplinary Arts & Media MFA fosters an innovative dialog between the fine, performing and media arts. It is a graduate program for traditional and performing artists who want to incorporate media into their artistic practice and for media artists who want to expand into areas such as performance, installation, interactive, and relational art forms.

== Facilities ==
In the 916 S. Wabash building are housed the departmental offices, faculty offices, conference room, lecture hall, two smart classrooms, large computer lab, three installation labs and the media equipment center. Additionally, the Center for Book and Paper Arts is part of the Interdisciplinary Arts department. The Center for Book and Paper Arts occupies the entire second floor of the historic Ludington Building at 1104 South Wabash and includes a papermaking studio, a letterpress facility, a bookbindery, a gallery, a smart classroom, a multi-purpose space for performance and lectures, a computer laboratory, a critique room, studio space for artists, a resource room, and offices for the staff. Also at 1104 South Wabash are studio spaces for MFA students.

== Notable faculty ==
- Michelle Citron
- Nana Shineflug

== See also ==
- Interdisciplinary arts
