= Bertha Hofer Hegner =

American educator

- Born: December 14, 1862; Claremont, Iowa
- Died: November 1, 1937; Chicago, Illinois
- Education: Education
- Alma mater: Columbia University
- Occupation(s): Professor and President of Columbia School of Oratory
- Years active: 1890-1929
- Known for: Founder of First kindergarten program in Chicago, Illinois; Founder of Pestalozzi Froebel Teachers College; 4th President of Columbia School of Expression

Bertha Hofer Hegner (December 14, 1862 - November 1, 1937) was an educator and promoter of the Kindergarten Movement in Chicago, Illinois during the late 19th and early 20th centuries. She is remembered as the founder of the first kindergarten in Chicago, Illinois, the founder of the Pestalozzi-Froebel Teachers College, a school centered on training its students for teaching kindergarten in Chicago, and the fourth President of Columbia College of Expression.

== Biography ==
Bertha Hofer was born December 14, 1862, in Claremont, Iowa, to Andreas Franz and Marie (Ruef) Hofer. She spent her childhood there and also in McGregor, Iowa, where her father and two brothers became owners and publishers of the McGregor News. When she was twelve, she went to Jersey City, New Jersey, where she lived with an aunt and with whom she traveled through Europe, returning to McGregor, Iowa, a few years later.

She was educated at the National Kindergarten and Elementary College in Chicago and graduated in 1890, then did further graduate studies at the Pestalozzi-Fröbel-Haus, Berlin in 1895, where she studied under the tutelage of a niece of Friedrich Fröbel, the father of the kindergarten movement. From 1897 until 1898 she studied at the University of Chicago and from 1920 to 1921 she studied at Columbia University, New York.

She taught at the Alcott School in Lake Forest, Illinois, from 1890 to 1894, and started the first kindergarten at the Chicago Commons Social Settlement where she served as its first director from 1895 to 1904. In 1913 she founded the Pestalozzi-Froebel to train kindergarten teachers. Out of that grew the present Pestalozzi-Froebel Teachers College of Chicago, which she founded in 1896 and served as president until 1936.

In 1896 she married the Reverend Herman Frederick Hegner, a Congregational minister, and in addition to her duties at the school, assisted him in his ministerial work for five years at Bethany Congregational Church in Chicago and for four years in the Congregational Church at Harvey, Illinois. Rev. Hegner then left the church to join his wife in developing the kindergarten college. He retired in 1931.

In 1927, the Pestalozzi Froebel Teachers College acquired the Columbia College of Expression which suffered financial setbacks after the death of its founder, Mary A. Blood that same year. The Pestalozzi Froebel Teachers College and Columbia College of Expression operated as separate schools but shared the same faculty, staff, and resources until Columbia College of Expression became its own institution in 1944. While at the Pestalozzi Froebel Teachers College she worked with the team to establish a private school in Chicago. She served as president of Columbia College of Expression until 1936 when she retired.

She was a member of the International Kindergarten Union, the Illinois State Kindergarten-Primary Association, the Central Country Childhood Education, and Delta Phi Upsilon. She also was author of the monograph, “Home Activities in the Kindergarten,” for U.S. Bureau of Education.

She retired from active teaching in 1929 due to illness and she and her husband moved to California in 1931 for her health. In the spring of 1936, she was made president emeritus of Pestalozzi Froebel Teachers College and Columbia College of Expression and her son, Herman Hofer Hegner, became president.

The couple returned to Chicago around November 1, 1937, to fulfill her wish to live out her days in the Midwest. She died November 14, 1937, at her Chicago residence.

Academic offices
Preceded by George L. Scherger	President of Columbia College Chicago; 1929 - 1936	Succeeded by Herman Hofer Hegner
