= John B. Duff =

American historian

John Bernard Duff
- Born: July 1, 1931; South Orange, New Jersey
- Died: October 1, 2013 (aged 82); Palm Desert, California
- Occupation: President
- Years active: 1992-2000
- Employer: Columbia College
- Known for: 8th President of Columbia College

John Bernard Duff (July 1, 1931 - October 1, 2013) was an American historian born in South Orange, New Jersey, on July 1, 1931, to John Bernard Duff, Sr. and Mary Cunningham Duff. He was the oldest of four brothers: Thomas, Joseph and Peter Duff. He graduated from Our Lady of the Valley High School in 1949.

In 1955, he married Helen Dorothy Mezzanotti, to whom he was married for 33 years.

A historian, he received a B.A. from Fordham University (New York), a M.A. from Seton Hall University (South Orange, New Jersey), and a PhD from Columbia University (New York). In 1970, following a decade as a professor of history at Seton Hall University, he was appointed vice-president for Academic Affairs. In 1973, Duff became the first lay provost and executive vice-president in the history of Seton Hall.

In 1976, he became the first president of the new University of Lowell, in Lowell, Massachusetts, which would later become the University of Massachusetts Lowell.

Duff was elected as the first chancellor of the Board of Regents in Massachusetts in 1981 and served there until 1986. On November 12, 1985, he was the first non-librarian appointed as the commissioner of the Chicago Public Library system. While at that post, he supervised the construction of the Harold Washington Library, the world's largest public library.

Duff became president of Columbia College Chicago in September 1992. During his tenure at Columbia College, he oversaw the acquisition of the College's first modern residence hall, led its first long-range planning effort and expanded its local and national development initiatives. He also served as vice-chairman from 1994–1996 and as chairman from 1996-1998 of the Federation of Independent Illinois Colleges and Universities. Also during his time, the institution changed its name from Columbia College to Columbia College Chicago, effective October 28, 1997.

He was the father of six children with his wife Helen Dorothy Duff (née Mezzanotti) including, Michael John Duff, Maureen (Reenie) Ellen Duff, Patricia Jean Duff Bernacki, John Andrew Duff, Robert Matthew Duff and Emily Anne Duff. He was grandfather to eight, including Claudia Duff Bernacki, Nicholas John Duff, Henry John Bernacki, Casey Oliver Duff, Madelaine Sarah Duff, Charlotte Anne Duff, Emma Carrie Duff and Kathryn Jane Duff.

Until his passing, Duff resided in Palm Desert, California, with his second wife Estelle M. Shanley.

== Publications ==
- The Structure of American History (1970) ISBN 0-690-69137-8
- The Nat Turner Rebellion: The Historical Event Controversy (1971)
- The Irish in the United States(1971) ISBN 053400038X
- Slavery: Its Origins and Legacy(1957, 1975) ISBN 0-690-00458-3

Academic offices
Preceded by Mirron (Mike) Alexandroff	President of Columbia College Chicago; 1992 – 2000	Succeeded by Warrick L. Carter
Preceded by Office Established	President of the University of Lowell; 1976 – 1981	Succeeded by William T. Hogan
