= Old Colony Building =

The Old Colony Building may refer to:

- Colony Club buildings in New York City
- Old Colony Building (Chicago), former name of a Chicago Landmark on the National Register of Historic Places
