= Interdisciplinary arts =

Interdisciplinary arts are a combination of arts that use an interdisciplinary approach involving more than one artistic discipline.

Examples of different arts include visual arts, performing arts, musical arts, digital arts, conceptual arts, etc. Interdisciplinary artists apply at least two different approaches to the arts in their artworks. Often a combination of art and technology, typically digital in nature, is involved.

== See also ==
- Electronic Visualisation and the Arts
- Interdisciplinary Arts Department, Columbia College Chicago
- Museums and Digital Culture
- Universidad Nacional de las Artes, leading Interdisciplinary Arts programs in Argentina.
- PhD Program in Interdisciplinary Arts, National Dong Hwa University
- The School of Interdisciplinary Arts, Ohio University

== Bibliography ==
- Calow, Jane; Hinchcliffe, Daniel; Mansfield, Laura, eds. (2014). Speculative Strategies in Interdisciplinary Arts Practice. Underwing Press. ISBN 978-0992818500.
- Chao, Tai-Kuang (2018). Kyong Mee Choi's The Eternal Tao Interdisciplinary Arts: Music, Choreography, Lighting, and Videography. University of Chicago, Department of Composition and Theory.
- de Rijke, Victoria, ed. (2019). Art and Soul: Rudolf Steiner, Interdisciplinary Art and Education. Landscapes: The Arts, Aesthetics, and Education. Vol. 25. Springer Nature. ISBN 978-3030176044.
- Ervin, Barbara Mickelsen (1998). Making Connections: Interdisciplinary Art Activities. Walch Publishing. ISBN 978-0825137334.
- Paetznick, Susan E. (1984). An Individualized Interdisciplinary Art Heritage Program for Secondary Schools. University of Wisconsin–Madison .
- Soccodato, Renee (2007). Interdisciplinary Arts Education: A Case Study Examining the Collaborative Planning Process. Walden University.
- Stokrocki, Mary, ed. (2005). Interdisciplinary Art Education: Building Bridges to Connect Disciplines and Cultures. National Art Education Association. ISBN 978-1890160319.
