= America's State Parks =

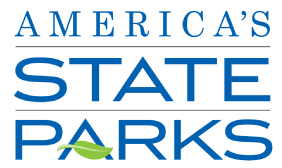
America's State Parks Logo

America's State Parks is a strategic alliance formed in 2010 of all 50 state park systems, the National Association of State Park Directors (NASPD). America's State Parks is committed to giving a unified voice to all of the country's state park systems in Washington and national politics. America's State Parks ensures that the national and natural treasures are protected and that the voice from each state park visitor is heard.

As the founder of the National Park Service, Stephen Mather, has said, "Who will gainsay that the parks contain the highest potentialities of national pride, national contentment, and national health? A visit inspires love of country; begets contentment; engenders pride of possession; contains the antidote for national restlessness...He is a better citizen with a keener appreciation of the privilege of living here who has toured the nation's parks."

The First Day Hikes program of free, guided hikes on New Year's Day in state parks across all fifty states is conducted under the aegis of America's State Parks.

Facts About America's State Parks
| Total Park Visits | More than 725 million per year |
| Number of state park units | 6,624 |
| Total economic impact on communities | More than $20 billion |
| Percent of visitors with children | 64% |
| Miles of Trails | 41,725 |
| Number of Campsites | 207,063 |
| Number of Cabins and Lodges | 7,161 |
