= First Day Hikes =

Guided hike program in the United States

First Day Hikes logo

First Day Hikes is a program of free, guided hikes offered by the fifty state park systems of the United States each year on New Year's Day. The program began locally in Massachusetts in 1992 and then went nationwide in 2012 under the aegis of the America's State Parks alliance.

The hikes are intended to promote an alternate way of celebrating the new year by going outside, getting some exercise, and experiencing local nature and history. In 2017, for instance, more than 62,000 people participated in First Day Hikes, covering over 110,000 miles (180,000 km) on some 1,300 hikes around the nation. Or in 2026, when there were around 73,000 people hiking some 150,000 miles (240,000 km).

== Hikes ==
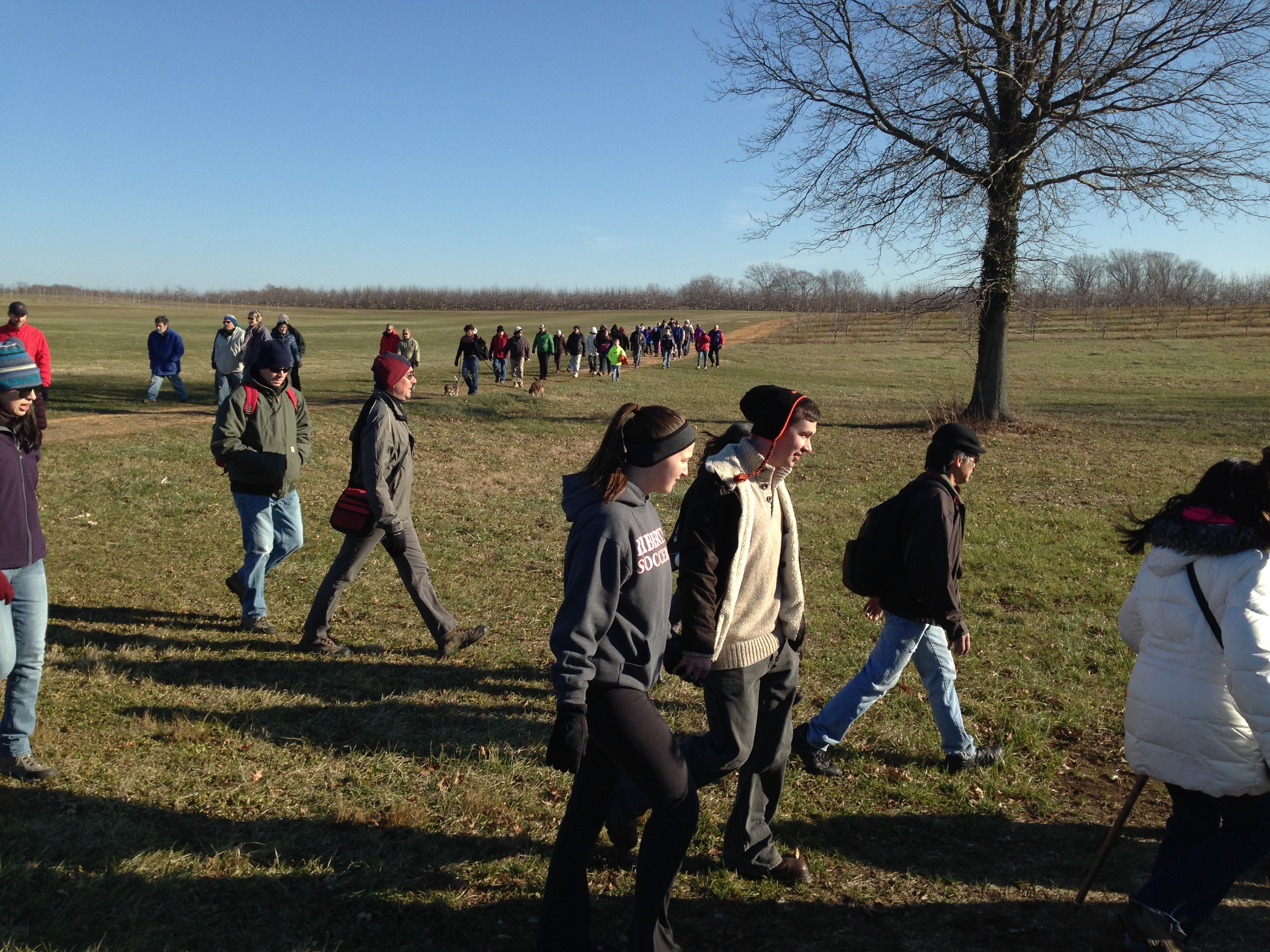
A group of First Day Hike participants in 2015 at Monmouth Battlefield State Park in New Jersey makes a turn after crossing an open field

The number of different hikes offered within each state varies, with for example in 2018 New Jersey listing 30, Oklahoma having 19, and California offering over 80 of them.

Hikes vary widely in duration and difficulty, with many being 1–3 miles (1.6–4.8 km) in length, easy-to-moderate in difficulty, and starting between 10 a.m. and 1 p.m. and taking one to two hours to complete. However some are very short and easy and are family-friendly for all ages, while others are strenuous with significant elevation gains. Still others, such as at Spruce Run Recreation Area in New Jersey or at Red Rock Canyon State Park in California, are all-day affairs. Walks often stop to hear the guides describe local flora, fauna, or historical sites of interest, such as at Monmouth Battlefield State Park in New Jersey. In some locations, park officials offer hot drinks and treats after the hikes. The number of participants on any given hike can range from a dozen to a hundred or more; some hikes even draw two or three hundred people, and in any case numbers often vary depending upon the weather.

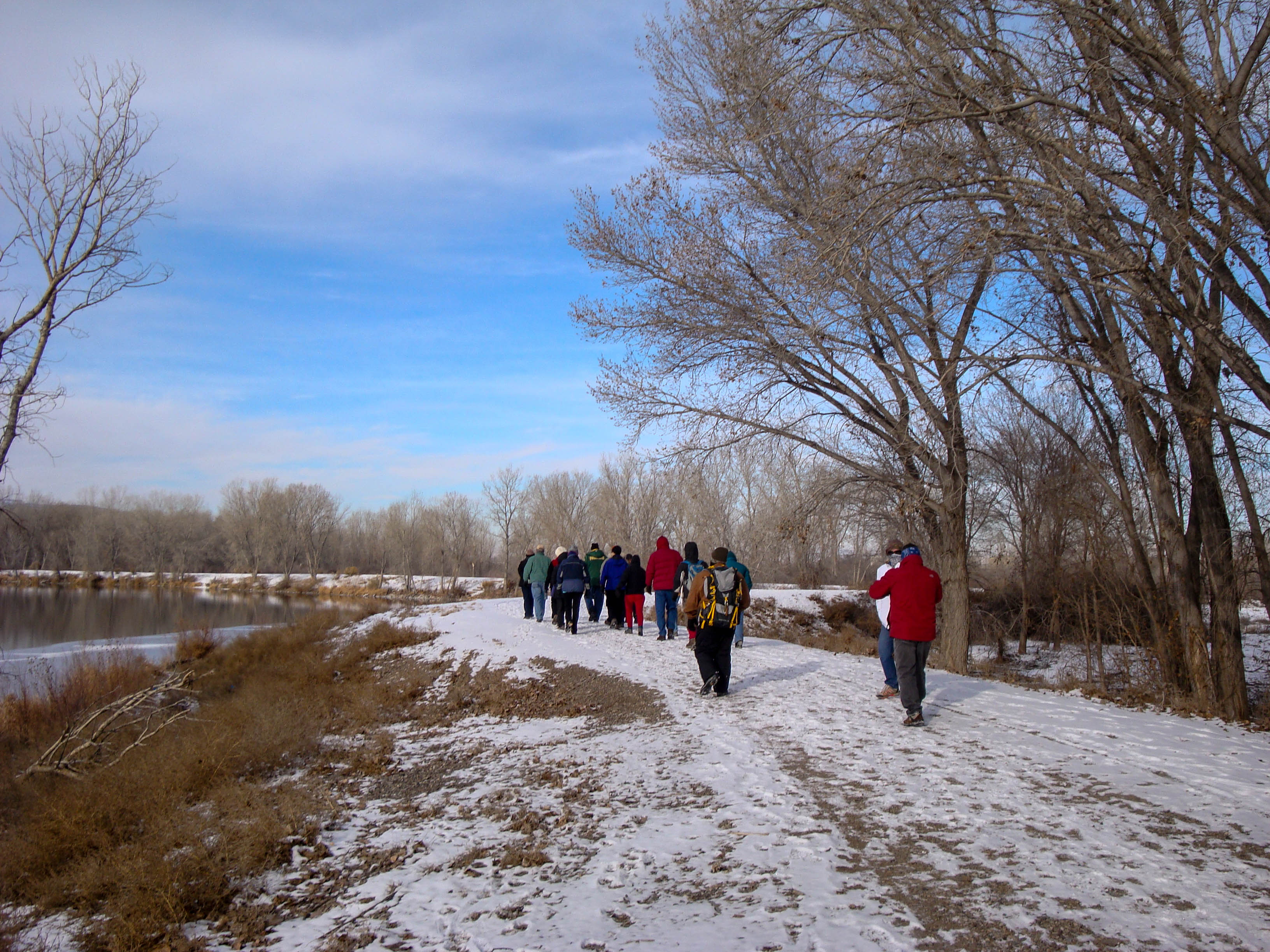
A First Day Hike in James M. Robb – Colorado River State Park in Colorado in 2015

In some cases, such as at Spring Mountain Ranch State Park in Nevada, guides may take participants into areas of a park normally off-limits to the general public. A few hikes feature modes other than walking, such as horseback riding, mountain biking, or all-terrain vehicles. Night hikes have even been held when there is an especially bright moon.

Cold weather is usually expected on January 1 across much of the nation and participants are advised to dress in layers appropriately. In cases of severe winter weather some of the hikes in a state may be cancelled, while others go on. People do turn out even in very cold weather, with for instance over 1,000 participants across Indiana in 2018 despite an average high temperature in the state that day of 1 °F (−17 °C).

== History ==
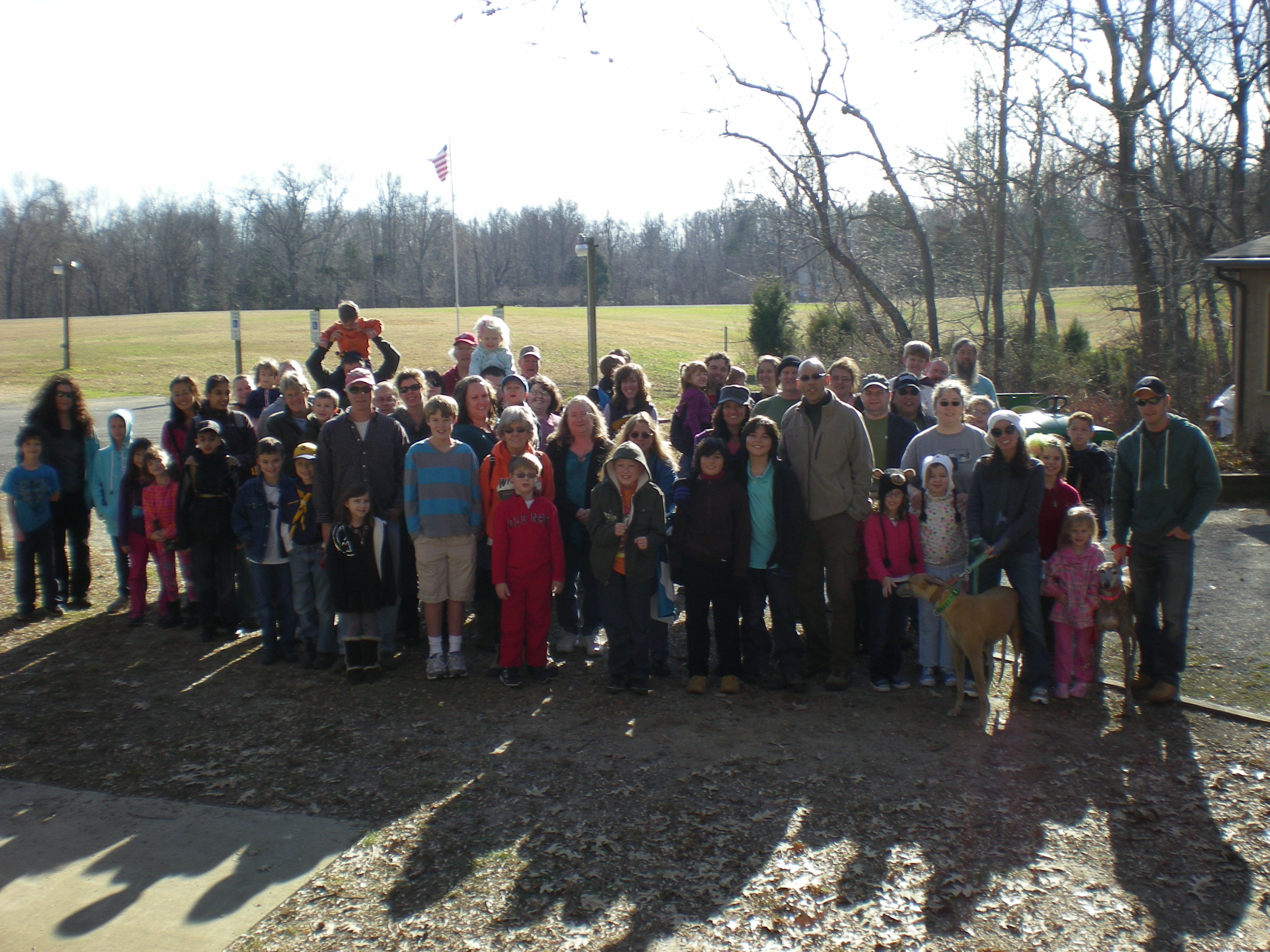
A group of all ages during a First Day Hike in Caledon State Park in Virginia in 2012, the first year the practice went national

The tradition began on January 1, 1992, at the Blue Hills Reservation state park in Norfolk County, Massachusetts outside of Boston. It was the idea of Patrick Flynn, supervisor of Blue Hills Reservation, who had remembered a February winter hike taking place in his home state of Ohio. The New Years Day hike at Blue Hills drew 380 people that first year, and has since become so popular at that site that the parking lots become full and people must stop their cars along nearby roadsides. The start of 2018 marked the 27th annual First Day Hike at Blue Hills Reservation. For his contribution, Flynn subsequently received an award from the National Association of State Park Directors; as one Massachusetts state official said at the ceremony, "One person having one idea can really spark a revolution."

Breakheart Reservation in Massachusetts was another park that started the practice early on. Then in 2008, hikes were added at other sites in Massachusetts under the sponsorship of the Massachusetts Department of Conservation and Recreation. The hikes continued to grow in popularity in that state.

Independently, another first day walk tradition began on January 1, 1970, in Assateague State Park on the Maryland Eastern Shore. It was started by two women who sought to celebrate the beauty of Assateague Island and rally against plans to develop it. It subsequently became an annual tradition, with the 30th iteration taking place in 2010, and became very popular over time, with people driving from various other parts of the state to join in with up to 300 others. The Ilia Fehrer / Judy Johnson Memorial Beach Walk, named after the two women who started it, is now part of Maryland's roster of First Day Hikes.

During 2011, Priscilla Geigis, the director of state parks in the Massachusetts Department of Conservation and Recreation, suggested that other state park directors in nearby states adopt the practice. The idea quickly spread and by the end of the year, state park directors across the country had become involved. Thus, First Day Hikes became a nationwide event on January 1, 2012, under the America's State Parks association, with some 400 hikes being offered. The practice has continued to grow in popularity since then. In 2016, about 55,000 participants were involved in the hikes nationwide. with that number exceeding 62,000 in 2017 with some 1,300 hikes being given.

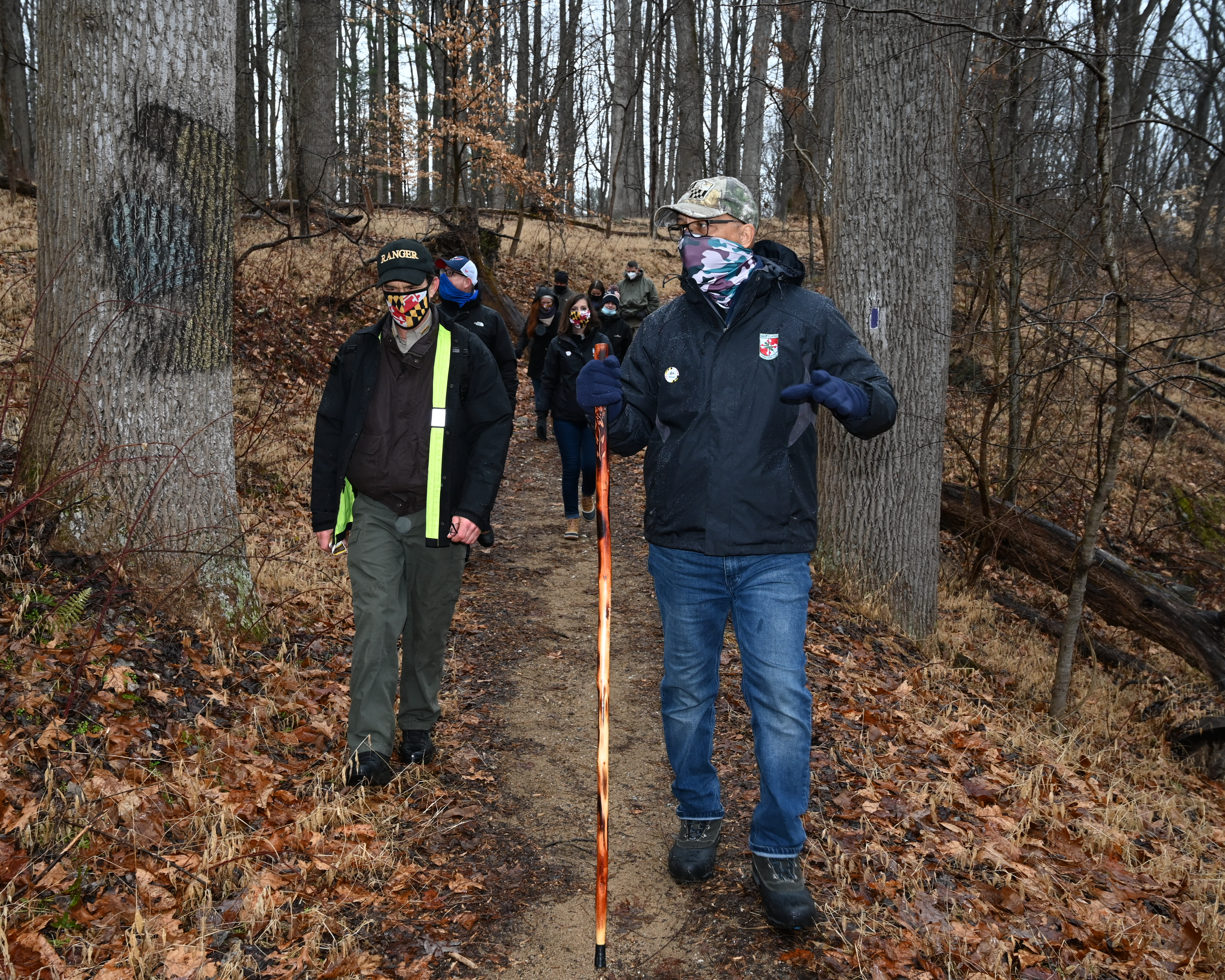
Masks being worn by hikers in 2021 at Patapsco Valley State Park in Maryland

The effects of the 2017–18 North American cold wave, which gave frigid temperatures across much of the nation, resulted in numbers for 2018 decreasing to 32,000 participants across some 1,200 hikes. The numbers rebounded in 2019 with 55,000 people engaging in hikes that totally some 133,000 miles walked. The start of a new decade on January 1, 2020 saw almost 85,000 people hiking a total of over 175,000 miles.

The COVID-19 pandemic in the United States had an impact on First Day Hikes as it did almost everything else. For the January 1, 2021 hikes, some states such as New Jersey and Minnesota cancelled them altogether, with perhaps suggestions for what could be undertaken on one's own; some states such as Connecticut and Arkansas offered self-guided hikes, with provisions to share experiences virtually afterward or gain participation badges; and some states such as New York and West Virginia went forward with guided hikes, but on a smaller scale and with social distancing related measures in place.

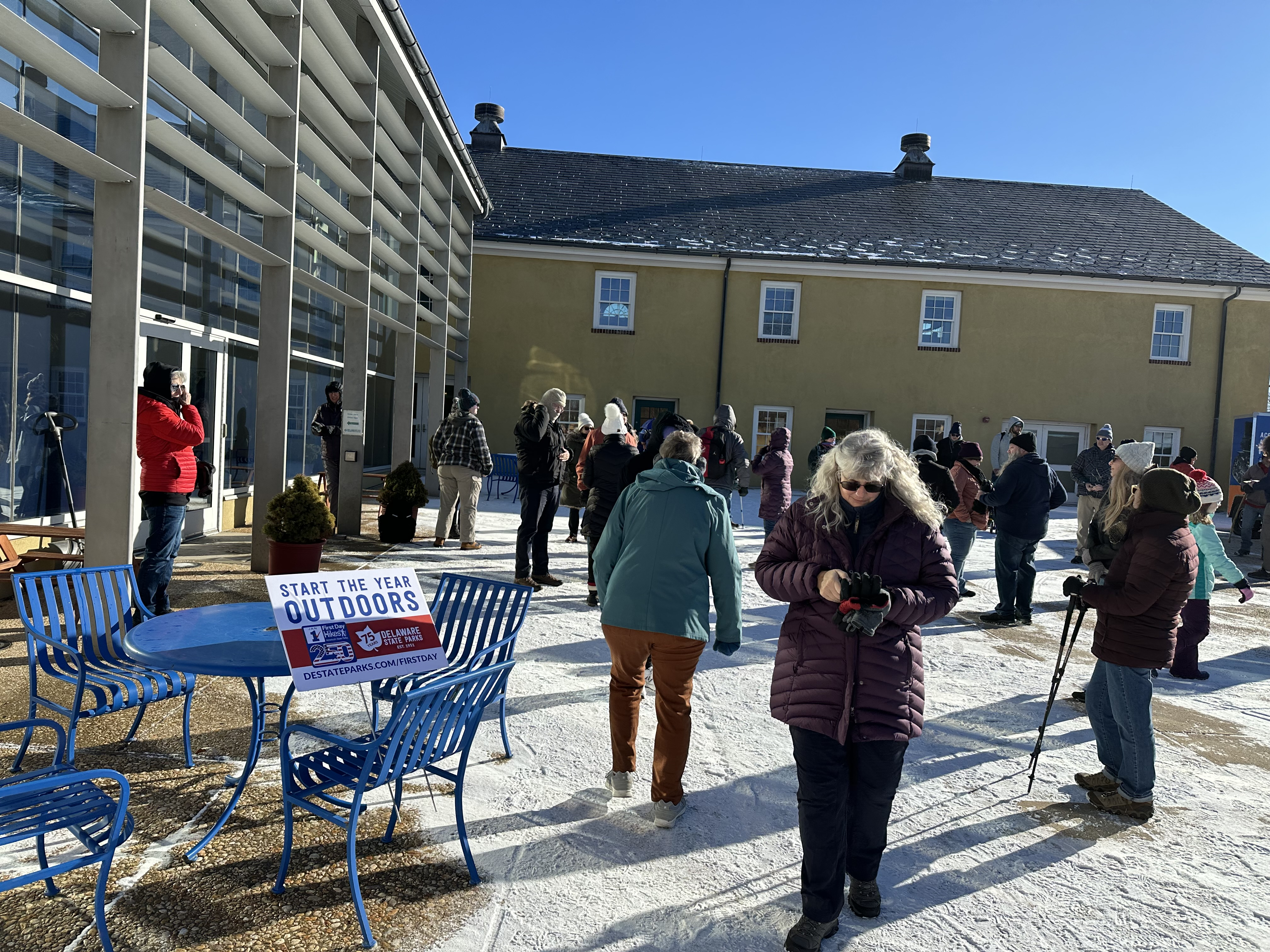
Sign showing both America 250 branding and a state park system's 75th anniversary, at the start of a hike in Alapocas Run State Park in Delaware in 2026

Beginning in 2023, the number of hikes rebounded to levels roughly similar to before the pandemic, with over 1,000 hikes being offered in a year. In 2024, Texas set a record for any state by having 17,000 total miles hiked in a single year. Nationwide, the year 2024 also saw milestones being reached of over 500,000 participants having walked over 1,000,000 miles during the existence of the program.

In some cases, first day hikes can be associated with milestones in a state's park system, such as in 2026 when they marked the beginning of celebration of the 75th anniversary of Delaware's state park system. Nationwide, the year 2026 also saw revised branding for the First Day Hikes program to associate it with the United States Semiquincentennial.

== Purpose ==
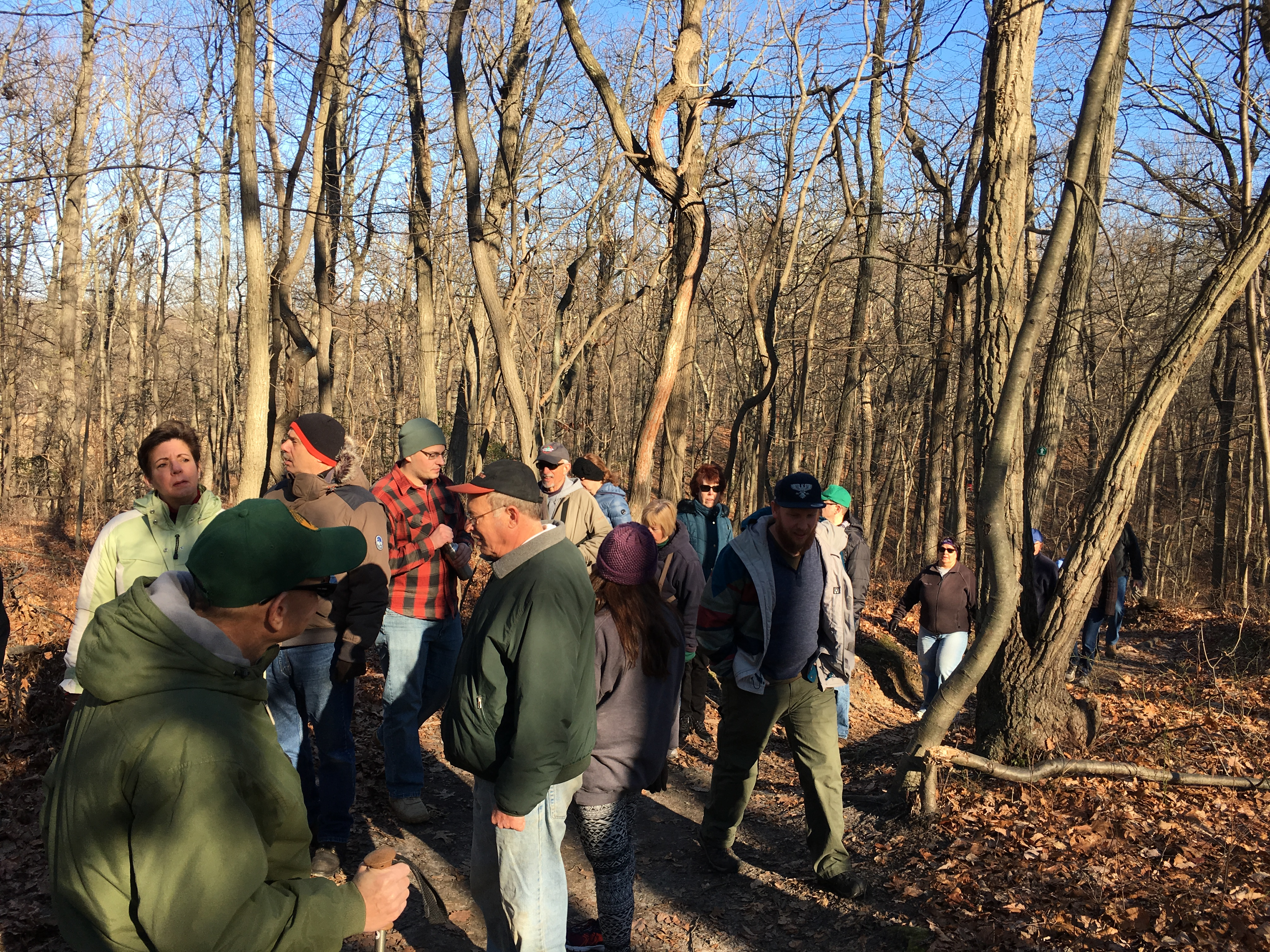
A guide checks on the progress of his group during a First Day Hike in Cheesequake State Park in New Jersey in 2017

The America's State Parks association proclaims, "What better way to kick off the New Year than by getting a jump start burning off those extra holiday calories in the great outdoors?" (The association emphasized that idea one year by saying that the hikes burned off the equivalent of over 41,000 fast-food hamburgers.) Or as New Jersey's park system says about the activity, "These free First Day Hikes offer a great incentive to get outside, exercise, experience history, enjoy nature, and celebrate the New Year with friends and family in one of your state parks." As one state parks official in Massachusetts itself said, "We want to launch the year saying, 'Get outside!'"

Some people engage in First Day Hikes to counteract the effects of New Year's Eve celebrations the night before, while others find the outdoor activity the best aspect of the whole holiday. Still others view it as a mechanism to mark a personal reset for the year ahead. A parks official in Iowa said, "We started this as a health initiative, but it's really just grown into a good way to spend time with the family and do something that you maybe normally wouldn't do on that holiday."
