= Center for Book and Paper Arts =

Columbia College Chicago teaching institution

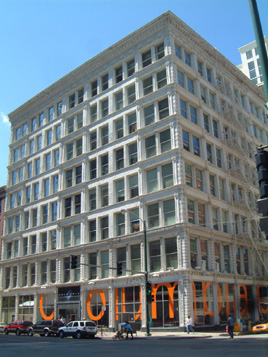
Center for Book and Paper Arts on Wabash

The Center for Book and Paper Arts is part of Columbia College Chicago, located in Chicago, Illinois. The Center is the largest book-and-paper-arts teaching institution in the United States, which is housed on the second floor of the historic Ludington Building. The Center teaches letterpress, papermaking, bookbinding, artists' book creation. The Center has a history of dedication to furthering knowledge and appreciation of book arts". In addition to teaching classes for interested individuals from the community, the Center is part of the Interdisciplinary Arts Department at Columbia College Chicago, whose programs include an MFA in Interdisciplinary Book and Paper Arts.

The Interdisciplinary Arts Department full-time faculty who teach at the Center for Book and Paper Arts primarily include: Director and Associate Professor Melissa Potter and lecturer Miriam Schaer.

The Center for Book and Paper Arts also has a large 4,000-square-foot (370 m^{2}) gallery space whose exhibition history includes work by Enrique Chagoya, Bruno Richard, a 2008 exhibition of the iconic manuscript scroll of On the Road by Jack Kerouac, and a 2009 exhibition featuring Buddhist Printing techniques from the Derge Parkhang.
