= Mark Coniglio =

- Born: 1961 (age 64–65); Omaha, Nebraska, United States
- Occupations: Media artist; composer; programmer

Mark Coniglio (born 1961 in Omaha, Nebraska) is a media artist, composer, and programmer. He is recognized as a pioneer in the integration of live performance and interactive digital technology. With choreographer Dawn Stoppiello he is co-founder of Troika Ranch, a New York City based performance group that integrates music, dance, theater and interactive digital media in its performance works. He is also the creator of Isadora, a flexible media manipulation tool that provides interactive control over digital video and sound.

== Career ==
A native of Nebraska, his career began with a five-year tenure as a producer for American Gramaphone Records, during which time he received a performance of his work by the London Symphony Orchestra. He studied at the California Institute of the Arts with electronic music pioneer Morton Subotnick and received his degree in music composition in 1989. He taught courses in Interactive Music and was on the staff of the Center for Experiments in Art, Information and Technology at CalArts from 1990 to 1994. He also worked as an assistant to film composer Danny Elfman before leaving Los Angeles for New York City in 1994.

Coniglio’s work with Stoppiello has been recognized with several honors. Their evening-length work Future of Memory was awarded a 2003 Dance Audience Bessie Award, an honorary mention at the 2004 Prix Ars Electronica Cyberarts Competition, and a 2005 “Eddy” Award from Live Design Magazine in New York City. Coniglio is a two-time recipient of the Digital Artists Fellowship at Dance Theater Workshop, and was selected to facilitate that program in 2005.

Recent collaborations outside Troika Ranch include creating video environments for Laurie Anderson's new "Homeland" concert in New York City, serving as video artist for the production of "Die Süße unserer traurigen Kindheit" by composer Hans Tutschku, and creating a wireless camera system for choreographer Judith Jamison for a performance by Alvin Ailey American Dance Theater

=== Programming ===
Coniglio remains particularly interested in creating custom interactive systems that allow the movements or vocalizations of dancers to manipulate video, sound, and light in real-time. His first technological breakthrough in this area came in 1989 when he created MidiDancer, a wireless system that measured the angular change at several joints on the dancer's body, allowing the performer interactively control music. He later collaborated with Morton Subotnick to create Interactor, a graphic programming tool that allowed real time manipulate of MIDI audio and other digital media. He continued this process when he created Isadora. Initially created solely to realize the works of Troika Ranch, Isadora is currently in use by hundreds of artists worldwide to facilitate the creation of their interactive performance works or installations.

== Musical style ==
Dense rhythmic constructions and the use of sampled sound to create unusual percussive instruments are two of the hallmarks of his compositions. His music was perhaps best described by Keyboard Magazine who said “Coniglio’s [music] consistently expresses a deep, sustained heaviness and ferocity. Powered by big drum sounds, surging phrases, and throbbing rhythms, it attacks the listener with stealth and force.”
