= Ida Morey Riley =

- Born: April 11, 1856; Mercer County, Illinois
- Died: March 7, 1901; Chicago, Illinois
- Education: Oratory
- Alma mater: Monroe College of Oratory
- Occupation(s): Professor and President of Columbia School of Oratory
- Years active: 1890-1901
- Known for: Co-Founder of Columbia School of Oratory

Ida Morey Riley (April 11, 1856 - March 7, 1901) was a teacher of Elocution and Expression in the late 19th century. She is known for being a co-founder and First Co-president of Columbia College Chicago.

== Biography ==
Ida Morey was born on April 11, 1856, to William and Sarah Morey in Mercer County, Illinois. Later, the family moved to Union Township, Iowa. Her father, originally from Ohio, was a farmer and her mother, originally from New York, was a housewife.

She attended the public schools of Chariton, Iowa. On October 4, 1877, she married Heston G. Riley of Ashley, Ohio. He died January 19, 1879. She returned to Iowa to teach and later become principal of the Chariton, Iowa public school that she attended as a youth.

She then taught at the State Agricultural College at Ames, Iowa, where she met Mary A. Blood in 1887, who had been sent out from the Emerson School of Oratory (now Emerson College) in Boston to teach elocution and expression.

Blood urged her to move to Boston and study at the Emerson School where she graduated with a bachelor's degree in Oration in 1889 and a master's degree in Oration in 1890. She then joined Mary Blood in Chicago where the two women established the Columbia School of Oratory (now Columbia College Chicago) in 1890. Anticipating a strong need for public speaking at the 1893 World's Columbian Exposition, which celebrated the 400th anniversary of Christopher Columbus's arrival in the Americas, Blood and Riley were inspired to open their school in the exposition city, Chicago, and adopt the exposition's name.

She served as secretary of the National Association of Elocutionists and was a member of its board of directors until her death on March 7, 1901. Funeral services were held at the residence of Helen E. Starrett as both Mary Blood and Ida Riley had been living there. Dr. Frank W. Gunsaulus conducted the services and Mary Blood read selections from the Bible. She is buried next to her husband in Ashley, Ohio.

Academic offices
Preceded by None	Co President of Columbia College Chicago; 1890 - 1901	Succeeded by George L. Scherger
