= George L. Scherger =

3rd President of Columbia College Chicago

- Born: October 21, 1874; Laurenceburg, Indiana
- Died: March 31, 1941 (aged 66); Chicago, Illinois
- Education: Cornell University
- Occupations: Pastor & Educator
- Years active: 1899-1941
- Employer: Columbia School of Expression
- Known for: 3rd President Columbia School of Expression

George L. Scherger (October 21, 1874 – March 31, 1941) was an American minister, musician, writer, historian, and educator in Chicago, Illinois. He was the third President of Columbia College Chicago from 1927 to 1929.

== Biography ==
Scherger was born in Lawrenceburg, Indiana, on October 21, 1874, to Christian and Margaret (née Rush) Scherger, both recent immigrants from Germany.

He was educated at the Indiana University (A.B., 1894); the University of Leipzig (1895–1890); and the University of Berlin in Germany (1896–1898), and received a PhD in 1899 from Cornell University. He married Bertha Mittelstadt from Prussia in 1899. He was a minister, musician, writer, historian, and educator who was a professor of history at the Armour Institute of Technology (now Illinois Institute of Technology) and at the Columbia College of Expression (now Columbia College Chicago), in Chicago, Illinois. He also was pastor of St. Paul’s Evangelical Lutheran Church, the oldest German Lutheran Church in Chicago at the time. He taught at the Armour Institute from 1899 until 1933. He was the pastor and superintendent of the Armour Mission, 1905–1931 and in 1936 he was awarded the medal of honor of the German Red Cross.

He wrote on the subjects of history and political science and his books include The Evolution of Modern Liberty, You and Your World, The Genesis and Development of the American and the French Declarations of the Rights of Man, The Evolution of the German Empire, and Mummies and How to Revive Them. He lectured as part of the Chautauqua Lecture Circuit and spoke widely around the Midwest on topics such as The Mission of Culture and Lincoln: A Man for the Ages.

At the Columbia College of Expression, he began teaching classes in English and English Literature in 1915. By the early 1920s, he was Dean of the departments of Public Speaking, Public Debate & Lectures, and History. He was appointed president after the death of Mary A. Blood in 1927 and served until 1929 when he became assistant pastor of St. Paul’s Evangelical Lutheran Church.

He died March 31, 1941, in Chicago. His pallbearers included Illinois governor Dwight H. Green, Chicago Mayor Edward Joseph Kelly, US Senator Wayland Brooks, and department store owner W.A. Wieboldt.

Academic offices
Preceded by Ida Morey Riley	President of Columbia College Chicago; 1927–1929	Succeeded by Bertha Hofer Hegner
