= Isadora (software) =

Graphic programming software

- Original author: Mark Coniglio
- Initial release: 2000; 26 years ago
- Stable release: 4.1.3 / July 2025; 10 months ago
- Operating system: macOS, Windows
- Website: troikatronix.com

Isadora is a proprietary graphic programming environment for Mac OS X and Microsoft Windows, with emphasis on real-time manipulation of digital video. It was first released in 2000. It has support for Open Sound Control and MIDI. Isadora was designed by Mark Coniglio.
