= Anchor Graphics =

Coordinates: 41°52′25.4″N 87°37′31.8″W

Anchor Graphics is a non-profit fine art printshop and gallery in Chicago, Illinois that is part of the Art + Design Department at Columbia College Chicago. It was founded in 1990 by David Jones and Marilyn Propp. It is known for the quality of its prints as well as its educational programming.

== Programs ==
For twenty years, Anchor provided free classes for high school students, and had an outreach program called Press on Wheels (POW) which brought printmaking into schools, galleries, museums, and community centers. Workshops were open to students of all ages and taught handmade prints. During the Toulouse-Lautrec and Rembrandt exhibitions at the Art Institute of Chicago, a press was brought to the museum, and Anchor staff demonstrated the print processes and tools used by both artists. Ann Weins writes in DEMO 3, pages 24–28: "Anchor Graphics maintains an impressive schedule of classes, workshops, residencies, and lectures, all the while publishing exquisite, hand-pulled prints."

The Artist-in-Residence Program was created to provide uninterrupted use of the shop by national and international printmakers for research and the development of new work. Scraping the Surface, a free lecture series open to the public, presented talks by artists, curators, museum specialists, conservators, collectors, and others with an interest in prints, and was funded by the Terra Foundation for American Art from 2006 - 2010.

Located in Ukrainian Village, and then Chicago's River North, Anchor moved to the South Loop upon becoming a part of the Art + Design Department at Columbia College Chicago in 2006. According to David Mickenberg, former director of the David Museum and Cultural Center, and of the Block Museum at Northwestern University, " [Anchor's reputation] has to do with. . . the balancing act between education and collaborative printmaking. . . " Anchor provides Artist-in-Residencies, open studio time for the Chicago community, adult classes, and publishing and contract work.

Master Printers David Jones and Chris Flynn have published editions by artists such as the late Ed Paschke, the late Ellen Lanyon, Jim Nutt, Kay Rosen, Karl Wirsum, Phyllis Bramson, Eleanor Spiess-Ferris, Kerry James Marshall, Rachel Niffenegger, Saya Woolfolk and others.

== Funding ==
Anchor Graphics is funded from private donations and from the Illinois Arts Council. Previous funders include the MacArthur Foundation Fund for Arts and Culture
