= Norman Alexandroff =

- Born: July 24, 1887; Kishinev, Russia
- Died: May 26, 1960; California
- Other names: Nime Kulczinsky
- Occupation: Radio broadcaster & Educator
- Years active: 1922-1960
- Employer: Columbia College
- Known for: 6th President of Columbia College

Norman Alexandroff (July 24, 1887 - May 26, 1960) was Jewish-Russian immigrant to the United States who became known as a radio broadcaster in the early 20th century and a developer of the radio broadcasting curriculum at the Pestalozzi Froebel Teachers College and the Columbia College of Expression in Chicago, Illinois. When the Pestalozzi Froebel Teachers College and the Columbia College of Expression separated in 1944, Alexandroff became the fifth president of Columbia College.

== Biography ==
Nime Kulczinsky was born to Samuel and Rashell (née Corbert) Kulczinsky on July 24, 1887, in Kishinev, Russia. He was tutored by an older brother, Alexander, at home and never attended formal school. Russia was not safe for progressive-thinking Jewish men at this time (e.g., the Kishinev pogrom), and he left Russia around 1902, walking from Kishinev to Brenmen, Germany, taking a boat to England, then another, the S.S. Westernlands, to America. He arrived in Philadelphia in 1904 with $5.00 and training as a locksmith. He lived with the Weiss family in Philadelphia, Pennsylvania, later changing his name to Norman Alexandroff.

By 1908, he was a master toolmaker and mechanic and worked in factories and machine shops in Philadelphia, Pittsburgh, New York, and Milwaukee. He became fluent in English and gave speeches, engaged in debates, and wrote articles. In 1911 he was part of lecture team with musician Von Liebnicht where he discussed drama and they became a popular feature on the national lecture circuit. In 1912 he became a naturalized citizen. In 1916, with writer William Dean Howells, he organized reading centers for foreign-born people and with Howells, David Starr Jordan, and Jack London, founded the Literary Association of America which he served as president until 1922.

In 1922, he married Cherrie Phillips in New York then moved to Chicago where Cherrie taught in the Chicago public school system. In 1931, he developed a radio program, Pages from Life, recounting the adventures of the fictional Mr. Rubin and his Hurry-up Substitute Company; he played all the parts. He then produced The Rise of America radio program, later known as Cavalcade of America. Concurrently, he also organized several community programs in opera, theater, and music and penned a study, Children and Radio, which provoked national discussion about the effect of radio on children.

In 1934, Herman Hofer Hegner, acting president of Petalozzi Froebel Teachers College and Columbia College of Expression, asked Alexandroff to begin a course of study at Columbia for radio broadcasting. By 1937, he had become vice president of Columbia College of Expression and was a member of both institutions Board of Directors along with Herman Hofer Hegner, his wife Erme Rowe Hegner, and Cherrie Alexandroff.

In 1939 he served as director of the Howard Association, an organization dedicated to the rehabilitation and aid to released prisoners and in 1940 he started the National Artists Foundation to launch young actors into their careers.

In 1944, Columbia College of Expression became a separate institution from the Pestalozzi Froebel Teachers College and was now known simply as Columbia College. The school held several credentials, including the Illinois State Examining Board for Teacher Education credential, qualifying it to enroll G.I. Bill veterans. In the same year, Norman, with psychologist Dr. Daniel D. Howard, wrote The Occupational and Educational Adjustment of Veterans, a study looking at the effects of war on returning veterans. Columbia College was designated as one of fifteen Veterans Guidance Centers in the United States which made available free comprehensive testing, educational and occupational counseling and psychological services to World War II veterans.

During the 1950s, Norman began Columbia College Pan-Americano in Mexico City, Mexico, and Columbia Los Angeles, in Los Angeles, California. Both of these campuses became independent of its parent, Columbia College Chicago in the late 1950s. His wife, Cherrie, died October 20, 1954, and he married Leonora in 1958. He served as president of Columbia College Chicago until his death on May 26, 1960, in California. His son, Mirron (Mike) Alexandroff succeeded him as president of the college in 1961.

Academic offices
Preceded by Herman Hofer Hegner	President of Columbia College Chicago; 1944 - 1960	Succeeded by Mirron (Mike) Alexandroff
