= Columbia College Chicago =

Private art college in the US

- Columbia College Chicago seal
- Former names: Columbia School of Oratory (1890–1904); Columbia College of Expression (1904–1928, 1928–1944); Mary A. Blood School of Speech Arts (1928); Columbia College (1944–1997)
- Motto: Esse Quam Videri
- Motto in English: To be, rather than to seem
- Type: Private art college
- Established: 1890; 136 years ago
- Endowment: $311 million (2021)
- President: Shantay N. Bolton (July 2025)
- Faculty: 573
- Students: 5,570 (2024)
- Undergraduates: 5,368 (2024)
- Postgraduates: 148(2024)
- Location: Chicago, Illinois, 60605, United States; 41.87391°N 87.62498°W
- Campus: Urban
- Website: www.colum.edu

Columbia College Chicago (CCC) is a private art college in Chicago, Illinois, United States. Founded in 1890, it has 4,200 students (as of fall 2025) pursuing degrees in more than 40 undergraduate and graduate degree programs. It is accredited by the Higher Learning Commission.

As of July 1, 2025, Shantay N. Bolton is the president and CEO of Columbia College Chicago.

Columbia College Chicago is the host institution of several affiliated educational, cultural, and research organizations, including the Center for Black Music Research, the Center for Book and Paper Arts, the Center for Community Arts Partnerships, the Dance Center of Columbia College Chicago, and the Museum of Contemporary Photography (MoCP).

Columbia College Chicago is not affiliated with Columbia University, Columbia College Hollywood, or any other Columbia College in the United States. However, Columbia College Hollywood was originally founded as a branch campus of Columbia College Chicago from 1952–1957.

== History ==
Columbia College Chicago was founded in 1890 as the Columbia School of Oratory by Mary A. Blood and Ida Morey Riley, both graduates of the Monroe Conservatory of Oratory (later Emerson College), in Boston, Massachusetts. Anticipating a strong need for public speaking at the 1893 World's Columbian Exposition, which celebrated the 400th anniversary of Christopher Columbus's arrival in the Americas, Blood and Riley were inspired to open their school in the exposition city, Chicago, and adopt the exposition's name. Blood and Riley became the college's first co-presidents, until Riley died in 1901; Blood served in this capacity until she died in 1927. The women established a co-educational school that "should stand for high ideals, for the teaching of expression by methods truly educational, for the gospel of good cheer, and for the building of sterling good character" in the Stevens' Art Gallery Building, 24 East Adams Street.

The school ran as a sole proprietary business from 1890 to 1904, when the school became incorporated by the state of Illinois. On May 5, 1904, the school incorporated itself again in order to change its name to the Columbia College of Expression, adding coursework in teaching to the curriculum.

When Blood died in 1927, George L. Scherger assumed the office of president after serving as a former member of the board of directors. Under his leadership, Scherger signed the paperwork at the board's annual meeting on April 14, 1928, to change the school's name to the Mary A. Blood School of Speech Arts. However, by April 30, 1928, the school reverted its name to the Columbia College of Expression by the board of directors, George L. Scherger, Herman H. Hegner, and Erme Rowe Hegner. During Scherger's presidency, the college became an official sister institution with the Pestalozzi-Froebel Teachers College, a family-run school centered on training its students for teaching kindergarten. As the president of the Pestalozzi-Froebel Teachers College, Bertha Hofer Hegner assumed the role as the fourth president of Columbia College of Expression in 1929 when Scherger resigned to become an assistant pastor of St. Paul's Evangelical Lutheran Church.

Hegner served as the institution's head, although due to illness, her son, Herman Hofer Hegner served as acting president of the institutions from 1930 until 1936. By 1934, college curriculum also focused on the growing field of radio broadcasting. In 1934, Herman Hofer Hegner hired Norman Alexandroff, a radio programmer, to develop a radio curriculum for the colleges, as both institutions were suffering financially. When Bertha Hofer Hegner retired in 1936 for health reasons, she was made president emeritus of the institutions and Herman Hofer Hegner became the institutions' official president.

During Herman Hofner Hegner's presidency, the Columbia College of Expression was advertised under different names including, Columbia College of Speech and Drama, the Radio Institute of Columbia School of Speech and Drama, and Columbia College of Speech, Drama, and Radio. However, the college was never incorporated under any of these names by the state of Illinois. As the radio program gained prominence, Alexandroff was named as the vice president of the Columbia College of Expression and became a member on the board of directors at both institutions by 1937.

The college left its partnership with the Pestalozzi-Froebel Teachers College, named Norman Alexandroff as its president, and filed the Columbia College of Expression as a not for profit corporation on December 3, 1943. On February 5, 1944, the college re-filed as a not for profit corporation and changed its name to Columbia College. During the late 1940s and early 1950s, the college broadened its educational base to include television, journalism, marketing, and other mass-communication areas. Alexandroff also oversaw the development of the extension campuses of the school, Columbia College Pan-Americano in Mexico City, Mexico, and Columbia Los Angeles in Los Angeles, California. Both of these campuses became independent of their parent in the late 1950s. Prosperity was short lived, however, and by 1961, the college had fewer than 200 students and a part-time faculty of 25.

Norman Alexandroff remained the president of the college until his death on May 26, 1960, and his son, Mirron (Mike) Alexandroff, assumed the role of president by 1961. Mike Alexandroff had worked at the college since 1947 and as president, he created a liberal arts college with a "hands-on minds-on" approach to arts and media education with a progressive social agenda. He established a generous admissions policy so that qualified high school graduates could attend college courses taught by some of the most influential and creative professionals in Chicago. For the next thirty years, Alexandroff worked to build the college into an urban institution that helped to change the face of higher education.

With this renewed focus on building its academic program, the institution was awarded full accreditation in 1974 from the North Central Association of Colleges and Schools and in 1984, received accreditation for its graduate programs. In 1975, when the college's enrollment exceeded 2,000, it purchased its first real estate, the 175,000-square-foot (16,300 m^{2}) building at 600 South Michigan Avenue (the building is known as the Alexandroff Campus Center). At the time of Alexandroff's retirement in 1992, the college served 6,791 students and owned or rented more than 643,000 square feet (59,700 m^{2}) of instructional, performance, and administrative space.

From 1992 until 2000, John B. Duff, former commissioner of the Chicago Public Library and former chancellor of the Massachusetts Board of Regents of Higher Education, served as the college's president. On October 28, 1997, the college changed its name to Columbia College Chicago, and the institution continued to expand its educational programs and add to its physical campus by purchasing available buildings in the South Loop. This played a significant part in its presence in the South Loop and downtown Chicago. The college's campus occupies almost two dozen buildings and utilizes over 2.5 million square feet.

In 2000, Warrick L. Carter became the college's president. Through 2010, under his leadership, the college created student-based initiatives such as Manifest, the annual urban arts festival celebrating Columbia's graduating students, and ShopColumbia, a store where students can showcase and sell their work on campus; partnered with local universities to construct the University Center; purchased campus buildings; added curricula; and oversaw the college's first constructed building, the Media Production Center.

The college has grown international exchanges, including associations with Dublin Institute of Technology, the University of East London, and the Lorenzo de' Medici Italian International Institute. Through the vast diversity of students and graduates, the school brings a rich vision and a multiplicity of voices to American culture, encouraging students to "author the culture of their times".

However, Columbia has not been exempt from internal and external criticism. During the 2011–12 school year, the college administration attempted to implement a set of sweeping changes to the college's curriculum, staffing policies, and overall institutional structure, through an initiative dubbed Blueprint | Prioritization. As the specifics of the changes and cutbacks came to light over the course of the school year, students and faculty from affected departments and majors vocalized their opposition to the cutbacks by staging protests during administrative meetings, mic-checking Interim Provost Louise Love during an open hearing about the proposed cutbacks, and circulating petitions calling for certain decisions, and even the entire process, to be reversed, citing "union busting" practices, consistent tuition hikes, and frequent, unexplained personnel changes across the college.

Press coverage and local awareness of the college's troubles surrounding Prioritization increased rapidly after Deanna Issacs, a reporter for the Chicago Reader, was shut out of President Warrick Carter's annual State of the College Address to the student body, which had been advertised as "open to the public." During the meeting, at which the president had been questioned extensively by students about cutbacks and tuition hikes, Carter appeared to lose his temper at one point, aggressively telling a student to "shut up," in his response to a question about his salary, which exceeds $400,000 per year. In addition to the reader, the grievances voiced over the Blueprint | Prioritization cutbacks received coverage in the Chicago Tribune, the Chronicle of Higher Education, and Time Out Chicago.

As of September 2012, most of the proposed changes from Prioritization had yet to be implemented. Programs and departments that were at one point or another slated for cuts include the Center for Black Music Research, the Chicago Jazz Ensemble, the Ellen Stone Belic Institute for the Study of Women and Gender in the Arts and Media, the Fiction Writing Department (whose Chair was let go without explanation after 20+ years of service in April 2011, only to be reinstated just months later after a student uproar over the firing), the college's recycling program, which employed student workers to collect refuse, and the top-10 ranked Cultural Studies program, one of the few standalone undergraduate programs of its kind in the nation.

On May 9, 2012, President Warrick Carter announced he would retire a year earlier than expected, stepping down at the end of the 2012–13 academic year.

On July 1, 2013, Kwang-Wu Kim became Columbia College's 10th president. Kim holds a Doctorate of Musical Arts and an Artist Diploma from the Peabody Institute of Johns Hopkins University, where he studied with pianist and conductor Leon Fleisher and served as Fleisher's teaching associate.

In February 2024, Kim announced that he would step down as president in July 2024, replaced by an interim president. Jerry Tarrer was appointed as the Interim President following Dr. Kim's departure. Tarrer was laid off in 2026 as part of budget deficits.

=== Presidents ===
- Mary A. Blood, 1890–1927
- Ida Morey Riley, 1890–1901
- George L. Scherger, 1927–1929
- Bertha Hofer Hegner, 1929–1936
- Herman Hofer Hegner, 1936–1944
- Norman Alexandroff, 1944–1960
- Mirron (Mike) Alexandroff, 1961–1992
- John B. Duff, 1992–2000
- Warrick L. Carter, 2000–2013
- Kwang-Wu Kim, 2013–2024
- Jerry Tarrer, 2024–2025 (Interim President)
- Shantay N. Bolton, 2025–Present

=== Adjunct Faculty Strike ===
From October 30 to December 17, 2023, the Columbia College Faculty Union (also known as CFAC), took part in the longest adjunct faculty strike in US labor history. The strike was for 49 days.

The CFAC represents approximately 600 part-time faculty members, or approximately two-thirds of the total faculty.

The foremost reason the strike took place was because over 50 courses from the Fall semester and over 300 courses from the Spring semester were intended to be cut. The majority of said courses were being taught by adjunct faculty. This caused alarm for both faculty and students, because the cuts would increase class sizes, despite small class sizes being a large draw for students who chose the college. The decreased number of courses offered would also potentially reduce the amount of selection and availability for students to take courses they needed to graduate. Non-adjunct faculty were concerned that their increased class sizes would overload them with work and that their curriculum would have to change to accommodate a lecture size class, as opposed to the more intimate class setting they were accustomed to.

During the strike, all classes taught by adjunct faculty were not in session. Eventually the college had adjunct faculty who were not striking and full time faculty substitute for the classes that were going untaught.

On December 17, the CFAC and Columbia College mutually reached a tentative agreement. Then on December 21 the CFAC announced that the agreement was formally approved, thus ending the strike completely.

On December 21, the college also informed students that they would be refunded $500 for each class they were enrolled in that had been affected by the strike. This refund was given in the form of a deduction on their Spring tuition bill.

== Academics ==
Academic programs at the college are organized into eight schools:

- The School of Audio and Music
- The School of Business and Entrepreneurship
- The School of Communication and Culture
- The School of Design
- The School of Fashion
- The School of Film and Television
- The School of Theatre and Dance
- The School of Visual Arts

The former School of Media Arts previously housed the department of Interdisciplinary Arts. The programs within that department have since been absorbed into other schools and departments.

== Campuses ==
Columbia has a nontraditional campus located in the South Loop and Near South Side of Chicago. The college owns sixteen academic, gallery/performance, administrative, and student residential buildings, and leases additional office and student residential space in four buildings. Most of the campus is contained in an area bounded by Ida B. Wells Drive, State Street, Roosevelt Road, and Michigan Avenue. Many of Columbia's buildings were built in the early 20th century and were acquired by the school as it expanded.

The college also operates an intensive five-week Semester in Los Angeles program on the premises of Raleigh Studios in Hollywood, California, for upper-level (80+ credit hours completed, 3.0 GPA) Cinema Art & Science, Television, Communication and Media Innovation, Music, and Business & Entrepreneurship students.

=== Alexandroff Campus Center ===
Alexandroff Campus Center

Located at 600 S. Michigan Avenue, Columbia College's Main Building was built in 1906–07 by Christian A. Eckstorm, an architect popular for his industrial and warehouse designs, to serve as the headquarters of the International Harvester Company. 600 S. Michigan was a modern skyscraper of its era, built with a steel skeleton, high-speed elevators, electric light, the most advanced mechanical systems available and a floor plan designed to maximize natural light for all of its interior office spaces. The 15-story brick-clad building with classical stone detailing has an Art Deco lobby that retains much of its original marble. In 1937 the building was purchased by the Fairbanks-Morse Company, makers of railroad locomotives, farm equipment and hydraulic systems. It was acquired by Columbia College in 1975. In its early years as the home of Columbia, it was adaptively reused to house classrooms, the library, darkrooms, studios, and an auditorium. When the campus expanded through the acquisition of other buildings, especially after 1990, some of these functions, such as the greatly expanded library, were moved to other locations, and the spaces were again adapted. The building continues to serve as the administrative center of the college, and houses the Museum of Contemporary Photography on its first two floors, along with the 180-seat Ferguson Memorial Theater, photography darkrooms, three professional television studios, film/video editing facilities, and classrooms.

=== 33 East Ida B Wells Drive ===
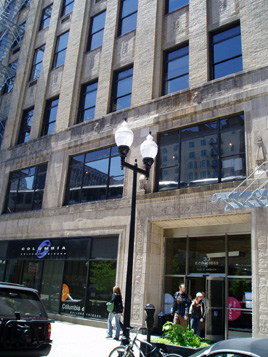
Congress Campus

The 33 East Ida B Wells Drive (formerly 33 East Congress) Building was built in 1925–26 by noted Chicago architect Alfred S. Alschuler, who designed the 1927 Chicago Mercantile Exchange. The seven-story brick and terra cotta "Congress-Wabash Building" was commissioned by Ferdinand W. Peck, Jr., a real estate developer, and initially housed a bank, offices, and recreation rooms that included dozens of pool tables. A national billiards championship was held here in 1938. By the 1940s, the building was known by the name of its major tenant, the Congress Bank. In the 1980s, it became the home of MacCormac College. Columbia leased space in the building starting in 1997 and purchased the structure in 1999. It currently houses administrative offices, classroom space and the college's radio station (WCRX 88.1 FM). The building is home to Columbia's American Sign Language-English Interpretation, Audio Arts & Acoustics, Journalism and Radio departments.

=== 623 South Wabash Avenue ===
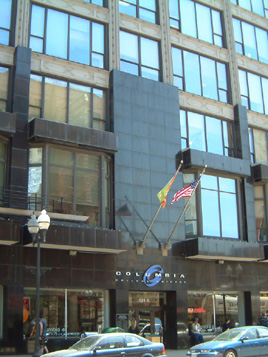
Wabash Campus Building

623 South Wabash Avenue was built in 1895, designed by Solon S. Beman, architect of the industrial town of Pullman, one of the 19th century's largest, most complex, and globally famous planned industrial communities for the Pullman Palace Car Company. The ten-story 623 South Wabash building was originally built for the Studebaker Brothers Carriage Company of South Bend, Indiana as its Chicago regional office and warehouse facility. It was later owned by the Brunswick Corporation, makers of wood furnishings and built-in furniture for libraries, universities and a variety of public commercial and governmental facilities. By the late 19th century Brunswick became specialists in designing such entertainment furnishings as bars, billiards tables, and bowling alleys for drinking establishments nationwide. Subsequent owners are unknown. The building was acquired by Columbia in 1983 and houses classrooms, academic offices, a computerized newsroom, sciences laboratories, art studios and two public gallery spaces. The building is also home to Anchor Graphics and ShopColumbia, a retail venue that sells the work of Columbia students and alumni artists, musicians, filmmakers etc. exclusively.

=== 624 South Michigan Avenue ===
624 South Michigan Avenue was built by Christian A. Eckstorm in 1908 as an eight-story building to house the Chicago Musical College, a concern headed by Florenz Ziegfeld Sr., father of Ziegfeld Follies producer Florenz Ziegfeld, Jr. A seven-story addition was designed and built in 1922 by Alfred Alschuler. The building was renamed the Blum Building and housed the studios of a dance school and boutique women's clothiers. Tenants in the building in the 1920s included Augustus Eugene Bournique's dancing schools and two select women's clothiers, Stanley Korshak's Blackstone Shop and Blum's Vogue. Brick clad with classical detailing, this 15-story building retains its period marble and brass lobby. Columbia College acquired the building in 1990, and it houses the college's five-story library, classrooms, departmental offices, student and faculty lounges and bookstore.

=== 1104 South Wabash Avenue ===
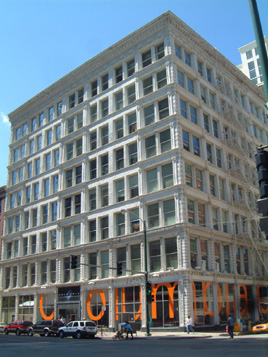
1104 Wabash Campus Building

1104 South Wabash Avenue, built in 1891, is on the City of Chicago Landmarks (1996) and is listed on the National Register of Historic Places (1980). Built by William LeBaron Jenney, acknowledged as the inventor of the skyscraper for his fire-proofed metal skeleton-frame designs, the Ludington Building, as it was historically known, represents his continuing experimentation as the first entirely terra cotta-clad skyscraper. The structure is also a rare survivor, being one of only two extant loft buildings in Chicago built by Jenney.

This eight-story, steel-frame building, boasting one of the finest examples of a terra-cotta clad façade, was commissioned by Mary Ludington Barnes for the American Book Company (1890), which was owned by her husband, Charles Barnes. At the time, Chicago was a national center for the publishing industry, as demonstrated by this building and many others, particularly those on Chicago's Printers Row, and including the former Lakeside Press Building owned by Columbia College. The American Book Company built the building to house its offices, printing presses, packaging and shipping operations. Its frame was built to withstand the weight and vibrations of the presses, which were originally located on the fourth through sixth floors, and to accommodate the anticipated eight-story addition that was never built. Its status as a manufacturing facility determined its form as a loft building, with a practical and efficient interior that had few elegant original elements. Its location, between the Baltimore and Ohio Railroad's Grand Central Station at Harrison and Wells Streets and the Illinois Central Railroad's Central Station at Michigan Avenue and Roosevelt Road, made it ideal for the distribution of the company's products.

The Ludington Building was owned by descendants of its original owners until 1960, although it was occupied by many different tenants, including the Pepsodent toothpaste company in the 1910s and 1920s. In 1960, it was sold to Warshawsky and Company, an autoparts firm, for use as a storage facility. The college purchased the building from Warshawsky in 1999. The Ludington currently houses the school's Center for Book and Paper Arts, the Glass Curtain Gallery and the Conaway Multicultural Center. The majority of the building is used for offices, classrooms and studios of the Department of Cinema and Television Arts. The college's 260-seat state of the art Film Row Cinema theater is located on the 8th floor.

=== Music Department ===
1014–16 South Michigan Avenue was built in 1912 by Christian A. Eckstorm A red brick 4-story building with terra cotta detailing, this structure was erected by a developer as a speculative commercial building. During its first 30 years, it housed offices for a shingle distributor, a lumber company and an electrical parts manufacturer. In 1941, the building was rehabilitated for the Sherwood Conservatory of Music, founded in 1895 by William Hall Sherwood, a piano virtuoso, teacher and composer. The school's most famous alumna may be the comedian Phyllis Diller, who was a piano student at the Sherwood School in the 1930s but did not graduate. The building was acquired by Columbia College Chicago in 2007 and houses the school's music department. The artistic, cultural and performance education tradition of this building, as it was adaptively reused since the 1940s, is continued in the programs of the Music Center of Columbia College.

=== Getz Theater ===
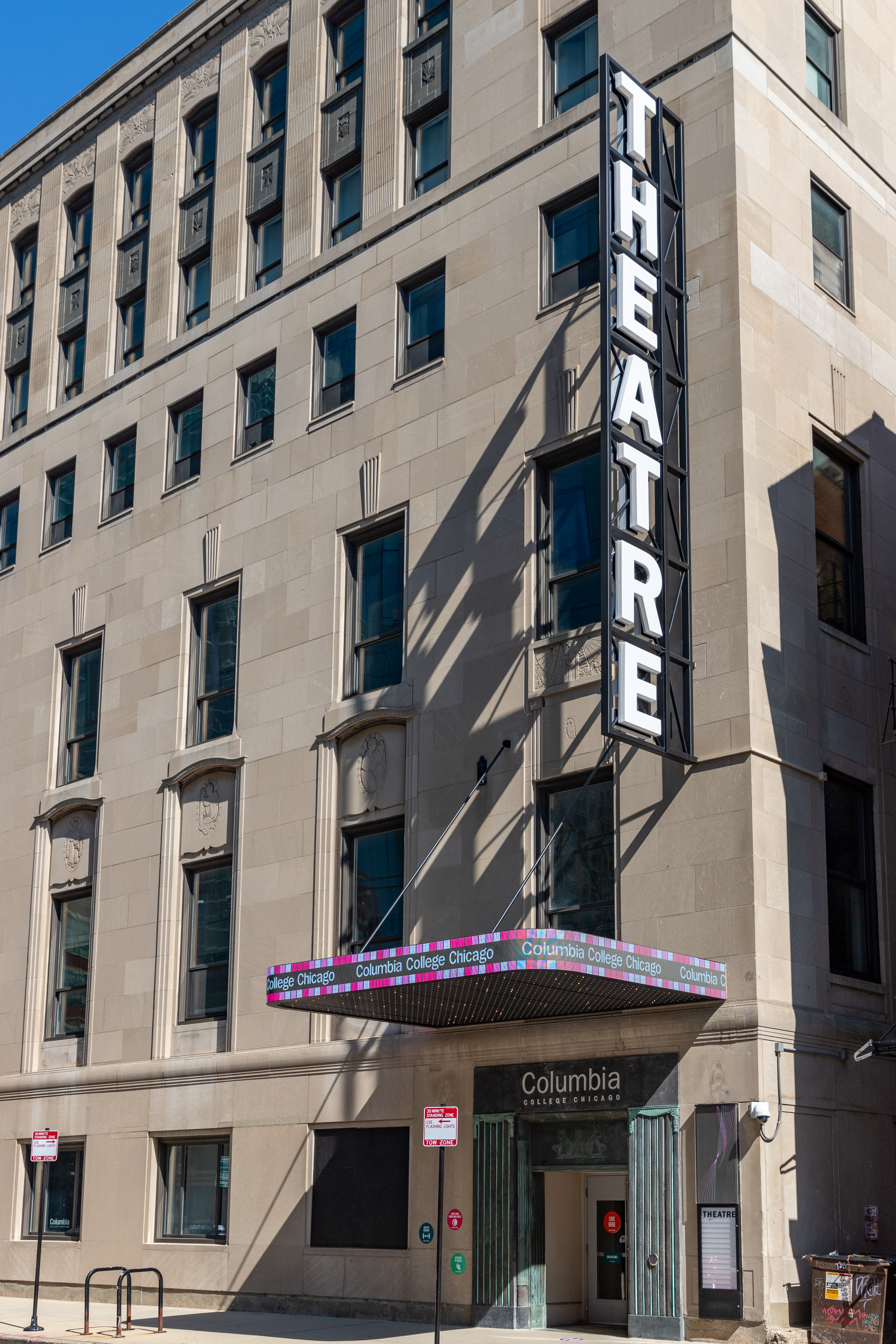
Getz Theater Center

72 East 11th Street was built in 1929 by Holabird & Root, architects of notable Chicago skyscrapers such as the Chicago Board of Trade, the Palmolive Building and the 333 North Michigan Avenue Building. 72 East 11th Street, a six- story, limestone-clad Art Deco building, was originally owned by the Chicago Women's Club and housed the organization's meeting rooms, offices and a theater. Rich in history, it was the site for rallies in support of women's voting rights, efforts on behalf of compulsory education laws and fund raising for scholarships at the School of the Art Institute of Chicago and a women's dormitory at the University of Chicago. Subsequent owners and uses are unknown. Acquired by Columbia in 1980 as the school's Theater Center, it currently houses a renovated 400-seat theater, classrooms, and space for film and photography studios.

=== The Dance Center ===
Ballet room, 1979

The Dance Center of Columbia College Chicago is one of the region's education centers.

Presenting companies have included Merce Cunningham Dance Company, Lucky Plush Productions, Cloud Gate Dance Theater of Taiwan, Koosil-ja/danceKUMIKO, JUMP RHYTHM Jazz Project, Troika Ranch, Wayne McGregor Random Dance, and Hedwig Dances.

1306 S. Michigan Avenue, the Dance Center Building, was built in 1930 by architect Anker S. Graven. This sleek four-story Art Deco building, clad in limestone, was erected as the Paramount Publix Corporation as a film exchange, a venue for the presentation of films to the independent cinema operators throughout the Midwest who could rent them for exhibition at their theaters. The studio occupied the building up to about 1950, when it was taken over by the Equitable Life Assurance Company. In the 1970s it was known as the Seafarers International Union Building. The City of Chicago took possession of it in a tax sale in 1984, and used it for the Health Department's Environmental Health Clinic. The building was acquired by Columbia College in 1999 for use as the school's Dance Center. After extensive interior renovation and adaptation, the Dance Center opened its state-of-the-art educational and public performance facilities in the fall of 2000.

Prior to the relocation to Michigan Avenue, the Dance Center was located at 4730 North Sheridan Road in a former movie theater in the Uptown neighborhood of Chicago. The first floor housed the department office, lobby, dressing rooms, and the "main space", the primary dance studio. The second floor, accessed via a metal staircase in the back of the main space, held the ballet studio, the T'Chi room and music recording rooms.

=== Media Production Center ===
Located at 1600 South State Street, the Media Production Center (MPC) was completed in 2010 and was the college's first new-construction building in its history. Designed by Studio Gang Architects, the 35,500-square-foot facility serves students in the Cinema and Television Arts and Interactive Arts & Media programs. It contains two film production soundstages, a motion-capture studio, digital labs, animating suites, a fabrication shop, and classrooms. It received a 2010 Citation of Merit in the Distinguished Building category from the Chicago chapter of the American Institute of Architects. It has also received LEED Gold certification from the U.S. Green Building Council.

== Environmental record ==
=== Commitments to action on climate change ===
Columbia College Chicago signed onto the American College & University Presidents' Climate Commitment in 2010. The college has met ACUPCC reporting deadlines that included submitting a formal Climate Action Plan and updating their Greenhouse Gas Inventory. The college has yet to set a climate neutrality date with the ACUPCC.

=== Energy profile ===
A Greenhouse Gas (GHG) Inventory was completed in June 2011. The results show total CO_{2} equivalent emissions of 19,381.1 metric tonnes for the baseline year of 2010.

The GHG Inventory was updated in May 2013. The total CO_{2}e emissions were 9,399 metric tonnes for the 2012 fiscal year. This reduction was due in part to the inclusion of purchased Renewable Energy Credits to offset emissions generated from purchased electricity. In conducting the GHG update, new methodologies were employed, emissions from purchased paper were used, and commuting data was collected from a streamlined transit survey.

In 2011, the college hired the company Sustainametrics to complete the college's Sustainability Roadmap. This document was updated in September 2013 to reflect progress made since its initial adoption. The roadmap was submitted to the ACUPCC as the college's official Climate Action Plan.

In 2012, the college decided to consolidate the Recycling Program into a sustainability-based program. The position of Recycling Manager became Sustainability Manager. Other part-time staff from the Recycling Program moved under the Sustainability Manager's direction into this sustainability program. These part-time positions are responsible for maintaining the campus green spaces and managing diversion efforts such as compost and atypical recycling (batteries, technotrash).

Campus recycling and waste collection is coordinated by its janitorial services contractor.

=== Energy investments ===
Columbia College has at least $8 million invested in the oil, gas and coal industry. Ken Gotsch, the former CFO of Columbia, reported that these companies include oil and gas companies Murphy Oil Corporation and Apache Corporation.

== See also ==
- List of colleges and universities in Chicago
- Manifest (urban arts festival)
