= Miriam Schaer =

American artist

- Born: March 21, 1956 (age 69); Buffalo, New York
- Known for: book artist
- Website: miriamschaer.com

Miriam Schaer (born 1956) is an American artist who creates artist books, and installations, prints, collage, photography, and video in relation to artists' books. She also is a teacher of the subject.

== Career ==
Miriam Schaer was born in Buffalo, New York. She did her B.F.A. at the University of the Arts, Philadelphia; the School of Visual Arts, New York; and Boston University; and her M.F.A. at the Transart Institute, Creative Practice, Plymouth University, Plymouth UK.

Schaer explores feminine, social and spiritual issues using books and different materials. Her work has been exhibited and cataloged internationally at venues including at the Brooklyn Public Library, the New Orleans Museum of Art, and the Brooklyn Museum of Art, In 2000, she had a Douglas Library Show at Rutgers University in New Brunswick NJ (the oldest continuously running exhibition showcasing women artists). In 2015, during a conference on "Motherhood and Creative Practice" at London's South Bank University, she exhibited her work in the accompanying exhibition Alternative Maternals. She is the recipient of many prestigious awards including The Soros Arts and Culture Grant, the New York Foundation for the Arts Fellowship, and received a Fulbright to the Republic of Georgia (2017). Her work is included in public collections such as the Yale University Art Museum, the Azerbaijan Museum, in Baku, Azerbaijan; the Tate Gallery, London, England, the Walker Art Center, Minneapolis and in Canada in the Robert McLaughlin Gallery, Oshawa. It has been mentioned in reviews in the New York Times and she is included in the Elizabeth A. Sackler Center for Feminist Art: Feminist Art Base. From 2009 to 2016, she was a senior lecturer at Columbia College Chicago Interdisciplinary Arts, in the Interdisciplinary MFA Program in Book and Paper and in 2006-2010 and 2022, she taught the "Art of the Book" at the Pratt Institute as an assistant professor where she is on the faculty.

== Bibliography ==
- Fattal, Laura Rachel (2013-09-26). "Alterations: The Work of the Altered Book Artist Miriam Schaer" (PDF). Journal of Art for Life. 5 (1).
- Klein, Jennie (2019). "The Mother Without Child / The Child Without Mother: Miriam Schaer's Interrogation of Maternal Ideology, Reproductive Trauma, and Death" in Inappropriate Bodies: Art, Design, and Maternity. Demeter Press. ISBN 9781772582550.
