= School of Business and Entrepreneurship (Columbia College Chicago) =

Academic unit at Columbia College Chicago

Coordinates: 41°52′27″N 87°37′28″W

The School of Business and Entrepreneurship (formerly the Business and Entrepreneurship Department) is the business school of Columbia College Chicago in Chicago, Illinois, United States.

The school offers undergraduate and graduate education in Music Business Management, Live and Performing Arts Management, Media Management, Film Business Management, Sports Management, Visual Arts Management, Arts Management, Design Management, International Arts Management, Marketing, and Advanced Management.

== History ==
The Business & Entrepreneurship Department was established in 1976 to help meet the need for proficient arts administrators, managers and entrepreneurs. Full and part-time faculties as well as visiting guest lecturers are professional practitioners from the arts, entertainment and media fields. The Business & Entrepreneurship Department is staffed by full-time and part-time faculty who are working within the field that they teach. Business & Entrepreneurship is a member of the Association of Arts Administration Educators.

== Programs ==
The Live & Performing Arts Management Concentration leads to professions in legitimate and musical theater, symphonic and chamber orchestras, other music events, opera and dance companies, and concert productions.

The Media Management Concentration leads to professions in Broadcast Media, Related Electronic Media/Film and Print Media among other specialty areas in the media industry.

The Music Business Management Concentration leads to professions in the recording arts and sciences, music publishing, talent management, new media and entrepreneurship.

The Sports Management Concentration leads to professions in the Sports Industry in the fields of audience building, box office management, special events, facilities management, career and talent development, broadcasting and media management, and merchandising.

The Visual Arts Management Concentration offers opportunities in a broad-ranging field that explores 21st century issues and innovation in traditional museums, commercial galleries, and alternative visual arts settings.

== Facilities ==
In the 618 S. Michigan building are housed the departmental offices, faculty offices, conference room, and smart classrooms. In the 624 S. Michigan building are housed computer facilities and additional smart classrooms with smartboards.

== Faculty ==
- Robert Blandford
- Joe Bogdan
- Jerry Brindisi
- Cara Dehnert Huffman
- Mary Filice
- Alexander Fruchter
- Jessica Jacobs
- Dawn Larsen
- Monique Maye
- Philippe Ravanas
- Beth Ryan
- Justin Sinkovich
- Clayton Smith
- Ryan Smith
- Jason Stephens
- Chamille Weddington
- Loren Wells
