= Mirron (Mike) Alexandroff =

American teacher

Mirron Alexandroff
- Born: 1923; Chicago, Illinois, U.S.
- Died: April 20, 2001; Chicago, Illinois, U.S.
- Other names: Mike Alexandroff
- Occupation: President
- Years active: 1961–1992
- Employer: Columbia College
- Known for: 7th President of Columbia College

Mirron Alexandroff (1923 - April 20, 2001) was an American educator and the sixth president of Columbia College Chicago. Succeeding his father, Norman Alexandroff, as the president of the college in 1961, Mirron Alexandroff is highly credited for reinventing the school as a liberal-arts college with a "hands-on minds-on" approach to arts and media education with a progressive social agenda.

Academic offices
Preceded by Norman Alexandroff	President of Columbia College Chicago; 1960 - 1992	Succeeded by John B. Duff
