= Troika Ranch =

Troika Ranch is an American/German performance ensemble. It creates contemporary, hybrid artworks through an ongoing examination of the moving body and its relationship to technology. The company is the collaborative vision of artists Mark Coniglio and Dawn Stoppiello.

== History ==
Established in 1994, and based in Portland, Oregon and Berlin, Germany, Troika Ranch produces live performances, interactive installations and digital films. They combine traditional aspects of these forms with advanced technologies. The artists' mission is to create artwork that best reflects and engages contemporary society.

The name Troika Ranch refers to Coniglio and Stoppiello's creative methodology, which involves a hybrid of three artistic disciplines, dance/theater/media (the Troika), in cooperative interaction (the Ranch). This method preceded the organization, which was formed as a means to support the artists'. During the 1990s, Troika Ranch was among the pioneers in the field that came to be known as Dance and Technology. They performed in festivals and venues internationally and were sought after as guest artists, teachers and lecturers.

In response to the desire in the international arts community to understand this emerging genre, Coniglio and Stoppiello began developing educational programs.

== Education ==
Their public outreach activities include workshops, lectures, online and traditional publications, websites, software and hardware. They conceptualized and invented much of the technology, equipment, and techniques currently in use. Their educational programs have become a significant part of their contribution to the arts.
