= Warrick L. Carter =

Musical educator and executive (1942–2017)

- Born: May 6, 1942; Charlottesville, Virginia, U.S.
- Origin: United States
- Died: July 15, 2017 (aged 75) Sanford, Florida, U.S.
- Occupations: Music educator, Executive, and President of Columbia College Chicago

Warrick L. Carter, PhD (né Warrick Livingston Carter; May 6, 1942 – July 15, 2017) was an American music educator, executive, and president of Columbia College Chicago.

== Early life ==
Warrick Livingston Carter was born May 6, 1942, in Charlottesville, Virginia. Carter and his brothers participated in a choir that his father started and his mother taught piano lessons at home.

== Education ==
He earned a B.S. from Tennessee State University and a master's degree and then a PhD in music education from Michigan State University.

== Career ==
- Alton Park Junior High, teaching instrumental music and band director, 1964.
- University of Maryland, Michigan State University, Assistant professor, Dept. of Music, 1966–67, 1971.
- Governors State University, Coordinator of Music (1971–76), Coordinator of Fine and Performing Arts (1976–79), and Chairman of the Division of Fine and Performing Arts (1976–84)
- Berklee College of Music, 1984–96, Dean of Faculty, Provost and Vice President of Academic Affairs. At Berklee, he began an exchange program with organizations from France, Spain, Italy, Japan, Greece, Israel and Germany.

=== Walt Disney Entertainment ===
From 1996 to 2000 Carter was director of entertainment arts for Walt Disney Entertainment. He managed "internship programs, education and performance opportunities" for college students at all Disney parks. He was responsible for a budget of $40 million.

=== President of Columbia College Chicago ===
Carter was the president of Columbia College Chicago from 2000 to 2013. He was the first African-American president of the college. During his tenure, Columbia College became "the South Loop's largest nongovernmental property owner", the first new building construction in the history of the college occurred, a $100 million fundraising campaign began and enrollment rose by 25% to a peak of 12,500.

After 2008, enrollment began to decline. In March 2012, in the midst of falling enrollment rates and pressure to lower tuition costs, during a State of the College address a homeless student brought into question Carter's six-figure salary to which Carter replied, "Don't blame me because you are [homeless] [...] I am very sorry you are homeless. We will do everything we can to support you. We will do what we can. Our tuition has to be based on what our expenses are. My salary has nothing to do with it." In 2012 to address budget issues, Carter proposed ending cinema studies within the film and video departments saying, "The department should carefully consider the ongoing role of Cinema Studies, including the possibility of eliminating it. Although I understand the department's argument for retaining it as a generalist degree, I remain skeptical of its value to student learning and to the department." By July he had decided to maintain the program.

The Chicago Jazz Ensemble and the Center for Black Music Research were considered for closure during this same time period. Carter was quoted by the Chicago Tribune about the potential closures, "[The Chicago Jazz Ensemble] had been an integral part of the music department upon its founding, but it had kind of moved away from the department over the years. So clearly what we're saying is that whatever dollars we spend on any of these institutes or centers are tuition dollars, so students should be able to take advantage and/or benefit from their presence here on campus ... And one of the ways that I thought would be best to do that would be to make them more closely related to the centers by placing them … within the instructional program."

Carter retired in 2013, a year before his contract expired. He died on July 15, aged 75, in Sanford, Florida, after a brief illness.

== Awards ==
- International Jazz Educators Hall of Fame, 1996.
- National Black Music Caucus Achievement Award, 1997
