= Mary A. Blood =

American oratory educator (1851–1927)

Mary Ann Blood
- Born: July 10, 1851; Hollis, New Hampshire
- Died: July 25, 1927 (aged 76); Chicago, Illinois
- Education: Monroe College of Oratory
- Occupations: Professor and President of Columbia School of Oratory
- Years active: 1887-1927
- Known for: Co-Founder of Columbia School of Oratory

Mary Ann Blood (July 10, 1851 – July 25, 1927) was a teacher of elocution and expression in the late 19th and early 20th centuries. She was the co-founder and first co-president of Columbia College Chicago.

== Biography ==
Blood was born on July 10, 1851, to Isaac Pierce and Sarah (née Fisk) Blood in Hollis, New Hampshire. She attended Framingham Normal School in Massachusetts (later Framingham State University), graduated in 1871, then took post-graduate advanced classes and completed her course of study in 1873. Normal schools trained students to be teachers.

She moved to the Jamaica Plain area of Boston in 1873 to teach at the Eliot School, founded in 1676. During the 1870s and 1880s, the school began its “manual training” era where classes such as drawing, painting, sewing, and cooking were added to the curriculum. Its purpose was to “satisfy that instinctive desire of human beings to create.”

In 1880, she attended Monroe College of Oratory (which became Emerson College), in Boston, studying under Charles Wesley Emerson, its founder, where she earned a degree in oratory in 1882 and became a member of its faculty in 1883. During her tenure at Monroe, Mary taught analysis, practical hygiene, rendering, & Bible reading and also administered the Normal Department. Additionally, she served as a member of the school’s board of trustees from 1887 until she left the school in 1890.

During her tenure at Monroe, Blood accepted an assignment to teach elocution and expression courses at the State Agricultural College in Ames, Iowa, from 1887 to 1888. It was here she meet fellow teacher, Ida Morey Riley.

== Co-Founder of Columbia School of Oratory ==
Mary Blood and Ida Riley left New England to establish Columbia School of Oratory (now Columbia College Chicago) in Chicago, Illinois in 1890 where the “Emerson System of Physical Culture” was taught. Anticipating a strong need for public speaking at the 1893 World's Columbian Exposition, which celebrated the 400th anniversary of Christopher Columbus's arrival in the Americas, Blood and Riley were inspired to open their school in the exposition city, Chicago, and adopt the exposition's name.

Ida Riley died in 1901 and the school changed its name to Columbia College of Expression in 1905. The college added variety to its coursework and by the 1920s, the school was recognized by the State Examining Board of Illinois and the examining boards of other states, with men and women holding degrees from the college qualified to teach any branch of English, correlated speech arts, and dramatics in the schools without examination. Also, coursework at the school was accredited by the Chicago Board of Education. It also offered a course of study to train students for the Chautauqua traveling lecture circuit. These public lectures became a popular form of entertainment and the college offered training courses for those who wished to become a lecturer or performer on the circuit.

She also remained active in the National Association of Elocutionists, the Woman’s Christian Temperance Union, and local community groups.

== Death ==
She died July 25, 1927, at the college she founded. On July 27 funeral services were held at the school, 120 E. Pearson Street, and many of its alumni were present. She is buried in Hollis, New Hampshire, and her epitaph reads “She was one of the founders and for 37 years the president of the Columbia College of Expression in Chicago, Illinois”.

Academic offices
Preceded by None	Co President of Columbia College Chicago; 1890 - 1901	Succeeded by Mary A. Blood

Academic offices
Preceded by Ida Morey Riley	President of Columbia College Chicago; 1901 - July 25, 1927	Succeeded by George L. Scherger
