= National Association of State Park Directors =

National Association of State Park Directors is an organization dedicated to the preservation of state parks in the United States.
