= The Arc at Old Colony =

Apartment building in Chicago, Illinois

- U.S. National Register of Historic Places
- U.S. National Historic Landmark District – Contributing property
- Chicago Landmark
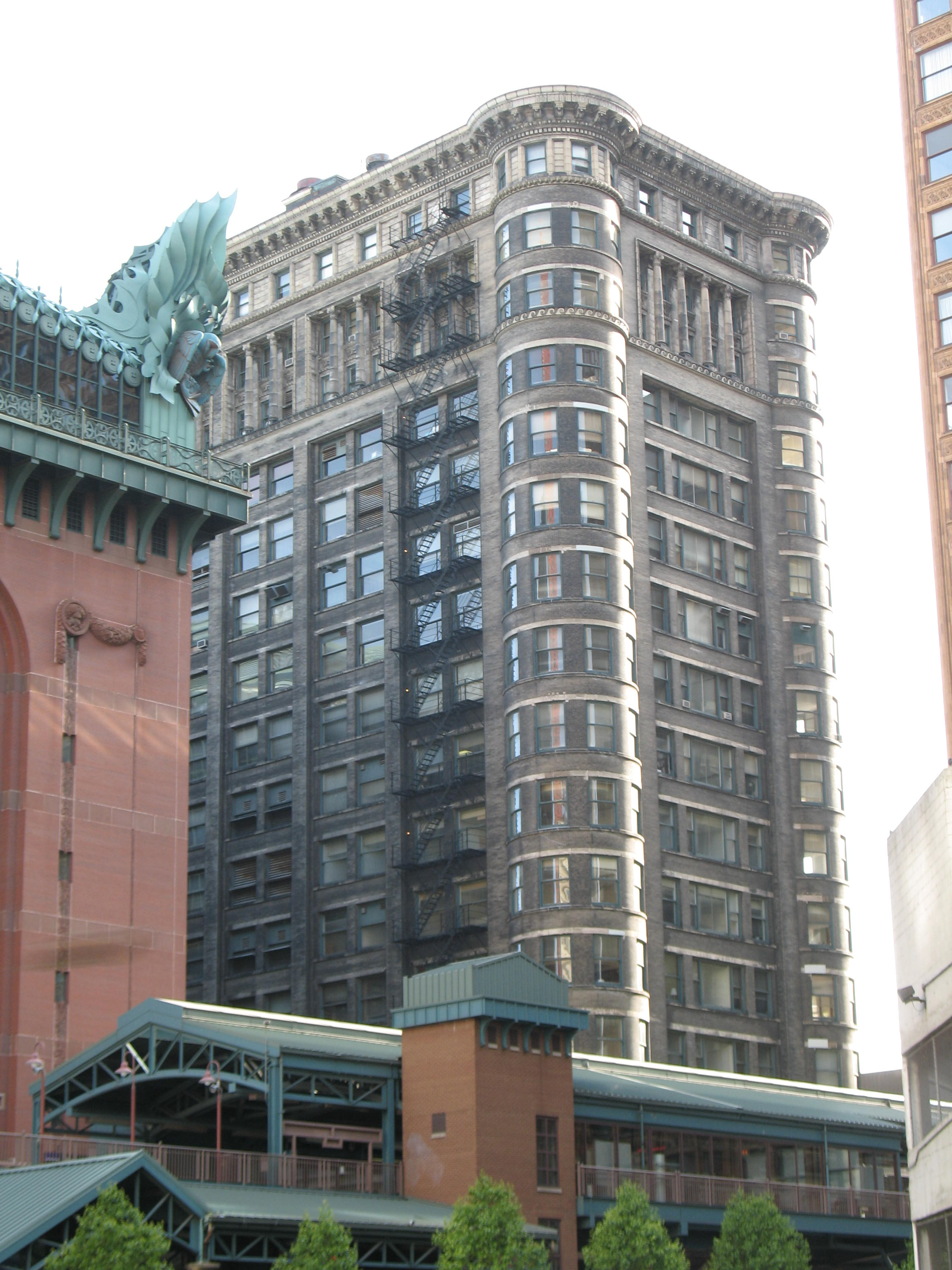

- Location within Chicago metropolitan area Location within Illinois Location within the United States
- Location: Chicago, IL
- Coordinates: 41°52′35.78″N 87°37′44.34″W
- Built: 1893
- Architect: Holabird & Roche
- Architectural style: Chicago
- Part of: South Dearborn Street – Printing House Row North Historic District (ID76000705)
- NRHP reference No.: 76000701

Significant dates
- Added to NRHP: January 2, 1976
- Designated CHICL: July 7, 1978

The Arc at Old Colony (Old Colony Building until 2015) is a 17-story landmark building in the Chicago Loop community area of Chicago, Illinois. Designed by the architectural firm Holabird & Roche in 1893–94, it stands at approximately 215 feet (65.5 m) and was one of the tallest building in Chicago at the time it was completed. The building was designated a Chicago Landmark on July 7, 1978. It was the first tall building to use a system of internal portal arches as a means of bracing the structure against high winds.

The building was added to the National Register of Historic Places in 1976. It is directly across the street to the west of the Harold Washington Library. The address of the Old Colony Building is 407 S. Dearborn Street.

Built as an office building, the Old Colony was converted to an apartment building in 2015. The building was fully remodeled and modernized upon the opening of the apartments, providing residents with amenities, public areas, and contemporary designs. The units are marketed to college students attending school in the South Loop.

The exterior of the building was used to represent the offices of the Independent News Service in the television series Kolchak The Night Stalker.

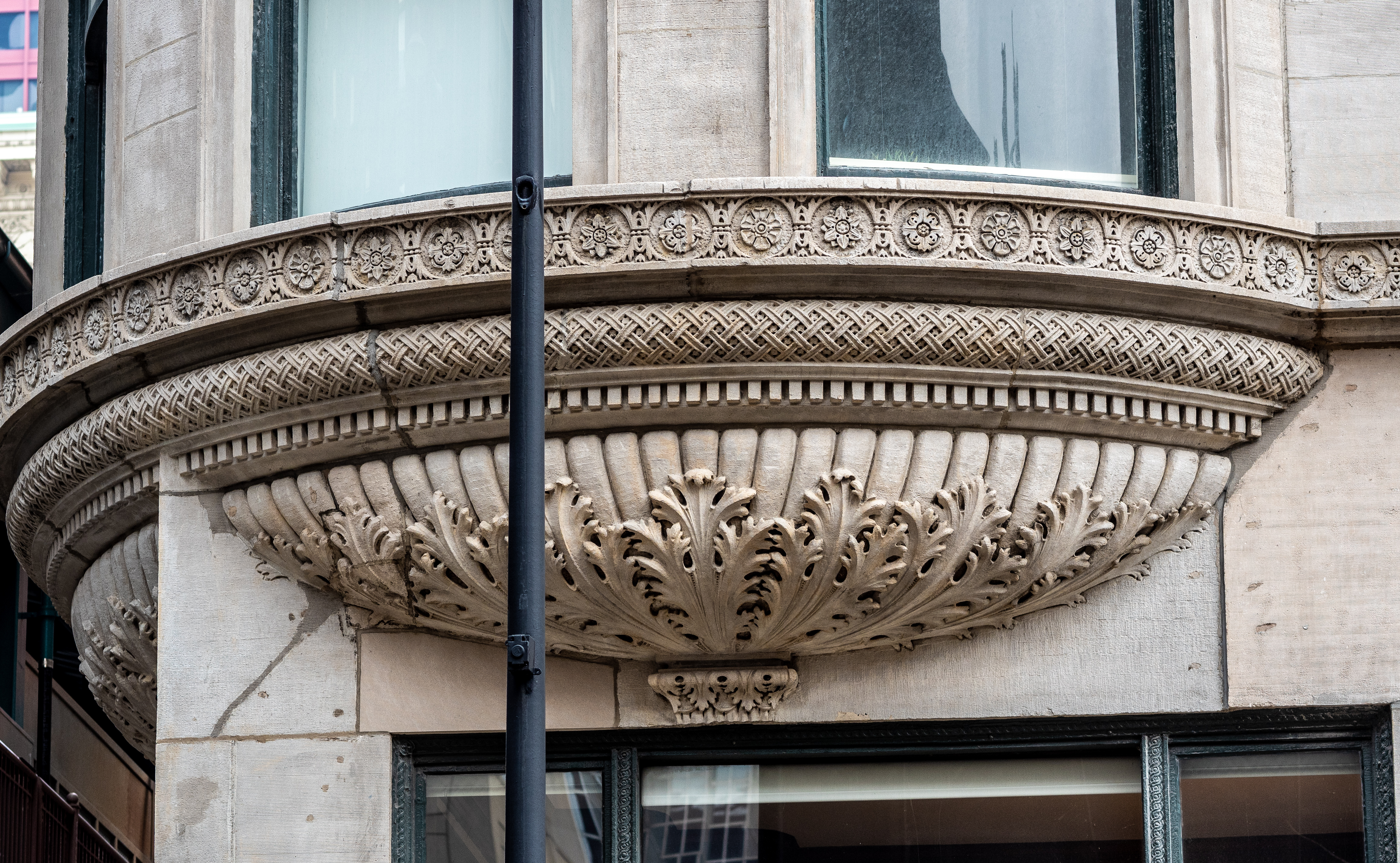
Window Detail

== See also ==
- National Register of Historic Places listings in Central Chicago
