= Ludington Building =

- U.S. National Register of Historic Places
- Chicago Landmark
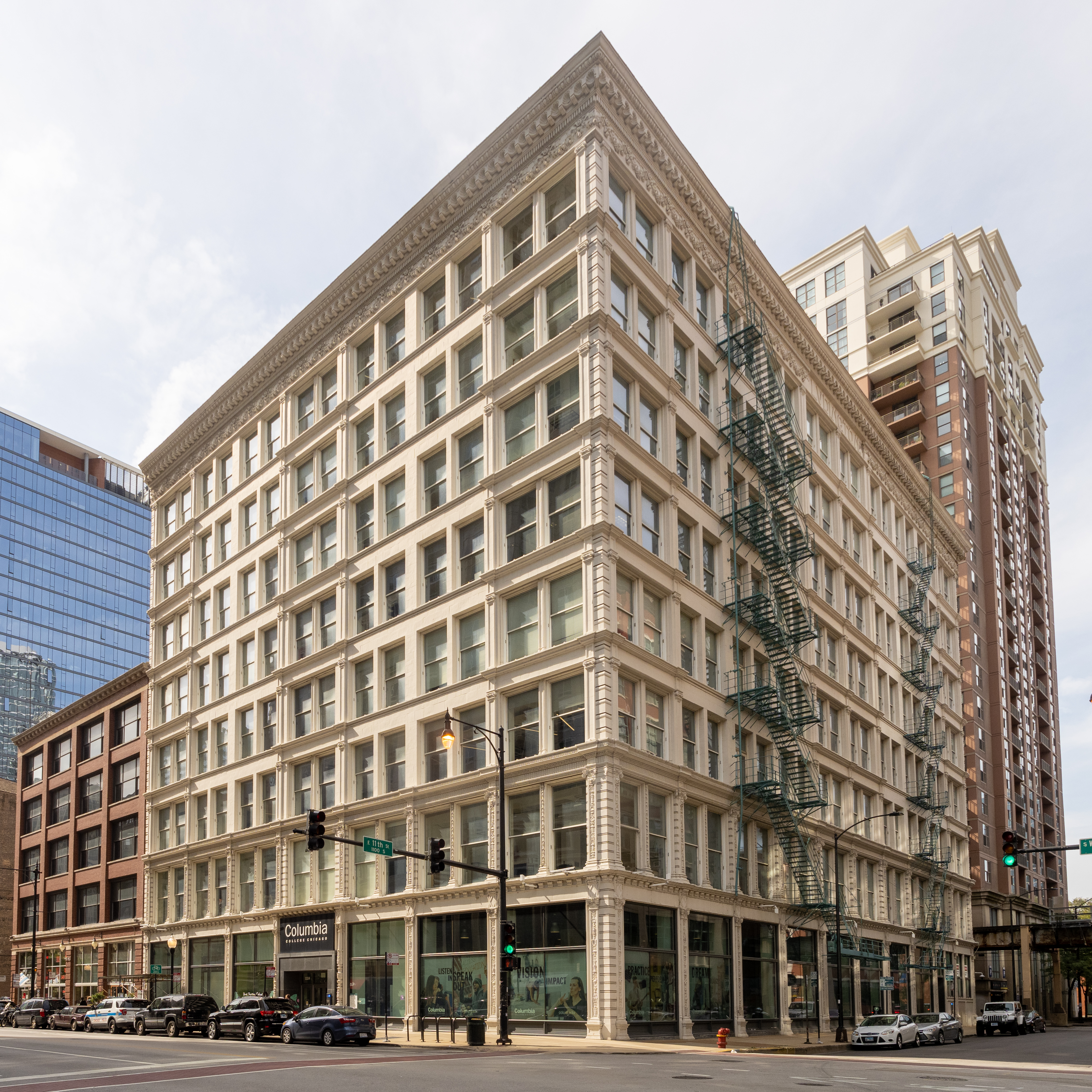

- Location within Chicago metropolitan area
- Location: 1104 South Wabash Avenue, Chicago, IL
- Coordinates: 41°52′8.14″N 87°37′34.83″W
- Built: 1892
- Architect: Jenney & Mundie
- Architectural style: Chicago
- NRHP reference No.: 80001347

Significant dates
- Added to NRHP: May 8, 1980
- Designated CHICL: June 10, 1996

The Ludington Building in Chicago, Illinois is a steel-frame building that is the oldest surviving structure of its kind in the city. It is located in the Chicago Loop community area. It was designed by William Le Baron Jenney and was named a Chicago Landmark on June 10, 1996. It was added to the National Register of Historic Places on May 8, 1980. The Ludington Building "was commissioned by Mary Ludington Barnes for the American Book Company"; presently it is one of twenty buildings that comprise the campus of Columbia College Chicago.
