= Grand Lodge of Illinois =

Fraternal organization in Illinois, United States

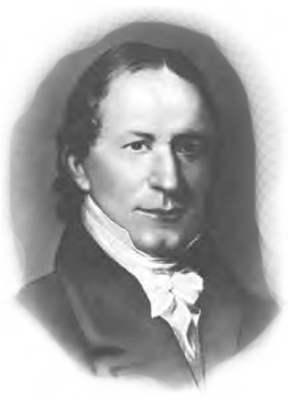
- Past Grand Master Shadrach Bond
- Established: 1822 (first Grand Lodge), 1840 (current Grand Lodge)
- Location: United States
- Coordinates: 39.7654903°N 89.6239377°W
- Grand Master: Joseph B Ferrell
- Website: ilmason.org

The Grand Lodge of Illinois, officially The Most Worshipful Grand Lodge of Ancient Free and Accepted Masons of the State of Illinois, is the premier masonic organization in the state of Illinois encompassing more than 460 lodges and 57,000 members at the end of 2018.

== History ==
The first masonic lodge in the state of Illinois was formed in Kaskaskia. The members submitted a petition to the Grand Lodge of Pennsylvania on 1805.

The first Grand Lodge of Illinois was organized in 1822, with Shadrach Bond, the state's first governor, serving as its first Grand Master. The organization ceased operations in 1827, during a period of widespread anti-Masonic sentiment in the United States. Although some individual lodges may have continued operating for a time, Illinois no longer had a functioning Grand Lodge; the Grand Lodge's own history states that Western Star Lodge, one of the state's earliest lodges, probably ceased to exist sometime between 1829 and 1835.

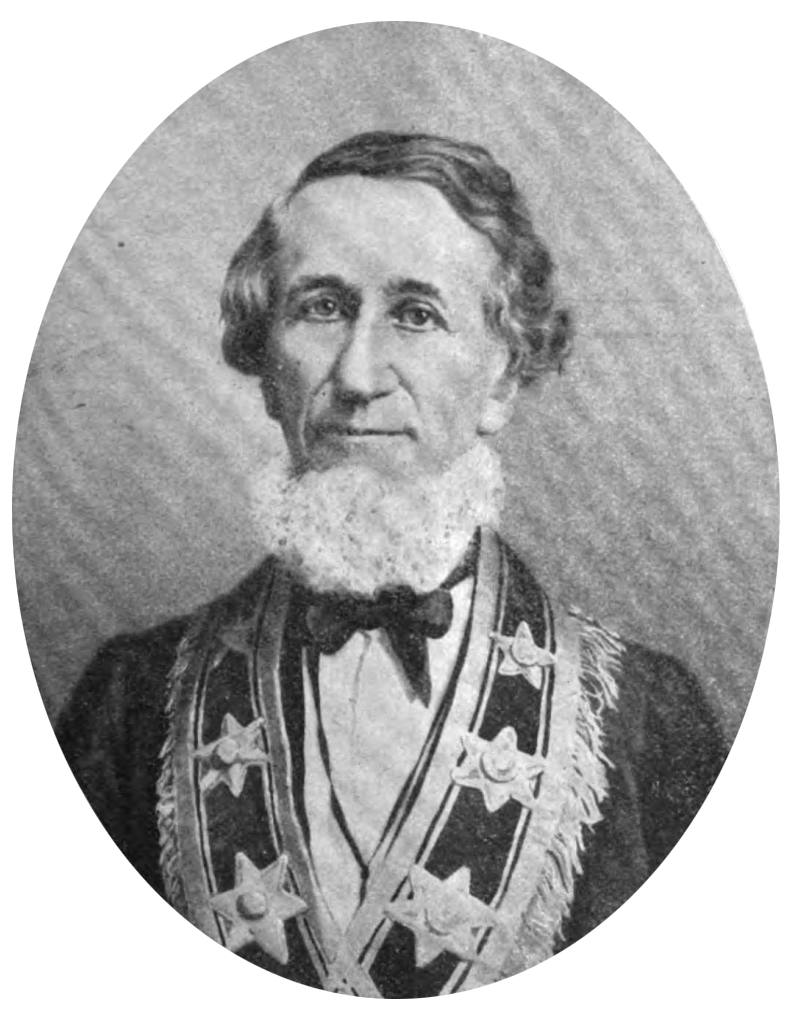
Abraham Jonas, first Grand Master of the present Grand Lodge of Illinois, organized in 1840

As anti-Masonic sentiment declined, Freemasonry began to revive in Illinois during the late 1830s. Because there was no functioning Illinois Grand Lodge, newly organized lodges received authority from neighboring jurisdictions, including the grand lodges of Kentucky and Missouri. Representatives of several Illinois lodges met at Jacksonville in January 1840 to consider forming a new Grand Lodge, and reconvened there on April 6, 1840.

On April 6, 1840, the delegates adopted a constitution and bylaws, selected Jacksonville as the seat of the Grand Lodge, and elected Abraham Jonas Grand Master. The present Grand Lodge of Illinois dates its formation to this April 6, 1840 meeting in Jacksonville, rather than treating the organization established in 1822 as having operated continuously.

== See also ==
- Masonic Temple (Chicago) Former Masonic building in Illinois
- Paul Revere Masonic Temple Former Masonic building in Illinois
- Jefferson Masonic Temple Masonic building in Illinois
- List of famous Freemasons
- List of Masonic Grand Lodges United States
- History of Masonic Grand Lodges in North America
