= Jefferson Masonic Temple =

Building in Chicago, Illinois, United States

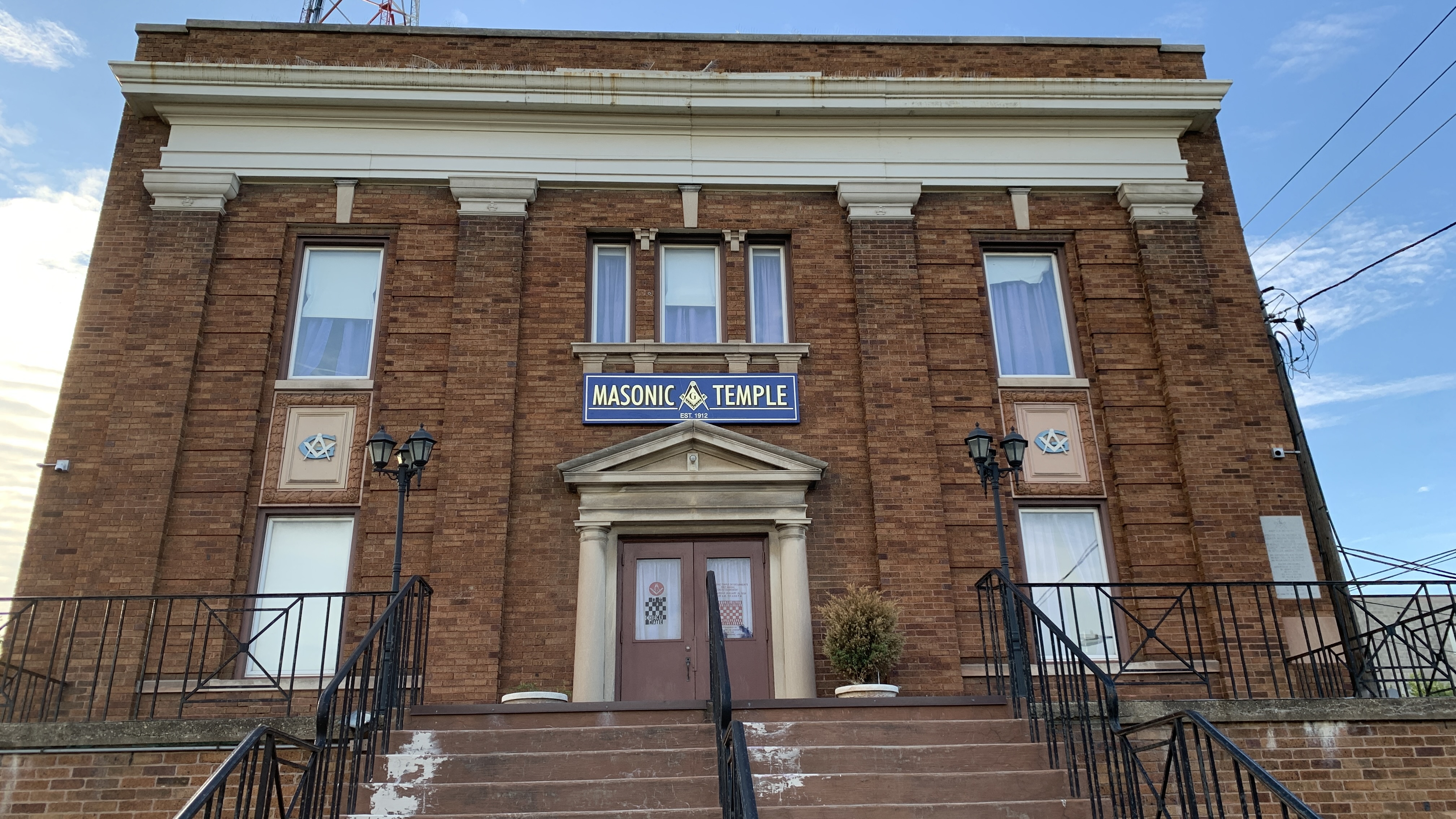
- Jefferson Masonic Temple
- Alternative names: Jefferson Masonic Association

General information
- Status: Active
- Type: Masonic temple
- Location: Jefferson Park, Chicago, Illinois, United States, 5418 West Gale Street, Chicago, Illinois 60630, Chicago, United States
- Coordinates: 41.970561°N 87.766304°W
- Completed: 1913
- Inaugurated: January 31, 1913
- Cost: $17,755
- Client: Jefferson Masonic Association
- Affiliation: Freemasonry

Design and construction
- Other designers: William D. Price (building scheme)
- Main contractor: George M. Hayes

Other information
- Public transit: Jefferson Park station (CTA Blue Line and bus terminal)

Website
- jeffersonmasonicassociation.com

Jefferson Masonic Temple is a building completed in 1913 in Jefferson Park, it provides a meeting space for Masonic Lodges and appendant bodies in the 5th Northeastern District of the Grand Lodge Of Illinois: Oriental Lodge #33, Hesperia #411, King Oscar Lodge #855, Paul Revere Lodge #998, and Kelvyn Park-Willing Lodge #1075.

In 1913, the Wiley M. Providence Lodge formed the Jefferson Masonic Association and built their new temple. Jefferson Masonic Association now maintains the Jefferson Masonic Temple.

== See also ==
- Masonic Temple (Chicago) Former Masonic buildings in Illinois
- Paul Revere Masonic Temple Former Masonic buildings in Illinois
- Masonic Landmarks ancient and unchangeable principles or precepts of Freemasonry
- Tracing board illustrations depicting the various emblems and symbols used by Freemasons
- Evanston Masonic Temple Masonic building in Illinois
