= Heritage Tower =

Heritage Tower may refer to:

- Tower Hotel (Niagara Falls)
- Heritage Tower (Battle Creek, Michigan)
