= Evanston Masonic Temple =

Building in Chicago, Illinois, United States

- Evanston Masonic Temple in 2026
- Alternative names: The Temple Lofts

General information
- Status: Converted to residential use
- Type: Former Masonic temple
- Architectural style: Classical Revival
- Location: 1453 Maple Avenue, Evanston, Illinois, United States
- Coordinates: 42.0443753°N 87.6872771°W
- Completed: 1926
- Affiliation: Freemasonry (original use)

Technical details
- Material: Stone

Design and construction
- Architect: John Augur Holabird
- Architecture firm: Holabird & Roche
- Designations: City of Evanston landmark

The Evanston Masonic Temple is a former Masonic Temple in Evanston, Illinois constructed in 1926. In November 2022, the building was approved for residential redevelopment. The building reopened as Temple Lofts in 2025.

== See also ==
- Masonic Temple (Chicago)
- Jefferson Masonic Temple
- Paul Revere Masonic Temple
