= Paul Revere Masonic Temple =

Former Masonic building in Chicago, Illinois

- Former names: Ravenswood Club House; Truc Lam Buddhist Temple
- Alternative names: The Gardner School

General information
- Status: Demolished
- Type: Originally a residence; later a social club, Masonic temple and Buddhist temple
- Location: Ravenswood, Chicago, Illinois, United States, 1521 West Wilson Avenue, Chicago, Illinois, Chicago, United States
- Coordinates: 41.9650588°N 87.7039265°W
- Completed: Between 1880 and 1885
- Demolished: 2020
- Affiliation: Freemasonry (1920–2006)

Technical details
- Structural system: Wood-frame construction
- Material: Wood
- Floor count: 2
- Floor area: 14,000 sq ft

The Paul Revere Masonic Temple originated as a private residence constructed sometime between 1880 and 1885 at 1521 West Wilson Avenue in Chicago, Illinois.

In 1899 became the Ravenswood Chicago Women's Club with an addition later. The building had seven bedrooms, two meeting rooms, reception hall, dance floor and sitting room; billiards, bowling alley; a large front porch and a large lawn on the Ashland Avenue side.

The building was acquired from the Illinois Commandery #72, Grand Commandery of Knights Templar of the State of Illinois.

The founders of Paul Revere Lodge, Walter S. Hutchins, F.W. (Ted) Bainbridge, Walter White, Sr. and Frank Polhamis were members of the Episcopal church in Uptown, Chicago. Brothers Hutchins and Polhamis worked in the insurance industry. Brother Bainbridge worked at Commonwealth Edison Company. Brother White worked at Marshall Field's and Company.

In 1926, extensive repairs were recommended by the architectural firm Holabird & Root.

In 1929, the lodge had nearly 700 members before the Great Depression, which brought economic devastation, and by 1932 the membership declined.

The following years, three lodges merged into Paul Revere Lodge: Legion Lodge No. 1037 on December 20, 1967 then Edgewater Lodge No. 901 on November 15, 1969, and Casimir Pulaski Lodge No. 1167 on September 15, 1993.

In 2004, the Commission on Chicago Landmarks found it worthy of preservations and approved the Landmark designation but the owners at that time opposed to it.

In 2006 became the Vietnamese Buddhist Chùa Trúc Lâm Temple, but in 2017 it was listed for sale.

In 2020 it was demolished after Preservation Chicago could not find a buyer.

In 2021 a new building opened as The Gardner School with a new address number 1525 in the same street.

== See also ==
- Masonic Temple (Chicago) Former Masonic building in Illinois
- Jefferson Masonic Temple Masonic building in Illinois
- Evanston Masonic Temple Masonic building in Illinois
