= Casement window =

Window that is attached to its frame by one or more hinges

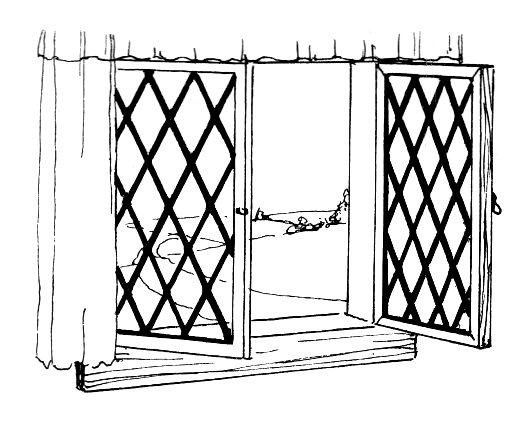
Casement window, with latticed lights

A casement window is a window that is attached to its frame by one or more hinges at the side. They are used singly or in pairs within a common frame, in which case they are hinged on the outside. Casement windows are often held open using a casement stay. Windows hinged at the top are referred to as awning windows, and ones hinged at the bottom are called hoppers.

== Overview ==
Parts of a casement cross-window, viewed from the outside

Throughout Britain and Ireland, casement windows were common before the sash window was introduced. They were usually metal with leaded glass, which refers to glass panes held in place with strips of lead called cames (leaded glass should not be confused with lead glass, which refers to the manufacture of the glass itself).

These casement windows usually were hinged on the side, and opened inward.

By the start of the Victorian era, opening casements and frames were constructed from timber in their entirety. The windows were covered by functional exterior shutters, which opened outward. Variants of casement windows are the norm in many European countries.

They are sometimes opened with a crank, lever, or cam handle, which is placed around hand height or at the bottom and serves as a window lock. A crank, stay, or friction hinge is necessary when the window opens outward, to hold the window in position despite wind.

Often, the glass panes are set in a rabbeted frame and sealed with beveled putty or glazing compound to secure the glass.

The hinging of casement windows is referred to using the following abbreviations: FCL refers to a left-handed window, where the hinges are located on the left and the locking mechanism is on the right. FCR is a right-handed window with the hinges on the right and the locking mechanism on the left. These definitions apply to a window when looking at it from the exterior ("from curb" or FC). In some countries architectural diagrams of casement windows show a dashed triangle with the hinged side identified by the point of the triangle (e.g. USA), while in others they point to the lever, showing a simplified perspective of the opened window (e.g. Hungary, Germany). Furthermore, in some countries (e.g. Hungary, Germany) diagrams also make distinction between windows opening inwards (dashed line) or outwards (solid line). FCL windows feature a triangle pointing to the left; FCR windows have a triangle pointing to the right.

== Energy efficiency and natural ventilation ==
Casement windows, including awning and hopper types, "generally have lower air leakage rates than sliding windows because the sash closes by pressing against the frame."

Casement windows are also excellent for natural ventilation strategies, especially in hot climates. Casements allow more control of ventilation than flush-opening windows. They can be hinged to open outward and angled in order to direct breezes into the building.

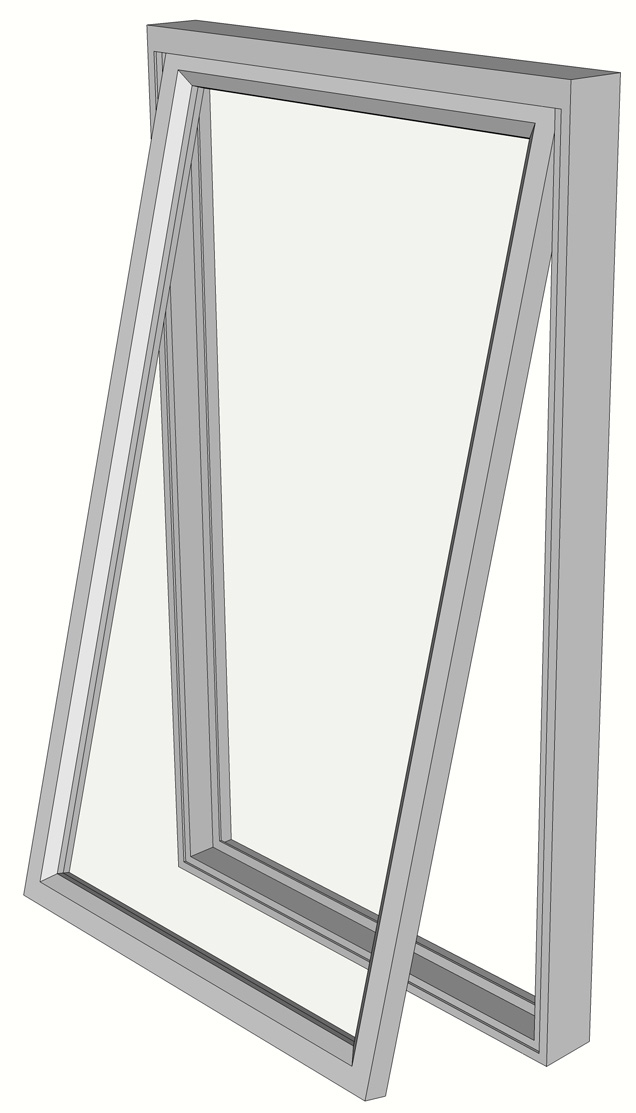
Hinged at the top: awning window

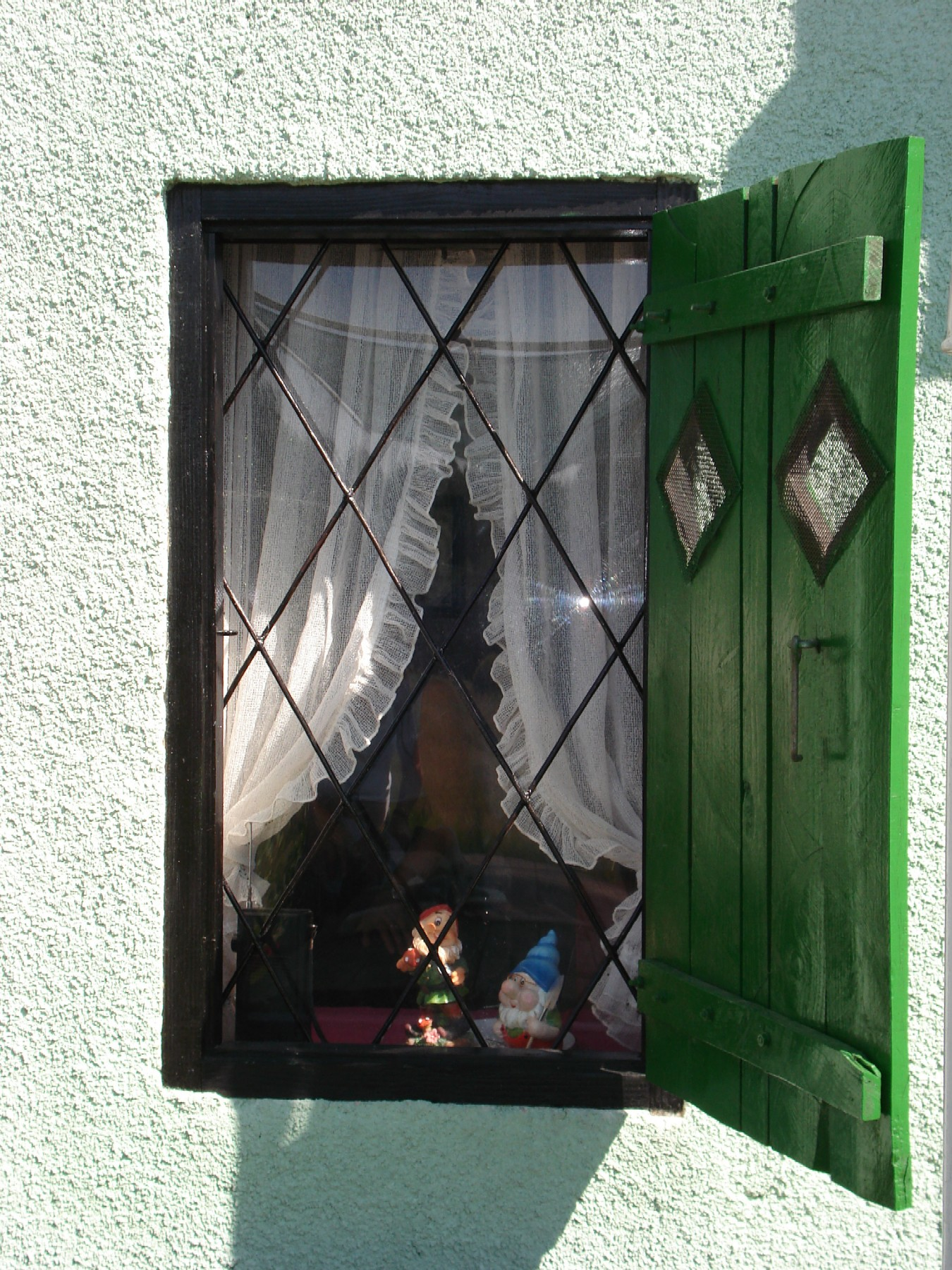
Out-swinging shutter, in-swinging window

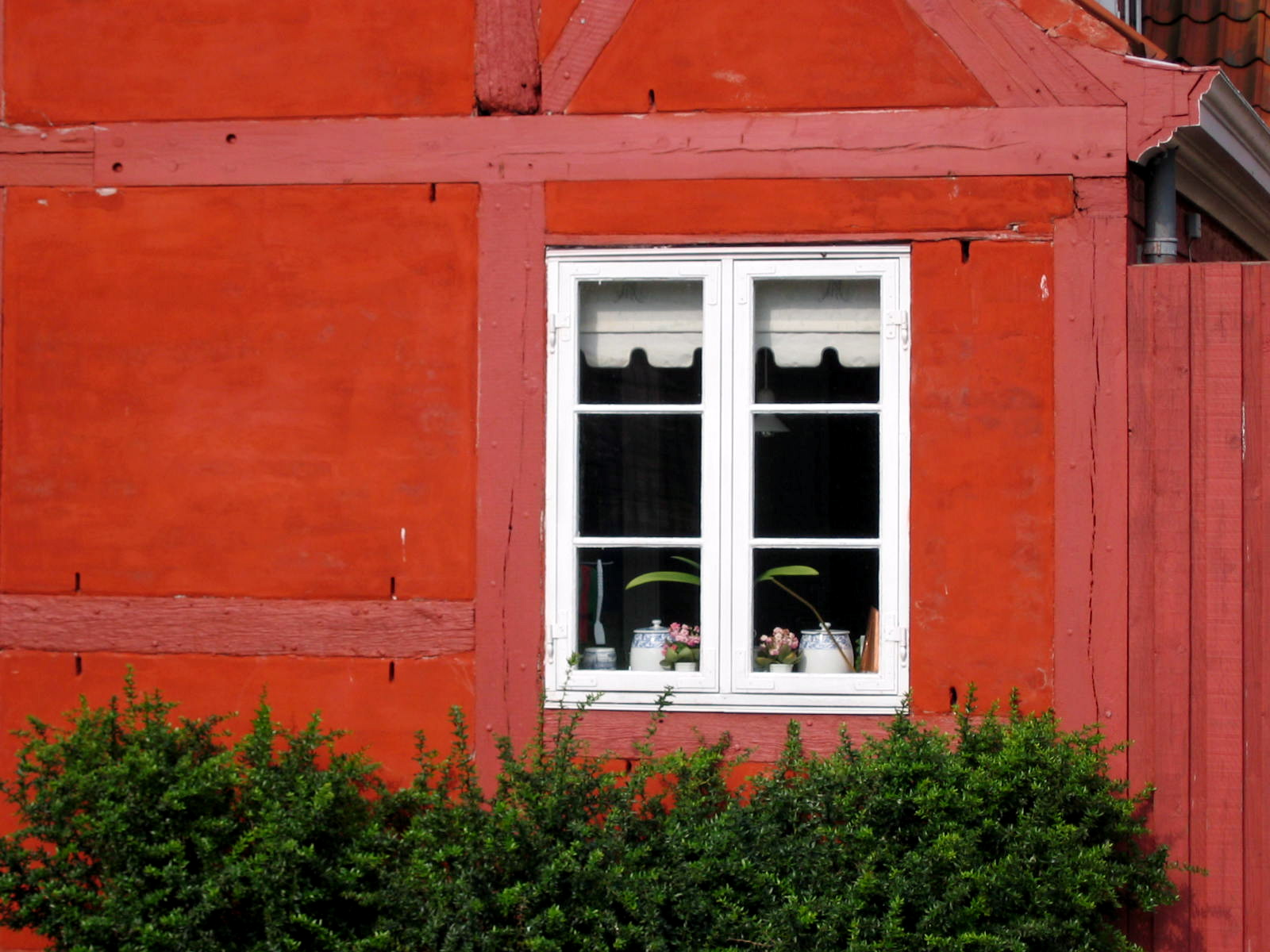
Danish casement window

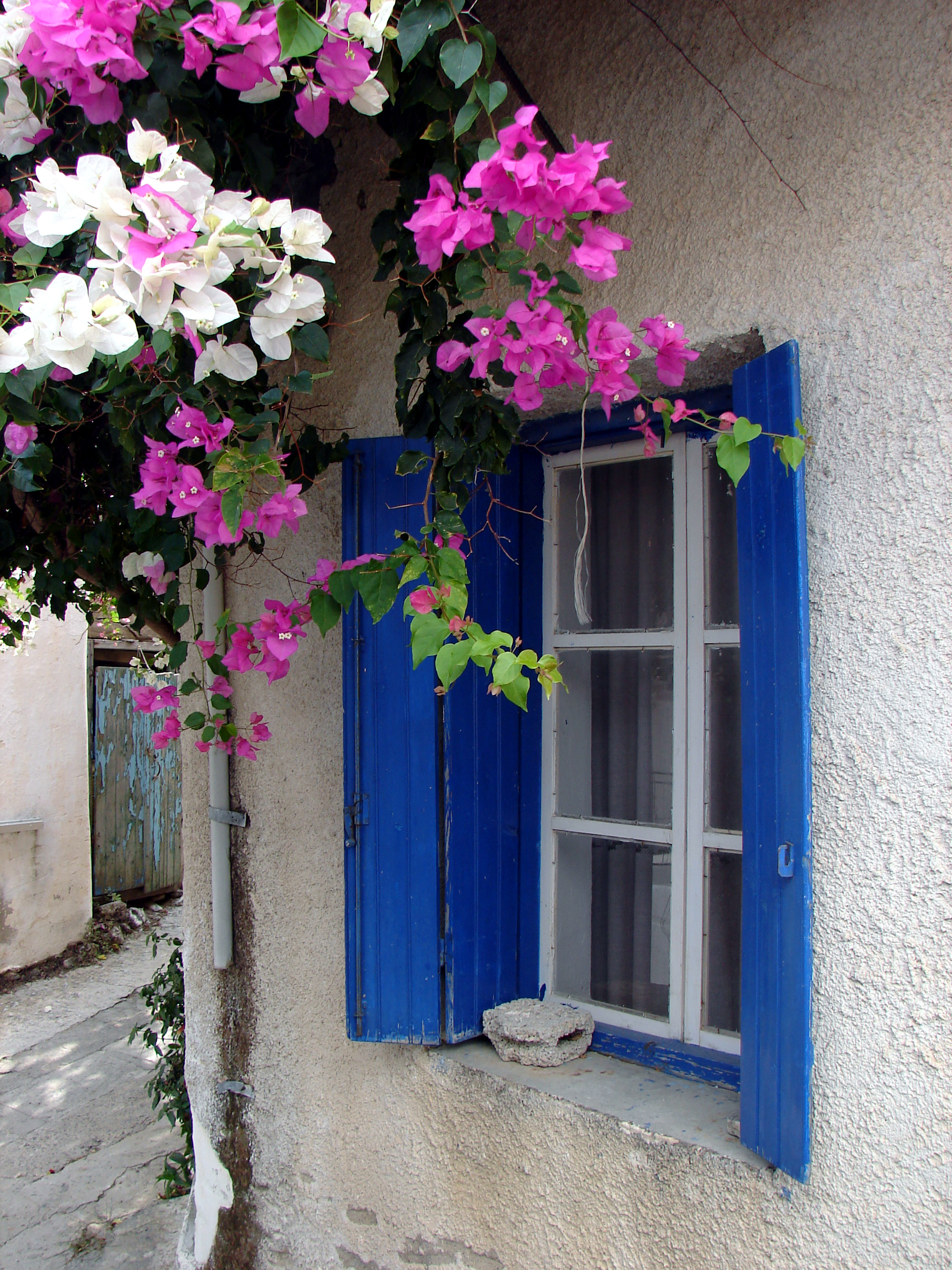
Casement window on Crete

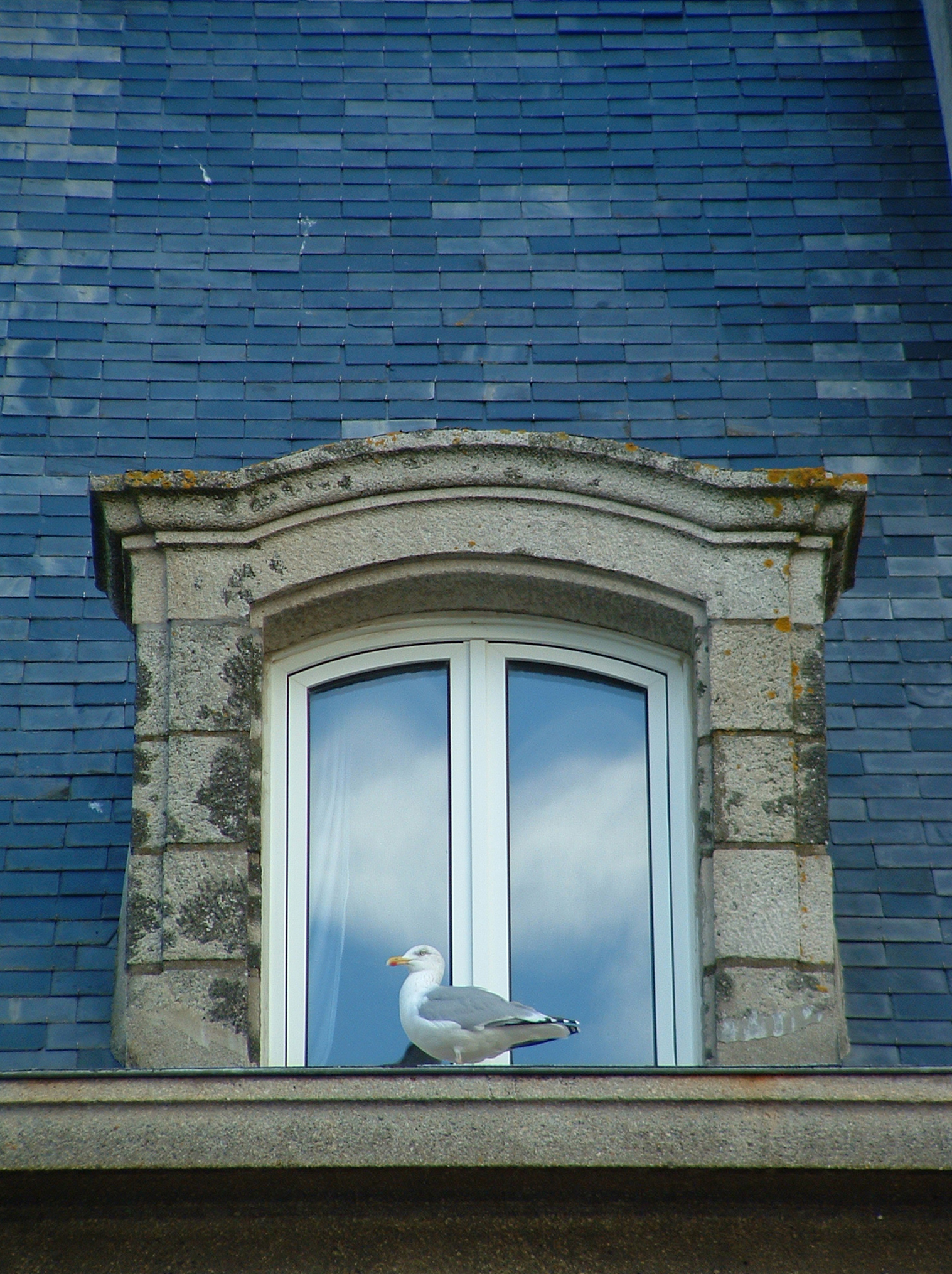
St. Malo

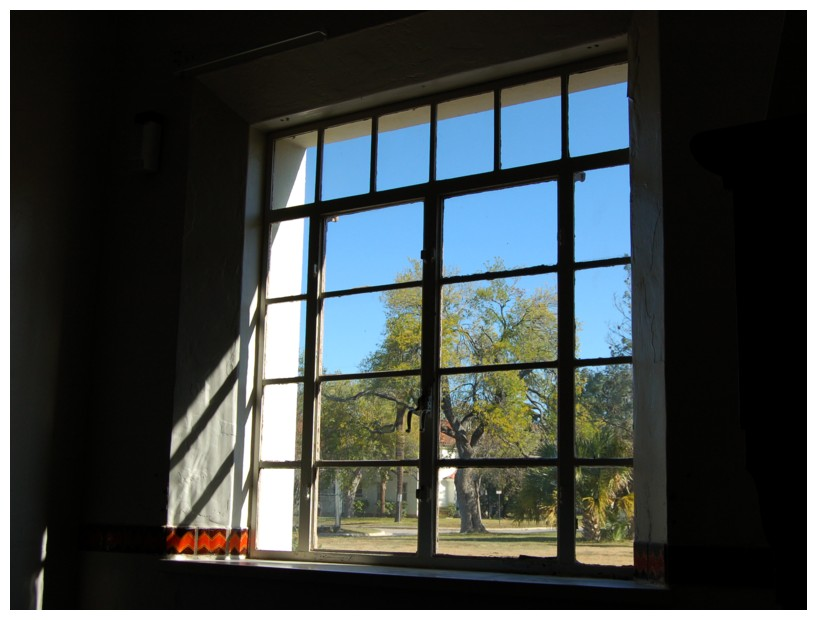
Fort Sam Houston

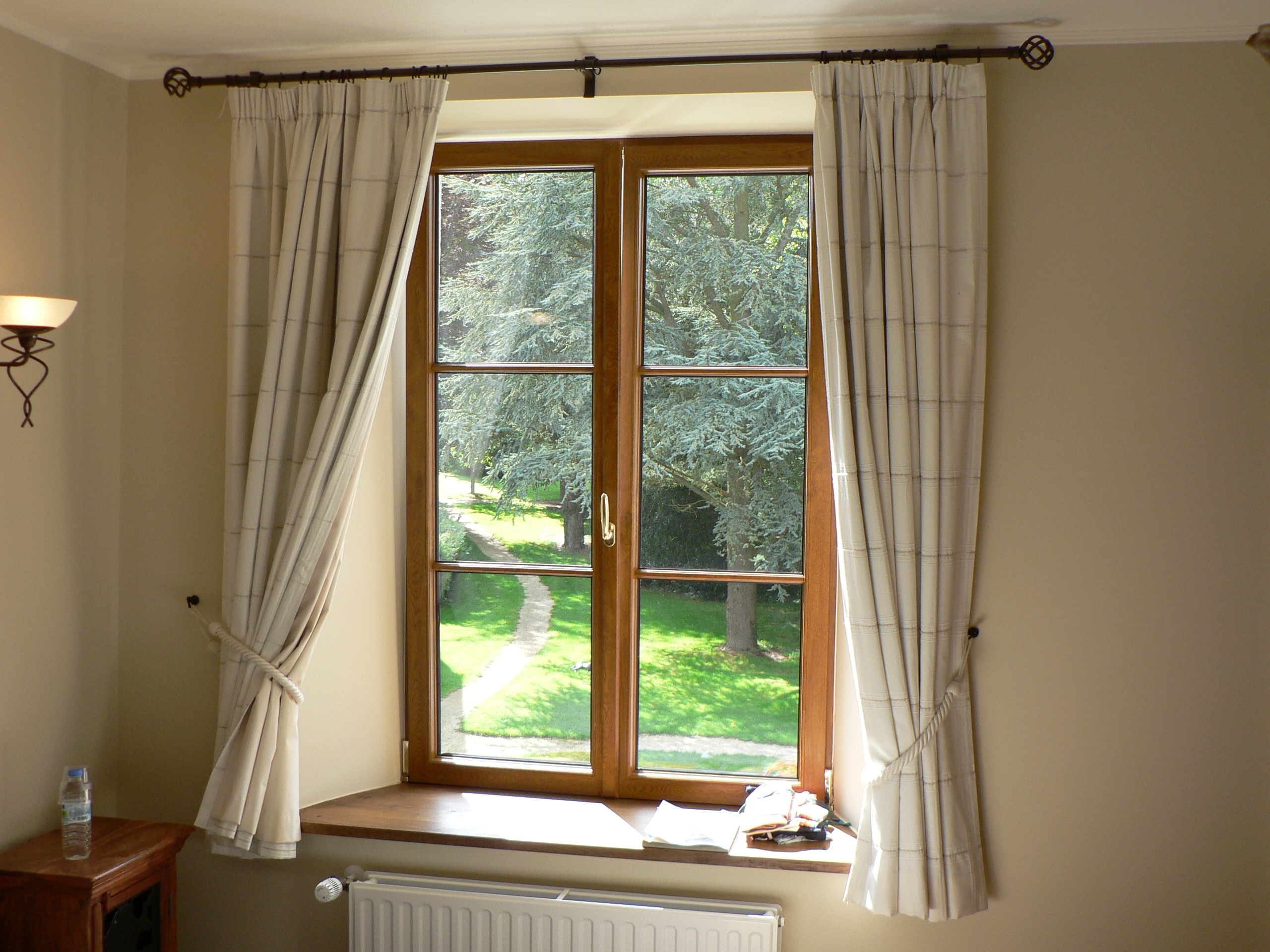
Casement window

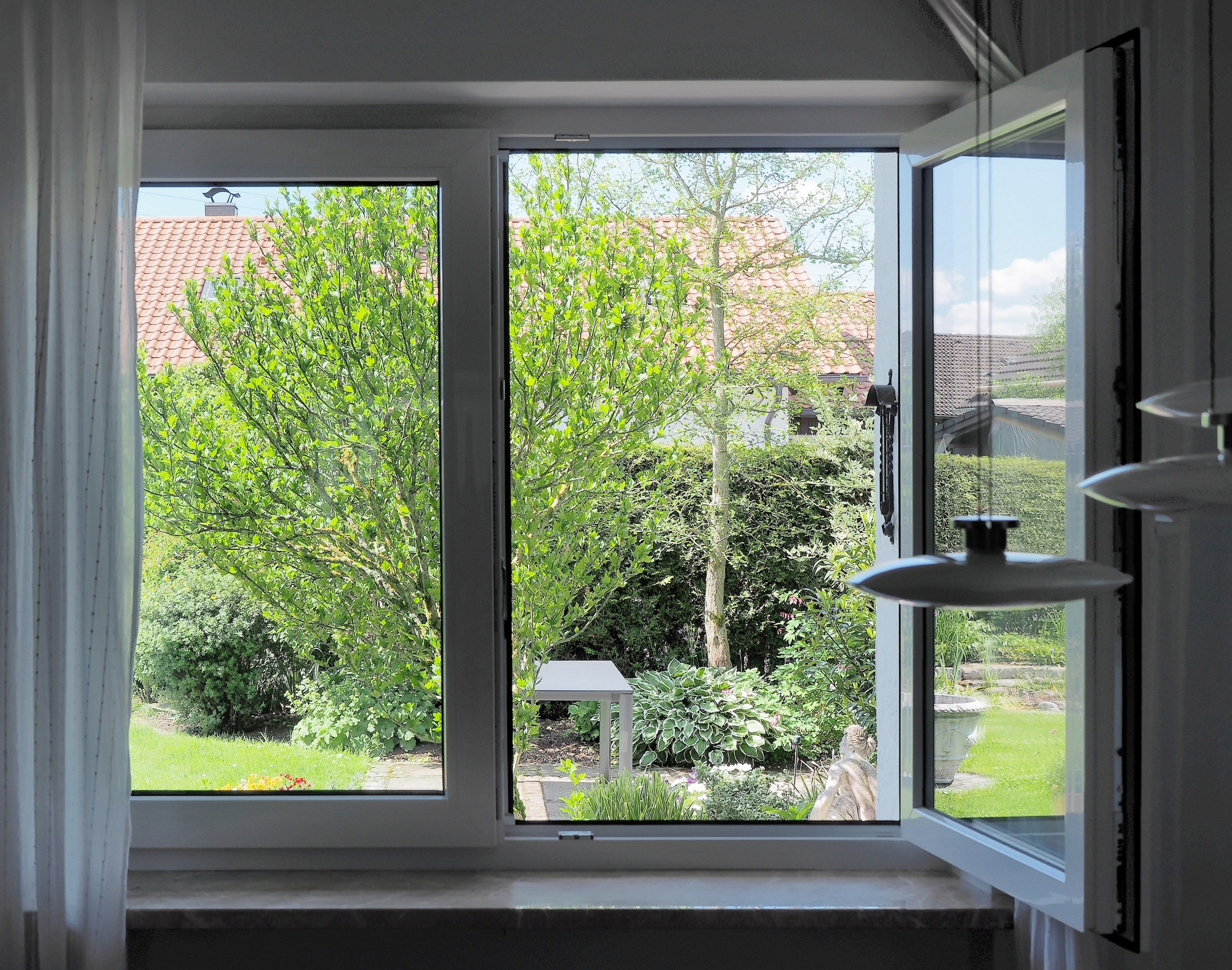
Casement window swinging in

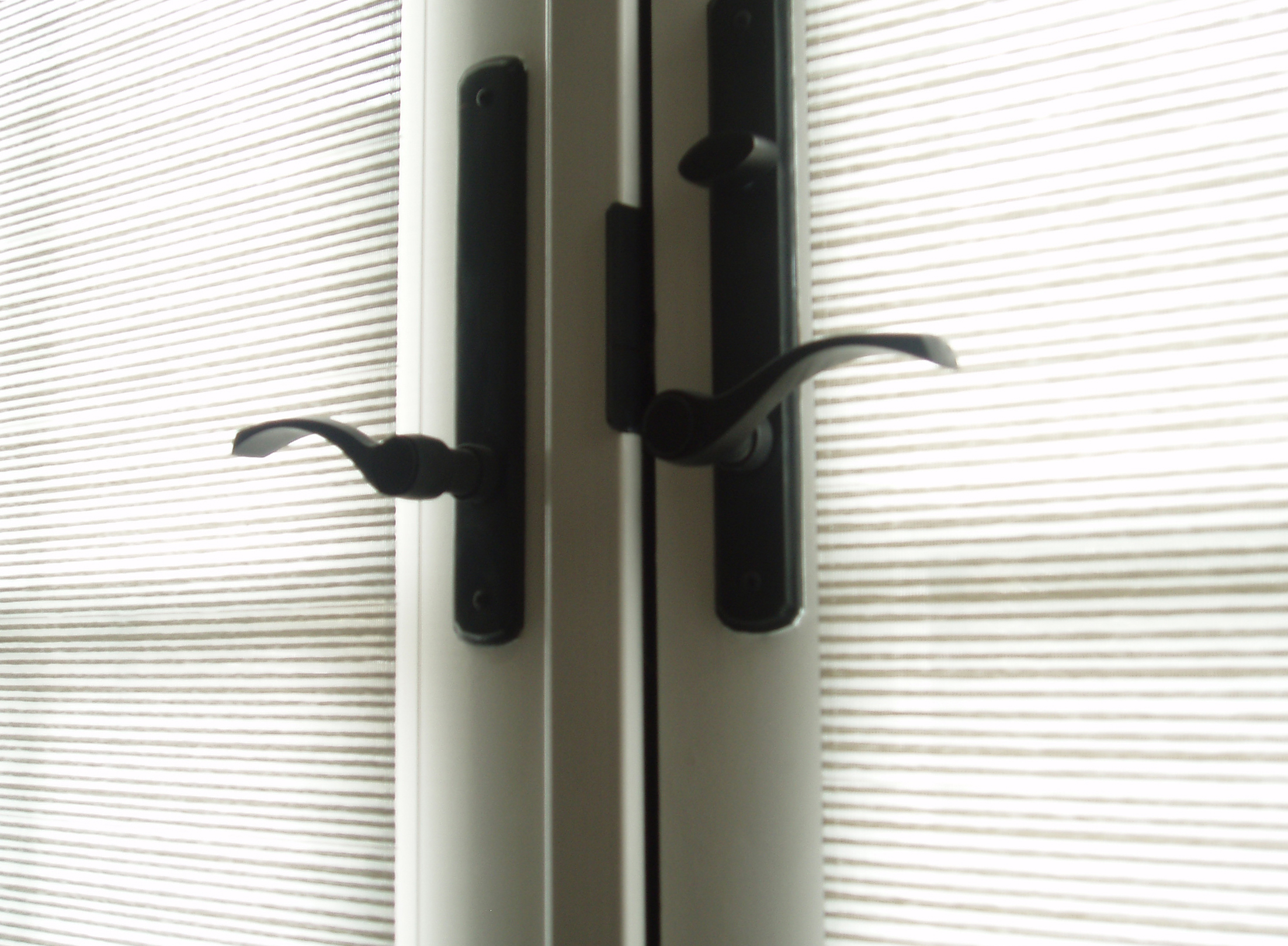
Window locks use lever handles
