= Heritage Tower (Battle Creek, Michigan) =

Building in Battle Creek

The Heritage Tower
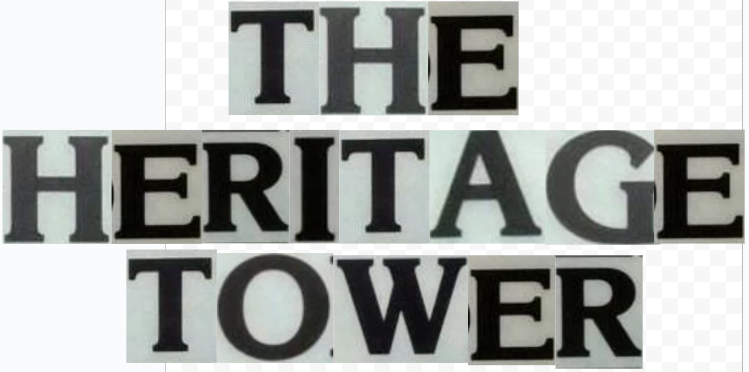

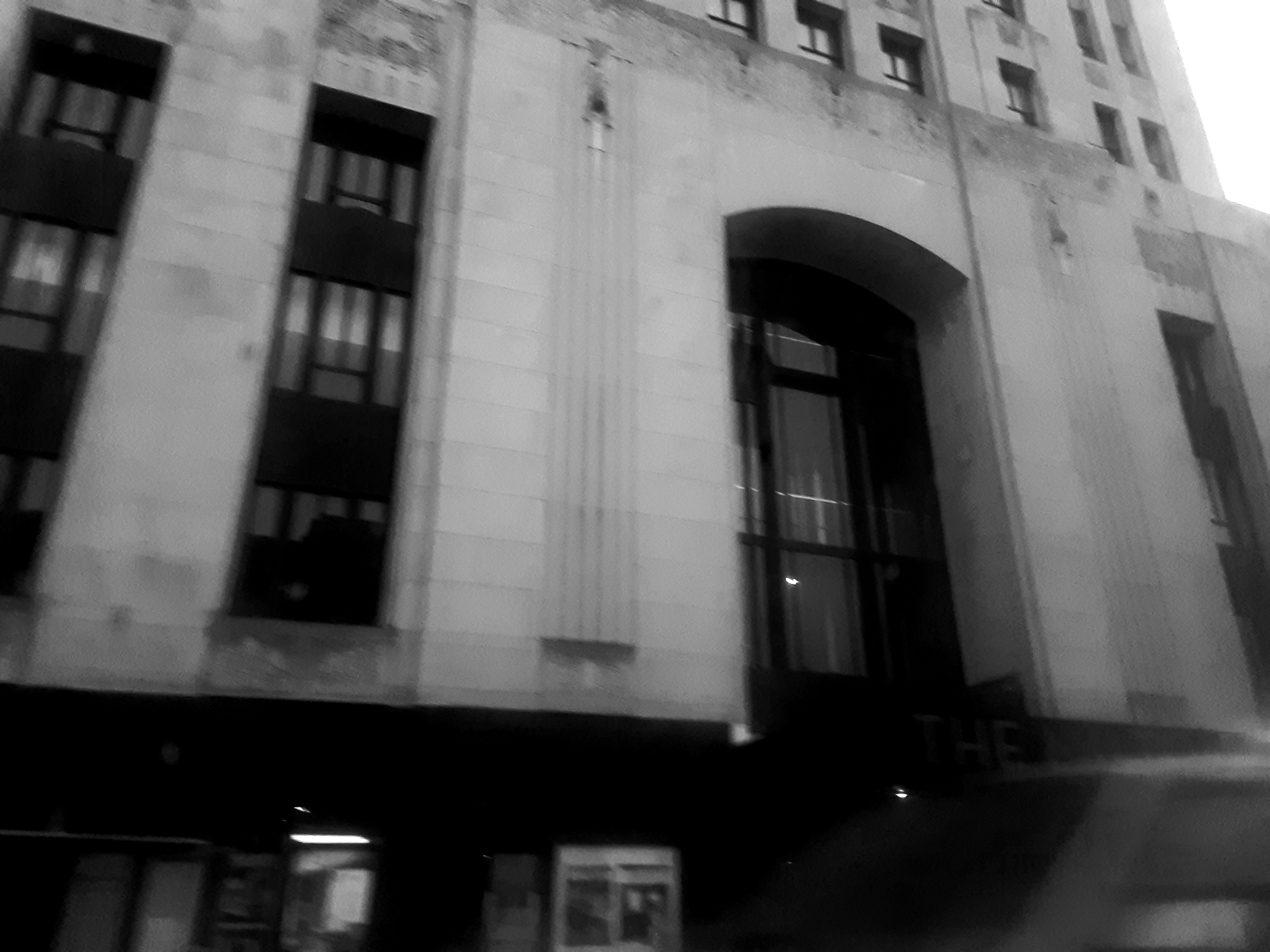
- A picture of the base of the tower taken from a car in April of 2024
- Former names: The Heritage Tower(1994-2019) Comerica Tower(1983-1994) Detroit Bank Tower (1982-1983) SNB Bank & Trust Tower(1980-1983) George C. McKay Tower(1978-1980) Security National Bank Building(1935-1983) Old-Merchants National Tower(1931-1933)

General information
- Status: Open
- Architectural style: Art Deco
- Location: 25 West Michigan Avenue, Battle Creek, Michigan, Battle Creek, United States
- Current tenants: Raymond James, MWC, Inc.,
- Named for: Maureen Craig, who won in a naming contest with The Heritage Tower
- Year built: 1930-1931
- Groundbreaking: late 1930
- Construction started: late 1930
- Completed: August 15, 1931
- Opened: August 15, 1931
- Renovated: ...
- Closed: (The Heritage Tower) 2012

Height
- Height: 238 ft (73 m)

Technical details
- Material: Grey Indiana Limestone
- Floor count: 20 floors
- Lifts/elevators: ...

Design and construction
- Architects: Weary and Alford
- Architecture firm: Weary and Alford, Walbridge and Aldinger
- Engineer: ...
- Other designers: W.P. Nelson Company, Alexander Rindskopf, Victor Pearlman

Renovating team
- Renovating firm: ...

Other information
- Number of stores: ...
- Number of anchors: ...
- Number of rooms: ...
- Number of restaurants: ...
- Number of bars: ...
- Facilities: ...
- Parking: Underground
- Public transit: Battle Creek Transit

Website
- www.themiltonbattlecreek.com
- Old-Merchants National Bank and Trust Company Building
- U.S. National Register of Historic Places
- Coordinates: 42°19′12″N 85°10′59″W
- Area: less than one acre
- Built: 1930—1931
- Built by: Walbridge and Aldinger
- Architect: Weary and Alford
- Architectural style: Art Deco
- Restored: 2016,2017,2018,2019,2021
- Restored by: Battle Creek Unlimited
- Website: https://themiltonbattlecreek.com/
- NRHP reference No.: 100002887
- Added to NRHP: November 21, 2018

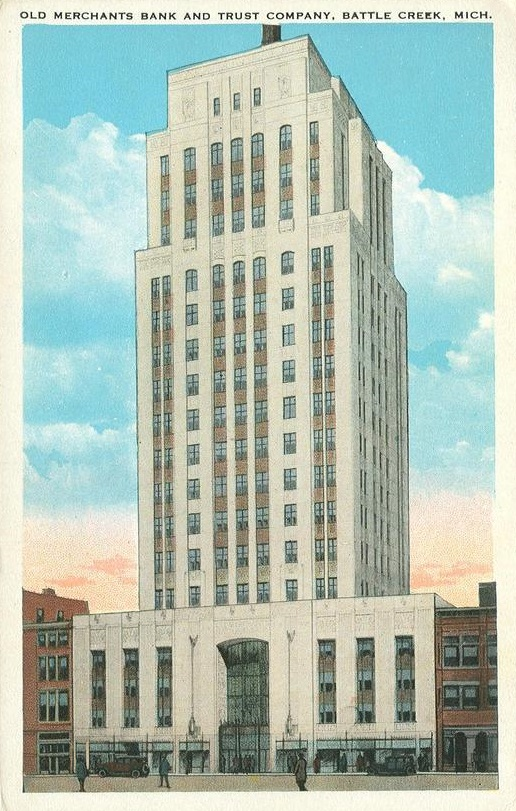
Old Merchants Bank And Trust Building, from a postcard

The Heritage Tower is a mixed-use commercial and residential building located at 25 West Michigan Avenue in Battle Creek, Michigan. It was originally built as the Old-Merchants National Bank and Trust Company Building, and designed as an office building. It was listed on the National Register of Historic Places in 2018.

== History ==
In July of 1851 in Battle Creek, Michigan, Loyal Case Kellogg (December 25, 1822-January 30, 1907), who lived at 118 Maple Street(Capital Avenue Northeast) owned a private bank where he swapped due bills and brought buyers and sellers together. At the time, there was not a lot of money to be exchanged in the small village, Kellogg facilitated the use of trading and exchanging of goods and business notes. In September of 1865, Kellogg signed an application for a nationally-chartered bank. His bank was the first bank to be chartered in the city. The bank then changed its name to First National Bank and relocated its headquarters to a building that was part of the Whitcomb Block located at 1 East Main Street(East Michigan Avenue).

In August of 1867, Kellogg sold his interest to Victory Phelps Collier (April 25, 1819-June 28, 1898), Clement Wakelee (March 7, 1821-April 7, 1889), Thomas Brockway Skinner (November 17, 1822-February 26, 1901), William Merritt-. In 1855 the Leon & Jennings Private Bank was founded and in 1856, Jennings sold his interest and the bank became the Leon & Sanborn Private Bank. In 1859, A.C. Hamblin & Company, another private bank, succeeded it. On June 2, 1888 the bank received a national charter and became the Merchants National Bank of Battle Creek. Federal charters required banks to meet certain regulatory standards, creating more reliability and safety than the private banks of the 'Free-banking' era. In 1891 First National Bank opened a savings department. The Merchants National Bank reorganized as the Merchants Savings Bank on April 1, 1895. The name change emphasized the expanding capabilities of the bank, which now allowed for depositors to receive interest from deposits. In 1898 First National Bank merged with the Farmers & Mechanics Bank. In 1905, First National Bank went through multiple reorganizations and became the Old National Bank & Trust Company.

In the early 1910s, the Merchants Savings Bank built a new headquarters at 23 West Main Street. During a three-week financial panic in October of 1907, when most banks required a month's notice to withdraw funds to stem bank-runs, Old National remained financially solvent, and met the withdrawal demands of its customers. In 1915, Old National Bank moved into a building at 29-31 West Main Street. In the mid-1920s, Old National Bank operated the Calhoun County Abstract of Title, which was house in the building at 29 West Main Street. Around 1929, the two banks were nestled by the Grand Leader Department Store(17-21 West Main Street, Formerly the Hamblin Opera House until 1902), People's Outfitting Company(25-27 West Main Street), an unknown shop, Calhoun County Abstract & Title, another unknown shop. There was also the No. 1 Fire Station, also called the Central Fire Station located near the back of the Merchants Savings Bank. This building was later demolished somewhere around 1974. These two banks were fairly popular in the area, along with competitors such as the Central National Bank, which was located at 2 West Main Street right beside Old National Bank. Also in 1929, Old National Bank & Trust Company and the Merchants Savings Bank merged, creating the Old-Merchants National Bank and Trust Company of Battle Creek. At the time, this was the largest financial institution between Detroit and Chicago.

The newly-merged Bank decided to commission a new, larger structure for their headquarters, and hired the Chicago firm of Weary and Alford, who designed the nearby American National Bank(Kalamazoo) building and the Kalamazoo City Hall, to design a new building. Construction began in early 1930, under the supervision of Detroit contractors, Walbridge and Aldinger. Buildings from 23-27 West Main Street were demolished first. Merchants Savings Bank moved in with Old National Bank at 29-31 West Main Street temporarily, closing off the under construction base of the building with a false wall. When the base of the building was half completed, they had the bank move into the completed half of the building, and demolished the former Old National Bank Building at 29-31 West Main Street. During construction of the tower, a couple floors were added to mess with the nearby competition of Central National Bank. This made the Central National Bank Tower the second tallest in Battle Creek, being 233 feet tall At the time of its construction, it was one of two high-rises that seemed to race to the sky. The architects Weary & Alford were leaders in the design of banks, both regionally and nationally.

== Old-Merchants National Bank and Trust Company/The Building ==
When it was completed in August of 1931, the base of the 238 foot, and 6 inch, 20-story tower was 4-stories tall, and housed the main entrance from West Michigan Avenue, the escalator lobby, Grand staircase, three-story second floor central vaulted space, and a lounge and office spaces. The central vaulted space sat to the south of the tower and was topped with a flat roof that had three raised concrete framed skylights that were used to let in light into the space below. The skylights were originally created with inset glass blocks.* The basement of the central area held mechanical spaces(especially in later stages of the tower), and storage rooms. The recessed ornamental metal gate that would rise to seal off the Grand staircase, a small elevator lobby, and some parking areas that extend to the south wing's street side access.

The tower's exterior was built with 2,000 tons of gray Indiana limestone from Bedford, Indiana. The base of the main facade was trimmed with black granite, although in 1974, some of the original granite tiles were removed and replaced. This is mentioned deeper in the article. While the ornamental metal panels remain in the outer windows, the metal grilles that hung in front of all of the three windows are no longer there, and were most likely removed in the mid-1940s, although the spot where they were is now covered up with two fluted panels. The grilles were made of Swedish white iron and were cast in Minneapolis. Engraved on the face of the arched head was the words "OLD-MERCHANTS NATIONAL BANK & TRUST COMPANY." Which was later removed somewhere around 1934 and 1935, when the bank restructured as Security National Bank.

Two asymmetrically spaced cast metal columns supported the edges of two cast metal ornamental panels that were mounted about two feet short of the spring line of an arched head. The canopy was cantilevered out below a series of three large windows that began near the roof of the canopy and stopped at a decoratively carved limestone arch. The ornamental panels were topped with a cast sculptural ornament depicting stylized Peacocks. The birds were perched atop minor column forms that serve as vertical mullions for the glass panels behind it. The decorative metal work had horizontal structural supports at the floor lines that break the vertical opening roughly into thirds. At the sides and under the head of the arch were intricate carvings in the limestone depicting full female forms at the sides and a band of leafy plants and berries at the arch. Centered on either side of the arch was a flat section of limestone that housed a vertically fluted section with a fish's head in a relief near the top. The fish's mouth held a pendant for a large hanging decorative light fixture that no longer exists. These central elements were topped with a decorative horizontal band of carved limestone of vines and leaves extended up, visually, by aligning with the elements of the central arch below that housed the projected fish head sculptures.

These fifth story elements form large projected piers that ran all the way up to the roof of the twentieth floor. At the top, is a projected, peaked, limestone arch, topped with decorative carving, surrounding the two windows at the fifth-floor base of the tower. These elements set the magnificent vertical element apart from the rest. The spandrels of the vertical element are limestone while all the rest, going up, are made of decorative cast metal panels of a darker color. The vertical patterns created end at the top of the fifteenth floor with another continuous series of decorative and flat limestone panels in a horizontal pattern. At that point the corners stepped in to allow for a ledge, with a parapet, to cover up lighting anticipated in the original plans of the tower. The outer edge window slots are stopped at both sides and the pattern of windows and spandrels continue up to the top of the eighteenth floor. This vertical section also ended with a horizontal series of smooth and carved limestone panels.

The entire nineteenth floor steps in at the east and west sides to create a shelf with a parapet to conceal the lighting. At that point, all corners are chamfered at a forty-five-degree angle and head upward with fluted limestone panels leading to the top of the structure which is topped with a parapet and a continuous horizontal band of carved stone. This band was broken at the center by two 20-story tall three-quarter relief, stylized, limestone birds of prey sitting on top of two central minor piers that went up from the fifth floor. The nineteenth floor is reduced to five recessed steel windows with casements over hopper form while the twentieth floor had three single fixed steel windows centered in the recessed bays with a decorative carved panel below them. The center vertical element has three-over-three steel double hung windows, behind a steel fire escape, with vertical fluted metal spandrels and carved limestone matching the front facade.

Fire escape landings started in front of the southwestern slot and housed original four paneled steel and glass doors with transoms and metal spandrels above at floors 7, 10, 11, 12, 14 and 15. Almost all of the doors in the slot are contemporary hollow metal doors and frames with transoms. The eastern recessed slot is filled with double casement windows containing three lights on each side. The configuration matches that of the north facade with decorative metal spandrels and carved limestone as they travel up the facade. The top two window openings in the center and east bays are filled with louvers.

Both east and west tower facades start at the fifth floor above the fourth-floor flat roofs. Twin bays of typical, double casement over hopper windows are present on the north and south sides with decorative limestone spandrels above that establish the visual horizontal base of the facades. Both facades have a one story tall central, limestone cube topped with a flat roof and a parapet including three decorative carved panels that complete the horizontal base started by the spandrels just mentioned. These cubes housed stacks and air vents, according to original drawings, and are positioned below a recessed central bay of three typical double casement over hopper windows separated by limestone piers. Decorative metal spandrels start at window heads in all cases. The central bay of windows is topped with a fully fluted panel. These cast spandrels proceed outward with six flutes surrounding a decorative casting in the next rows of central bay windows followed by simpler recessed slots flanking a simpler casting in the spandrels of the last two windows at each side. This repetition of bays, windows and spandrels separated by flat limestone panels proceeds up the facade until reaching the fifteenth floor where decorative limestone panels top the vertical progression.

The Old-Merchants National Bank & Trust Company was the first bank to use Golden Travertine in its mezzanine in the United States. The amount used in the tower's mezzanine was around 110 tons. The mezzanine also had the first wooden escalator in Michigan, installed by the Otis Elevator Company. The tables in the mezzanine were able to be easily picked up and stored for any public event, wedding ceremony, and any other event. The walls were designed by an architect Alexander Rindskopf. The dome was painted by the W. P. Nelson Company. The floor is made with Roman Travertine, quarried in Romana, Campagna, Italy. For the Levanto marble, it was reported that 70 tons of red were used in the bank tower. The original wall configuration starts at the first door and large window, where upon entry, customers are greeted with a stairway that consists of marble treads and was divided in half by a central ornamental railing, along with the two wooden escalators on either side of the stairs.

The front entry was recessed under a second-story bridge from the east to the west mezzanines that is faced with Red Levanto marble. Upon walking up, the customers of the Old-Merchants National Bank see the original grandeur of the lobby. The view up the grand stair revealed the central circular skylight and its original hanging light fixture featured in the dome four stories above. The entire massive ceiling was treated with stenciled painted artwork including gold leaf applications. The floors were patterned with Golden Travertine marble, quarried in the former Czechoslovakia. Each skylight housed a large, cable hung, light fixture of decorative etched glass. In From the south entrance, customers are greeted with Red Levanto marble walls; curved, dentil-like, ceiling trims and a marble base on the south that runs to the elevator lobby.

Approaching the first floor from the rear, Old-Merchants National Bank customers are greeted with a wooden staircase and a raised section that allows access to the higher level of the West Michigan Avenue entrance. In the elevator lobby, customers were greeted with Deep red and white veined Travertine marble that surrounded the elevator lobby and a stenciled ceiling painting that tracks designs similar to the ones carved in the limestone in the exterior and the rhythm of the decorative panels. The elevator doors were etched with beautiful stylized leaf patterns of the Art Deco era. Opposed to the elevator lobby was a recessed space that resided under the second story mezzanine as an entry alcove to rented spaces west of the main entry. Some of the lights in the mezzanine were taken from the Old National Bank building.

A recessed area had a mirror image of the ceiling painting and details of the elevator lobby. At the time, banking offices occupied the first five floors, with rental offices above. At the time of opening, the building 70% occupied. However, the banks owners knew that the bank would end up failing at some point. That time came during the Great Depression, when multiple banks in Michigan closed temporarily, like the American National Bank in Kalamazoo. Some of the banks remained open. The Old-Merchants National Bank was not one of them. Old-Merchants National Bank & Trust Company was forced to close its doors on June 13, 1933.

== Security National Bank-George C. McKay-SNB Bank & Trust ==
In June of 1935, the defunct Bank reorganized as Security National Bank of Battle Creek. While is predecessor was popular, Security National was a titan. In the early 1940s, a large sign was attached and hung off the wall in front of the giant window in the base of the building that had a clock, temperature sign, and had SECURITY NATIONAL BANK on the sign. In the mid-1940s, the bank acquired the Lakeview State Bank, a bank in Bellevue, and a bank in Nashville. In 1948, radio station WBCK first went on the air in the fourth-floor of the building. By the early 1950s, the building had not only housed banks, but also started to have some shops open up, including: An Arcade, The Princess Shop, La Paull's Furs, L.G. Haig Shoes, House of Cards, Bailey Jewelers, chocolate shops, cafes, Corklane, House of Science and a Hallmark store. The banks slogan was "In Battle Creek, It's Always "Bank With Security."

On July 28, 1958, the ornate ceiling and some offices-including the broadcast studios of radio station WBCK were damaged by a fourth-floor fire, the floors were completely destroyed. After this, WBCK had moved out and moved into a new location. The bank had become a powerhouse. By the 1960s, the bank had branches in the Urbandale Plaza, Springfield, Nashville, Bellevue, Lakeview, and had an Industrial Branch near the Post and Kellogg's factory, Leonidas, North Avenue, Dickman Road, Columbia-Riverside Brach

Prior to vacancy, the office spaces on the upper floors were updated and altered with partition walls and a variety of finishes throughout the 1970s, 1980s, and 1990s to meet the needs of the former tenants. In the 1970s, the building went through multiple changes. In 1972, the opening of the Michigan Mall rapidly grew the downtown area. The central opening on the first floor and the infill under the arch are standard mill finished aluminum tube frame storefront systems assumed to have been installed in the 1970s. In 1974, the Central Fire Station was demolished and only a painted brick surface remained and being that the tower was connected to the fire station it has no original windows on east or west facades. Decorative grills were attached above the arched rear entry door to the southwest and the garage door opening to the northeast. The metal canopy under the arch has the same look and same material as the front canopy installed in the same year. It is presumed to have happened in 1974, along with the canopy on the north facade, to allow more square footage for rental space by eliminating the west corridor around the grand staircase. In 1974, the big Security National Bank sign, installed in the early-1940s, was removed along with some of the original black granite panels, which were replaced with a black metal canopy that had the Security National Bank logo on the front middle panel. The windows and doors in this part of the building had mill-finished contemporary aluminum tube framed storefronts, with two pairs of contemporary black anodized aluminum sliding entry doors centered under the projected black canopy.

In 1978, The location of the Central Fire Station next to the two-story wing facing the courtyard was given a French Provincial facade to the exposed wall. The brand new facade was designed by local Architect John Burgess and the process of building involved adding a layer of red brick; mansard roofs and first floor canopy; and bay windows with walk out French doors. In multiple newspaper articles, this space was said to have "fostered the creation of a restaurant at the southern section of the first floor." This restaurant never opened. Also in 1978, the tower was renamed the McKay Tower, after the late George C. McKay, who was the chairman of the Board of directors. When the building was renamed the George C. McKay Tower in 1978 that name was prominently emblazoned across the canopy.

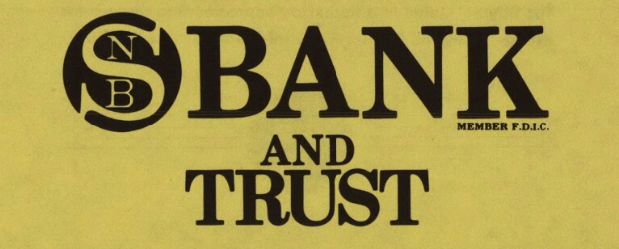
The logo for SNB Bank & Trust

In 1980, Security National became SNB Bank & Trust, rebranding all of its locations. Through the years this facade has had many signs and marquees attached to it as evidenced by "ghosting" and holes remaining from earlier attachments. The original light fixtures were replaced by pendant mounted fixtures in the 1980s. In 1981, a financial institution by the name of Detroit Bank & Trust Company, acquires SNB Bank & Trust. On July 1, 1982, Detroit Bank & Trust Company was acquired by Comerica, Inc. and the tower was renamed the Comerica Tower. This would be the last bank in the tower.

== The Heritage Tower ==
In 1990, the Athelstan Club closed due to a lack of memberships, the decline in the popularity of dining clubs, and the competition with golf clubs. In 1992, the Michigan Mall was removed and traffic through West and East Michigan Avenue had resumed after nearly 17 years. In 1993, the building was sold to a Bay City, Michigan based firm by the name of Dore Industrial Development, who refurbished the tower. In 1994, a naming contest was held by the owner of the firm, Arthur P. Dore(May 1, 1936-November 2, 2022). The contest was won by Battle Creek Native Maureen Craig, who won with the name The Heritage Tower. Comerica, Inc. then signed a ten-year lease that would last from 1993 to 2003. Before Dore Industrial had bought the building, Comerica, Inc. was originally planning on demolishing the tower, until the firm purchased the tower and remodeled it instead of demolishing it, as owner of the firm, Arthur Dore claimed in the Battle Creek Enquirer, "The building is too good to come down." They had also renovated the escalators and elevators, and the nineteenth floor was completely re-configured for office use.

On December 31, 2001, 33 year-old John Henning, who was a part time maintenance worker at the tower, walked up to the roof of the tower, scratched his initials, birth date and an undisclosed epitaph on a concrete block, then jumped at 9:30 am and attempted to commit suicide. He survived the 238 foot plunge, and miraculously survived by happening to hit a Pontiac Trans Am.

Around 2005, WWMT held offices in the 1st floor of the tower. Sprint also had a cell tower on top of the tower. In 2007, Dore briefly listed the building for sale on eBay after the building began to struggle with finding a permanent tenant, and in 2008, the tower was purchased by Florida based Random Acquisitions, LLC., and weddings and special events were held in the second floor lobby until 2009, but the tower portion of the building was condemned. The last restaurant, Barista Blues, located at 23 West Michigan in the street-level portion of the tower, left the building in 2011. Random Acquisitions LLC., were now struggling on paying the utility bills and were also failing to keep the building in shape, and in 2011, Random Acquisitions, LLC. had abandoned the building.

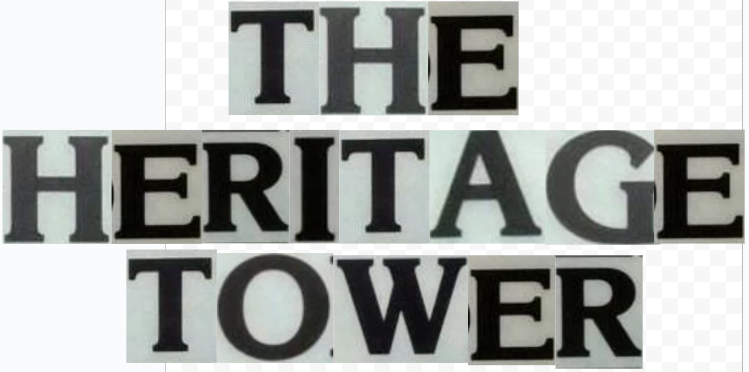
A recreation of the former logo for the tower(1993-2020)

WWMT's last year of occupancy in the tower was 2012. Now both the tower and the base of the building were left without electricity, water, and heating for weeks. Eventually, the city found out and forced all of the remaining occupants, or lack thereof, to vacate the tower by Friday, unless power was restored to the tower. The city condemned the whole building and things like water, power, and heating were officially cut off. The Sprint tower was also affected and caused the data to become spotty. The now abandoned tower was exposed to the elements and vandals. Years of vacancy had left the interior in horrible shape. Ceilings and walls had been damaged by water and ripped open and relieved of any valuable metals, and water damage had completely caked the mezzanine. The original marble was damaged in certain places, but was mostly intact throughout the building. The decorative paintings, skylights and plaster details had remained but had been eroded by water infiltration. The dome windows had been tarred over and had experienced terrible damage and had been leaking. Dark staining of the limestone above the eighteen floor and evidence of former crack repair began to show, along with some open mortar joints.

All of the original doors and frames had been corroded. The steel windows on almost the entire tower were very corroded, along with most of the windows missing doors, being busted open, or had been completely removed. The interior had little to no graffiti at all. Both of the front sections of the fourth floor had been re-configured many times with a lack of attention to historical character. Many Acoustic twelve-by-twelve tiles had been glued to the ceilings inside the tower, and as a result of the roof leaks, almost all of them had fallen off. The ‘Fourth B’ floor was a bare concrete and masonry interstitial space that housed ductwork and fans, also storing maintenance supplies and salvaged historical materials. The escalators had become inoperable long after the power was fully cut and remain as a memory of the past. Inside the vault, the metal ceiling and original light fixtures were still there but they were somewhat damaged because of the moisture. The mezzanine was completely trashed, the parking garage and basement were flooded and the roof problems got even worse, causing mold to infiltrate the building.

In the south facade courtyard, weeds and overgrown trees began to cover the building. Some of the windows were boarded up due to being damaged by weather or from being smashed. Carpet inside the building was either attacked by moss or mold. Remaining inoperable machines were heavily corroded and littered the building. The steel fire escape began to rust. The signs of the tower began to slowly fade and black streaks began appear under the letters. Much of the now exposed steel framework inside of the mezzanine had been completely corroded. The beautiful paintings inside of the mezzanine had become unrecognizable. Much of the Roman Travertine had yellowed, matching the color of the Golden Travertine. Blinds in certain floors of the tower were completely damaged, removed or were in horrible condition. A poster for WWMT still hung in a window of one of the windows on the tower. A sign for WWMT also remained on the tower until 2016, when it was removed. Eventually, the Battle Creek Community Foundation located across the street decided to fix some of the roof problems in 2013. Also in 2013, the owner of the tower became 25 West Michigan Holdings, LLC., a 616 Development subsidiary. At this point, the tower was now an abandoned husk of its former self.

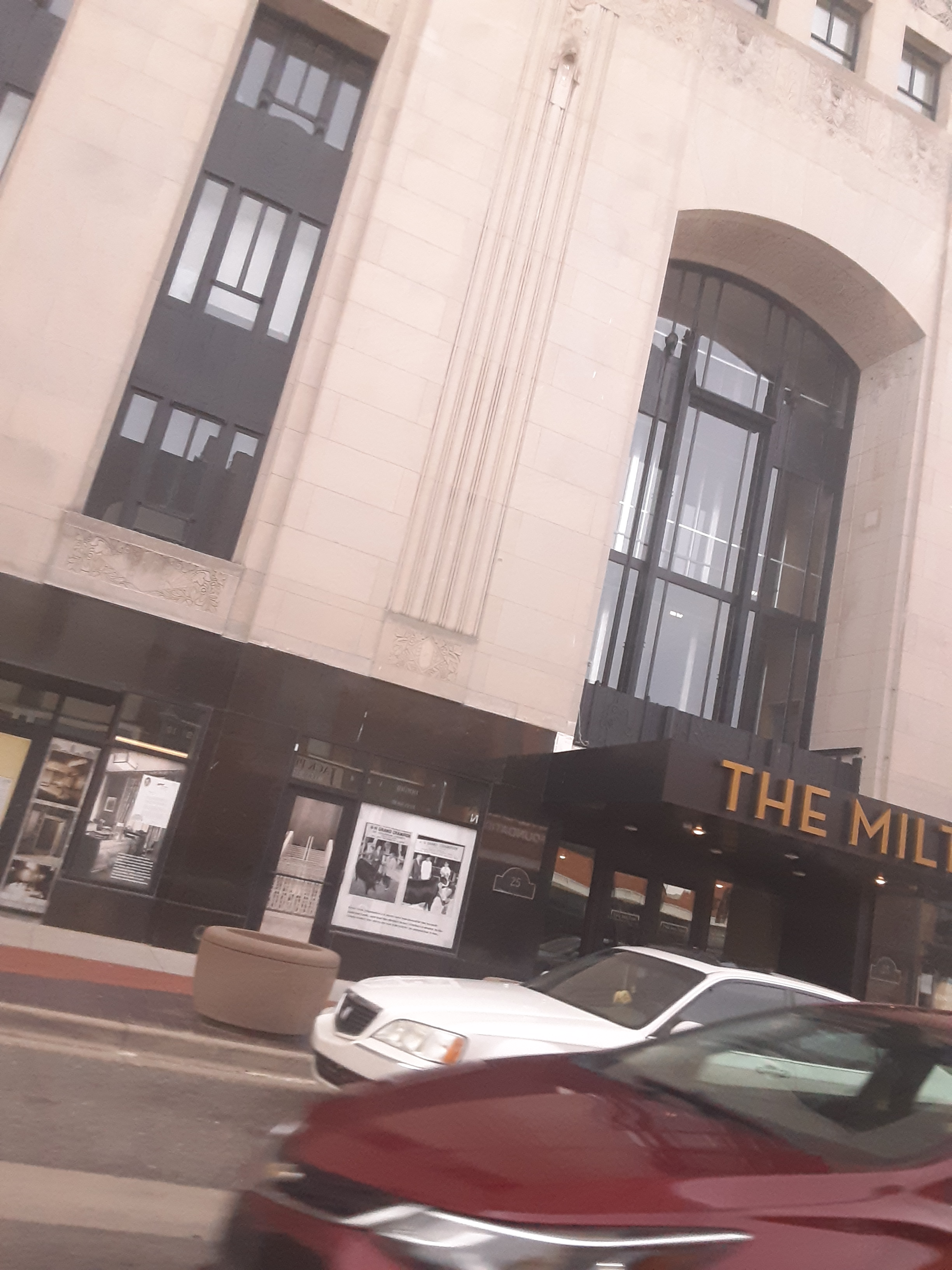
The Milton

== The Milton ==
In 2016, Battle Creek Unlimited purchased the tower for development. The prepping for the repairs began with the covering up of the storefront windows and the big window in 2017, then covering them up with historical info decals about the tower. The tower's name changed one last time to The Milton, in reference to Milton Township, it now houses two retail floors which now houses, a Raymond James, another financial service, MWC, Inc., Somebody Records, Representative Mike Nofs and more. It also houses 85 apartments above.

== Description ==
The Heritage Tower is a 238 foot, and 6 inch twenty-story building. The exterior is faced with 2,000 tons of gray Bedford (Indiana) limestone. The base of the main facade is trimmed with black granite. On the interior, a monumental 46-foot central dome rises through to the 4th floor with the walls covered in Golden Travertine. It is Battle Creek's largest building, with the second largest being the former Central National Tower on 70 West Michigan.
