= Battle Creek Tower =

- Central National Tower
- U.S. National Register of Historic Places
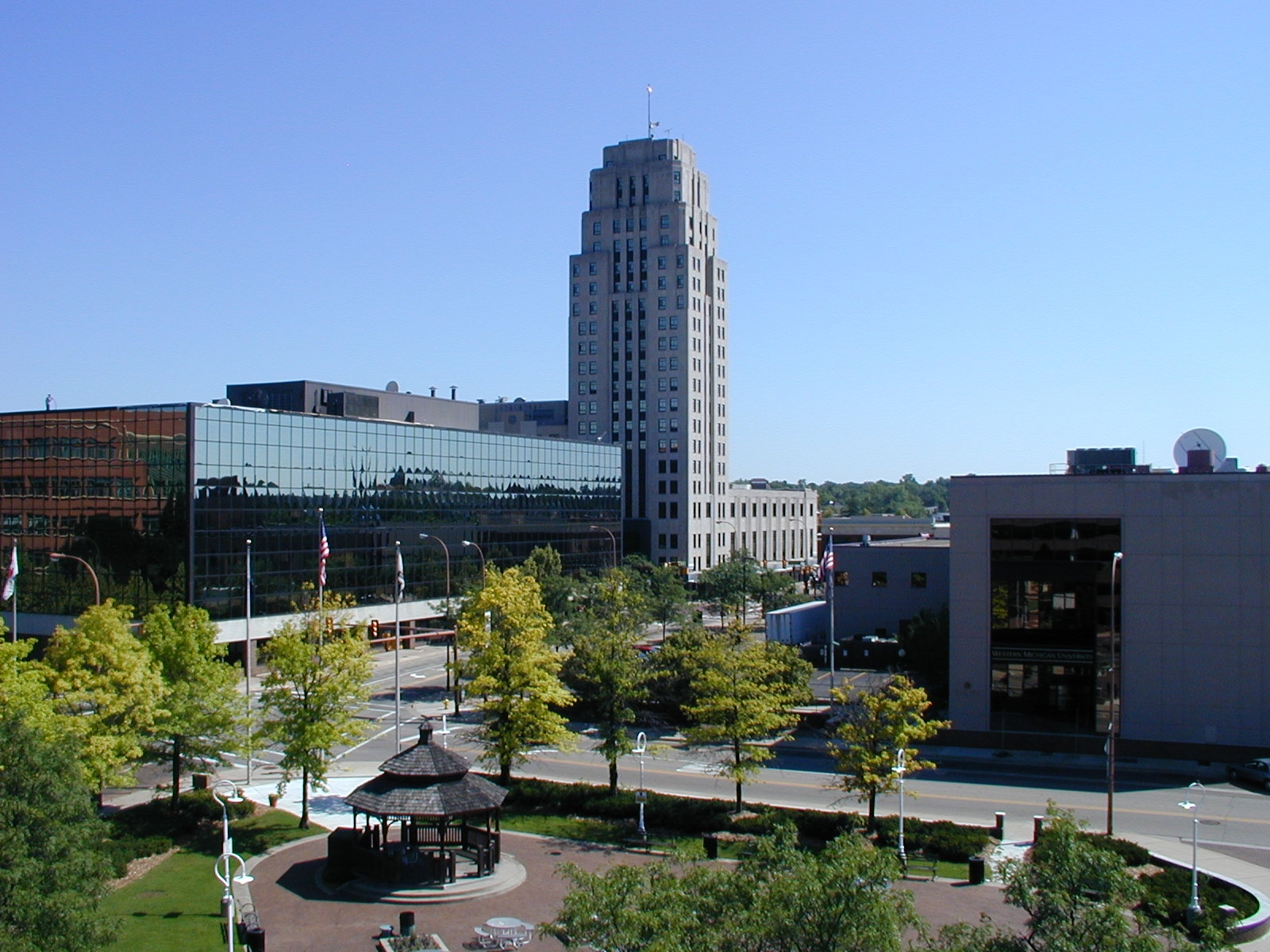
- Interactive map
- Location: 70 W. Michigan Ave., Battle Creek, Michigan
- Coordinates: 42°19′17″N 85°11′03″W
- Area: less than one acre
- Built: 1931
- Architect: John A. Holabird, John Wellborn Root Jr.
- Architectural style: Art Deco
- NRHP reference No.: 08000218
- Added to NRHP: March 20, 2008

The Battle Creek Tower is a mixed-use commercial and residential building located at 70 West Michigan Avenue in Battle Creek, Michigan. It was originally built as the Central National Tower, and designed as an office building. It was listed on the National Register of Historic Places in 2008.

== History ==
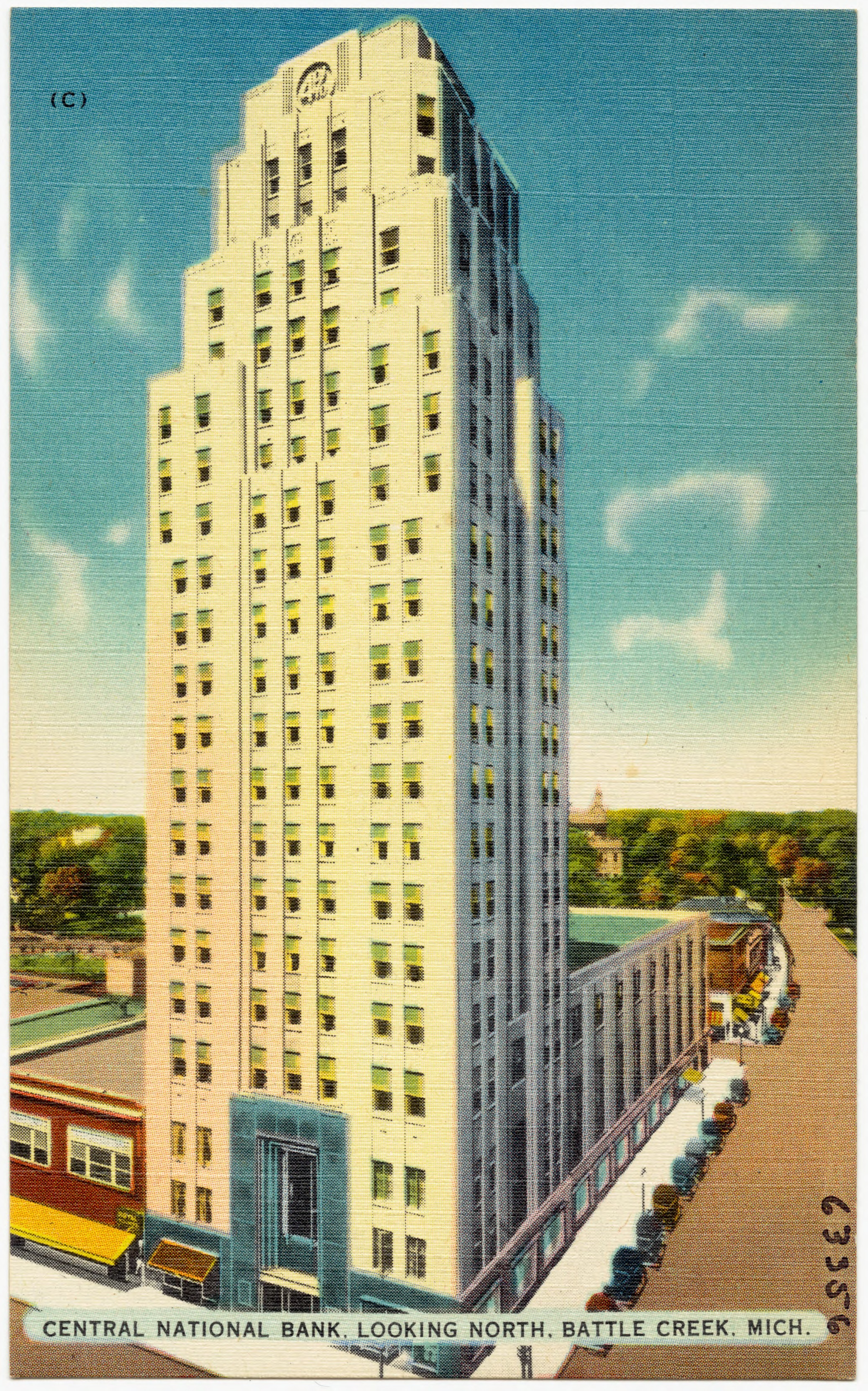
Central National Tower, c. 1940

Central National Bank and Trust Company was founded in 1903 and was one of the many banks in Battle Creek at the time and was part of the "Bank Corners". The bank was originally headquartered at 2 West Main St (Now West Michigan Avenue.) In 1929, C.W. Post's widow Leila Young Post Montgomery sold the Majorie Block, named after Post's only daughter Marjorie Merriweather Post in 1929. Central National Bank hired the Chicago architectural firm of John A. Holabird and Wellborn Root Jr. (Holabird & Root) to design a new headquarters for them on the site. Construction began in late 1929 with the corner of the Marjorie Block being demolished. A ceremony was held by Central National Bank on January 24, 1931, and the tower was completed on August 20, 1930. After the tower was completed, Central National left its 2 West Michigan headquarters and moved into the building and the new headquarters opened to the public on June 20, 1931. The new building contained other office spaces which was leased by prominent Battle Creek attorneys, physicians, dentists, accountants, and real estate agents. The buildings exterior was made with buff-colored Indiana Oolitic limestone, perched on a black granite base. The front facade is 66 feet wide and symmetrical. The main central entrance is set into a large square-head portal which is faced with grey granite. Deeply recessed vertical window banks on the tower emphasize the vertical lines of the tower. Originally, there was a relief with the number 4%, in reference to a sign on the bank's original headquarters. The 4% was later changed to 3% before being plastered over. The building was also the tallest building in the city, over passing the Battle Creek Sanitarium "Towers" built in 1929. This was then over passed by the Old-Merchants National Bank & Trust Company Tower in 1931 and that tower still holds its place as the tallest building in Battle Creek. The remaining section of the Marjorie Block later contained a theatre called the Regent Theatre. The building would later be demolished for a 7-story annex to the tower. Central National Bank maintained its offices until 1947, when it merged with Michigan National Bank at 1 West Main St. who also owned the bank corner icon the Bailey Building, and moved Central National Bank's offices to a different location. Central National Bank lost its old identity when it was merged with Michigan National Bank. In 1951, the building was purchased by the Wolverine Insurance Company, which changed the name to the Wolverine Federal Tower. In the mid-1970s, along with the demolition of the former, Post Motor Inn or the Post Tavern, a 7-story annex was built next to the tower where the former Regent Theatre. The company added a W sign at the top where the 4%/3% was. This was changed to a W & F somewhere around 1954. In 1959, a Thunderbolt warning siren, manufactured by Federal Signal, was installed along with an American Flag atop the tower. In 1978, Transamerica Insurance Corporation bought the Wolverine Insurance Company, along with the nearby Riverside Insurance Company and Premier Insurance Company. Wolverine Insurance Company became the Wolverine-Transamerica Insurance Corporation of Battle Creek, and a light up W & T where the W & F sign was. In 1984, the building became the Transamerica Tower. Nationwide Insurance bought the Wolverine Insurance Company and merged becoming the Nationwide-Wolverine Insurance Company and began a $9 million improvements on the elevators, electrical systems and sprinkler systems. In 2000, Nationwide sold the building to the Hinman Company and planned to move its employees to Iowa, in which most of them refused and Nationwide retained offices in the building. In that same year, the Hinman Company, who recently had the building sold to them, renamed the building the Battle Creek Tower and redeveloped the building into a mixed use development, with the upper floors redesigned as residential space.

== Description ==
The Battle Creek Tower is a twenty-one-story tower designed in the Art Deco style. It has a nearly square-plan tower located in front along Michigan Avenue, and a four-story section extending to the rear. The exterior of the tower is faced with buff-colored Indiana Oolitic limestone, perched on a black granite base. The front facade is 66 feet wide and symmetrical. The main central entrance is set into a large square-head portal which is faced with gray granite. An American Flag and a Federal Signal Thunderbolt siren are both mounted atop the building. The third and seventeenth floors contain a series of carved limestone panels with stylized floral motifs. Deeply recessed vertical window banks on the tower emphasize the vertical lines of the tower.
