= Abraham Jonas (politician) =

American politician

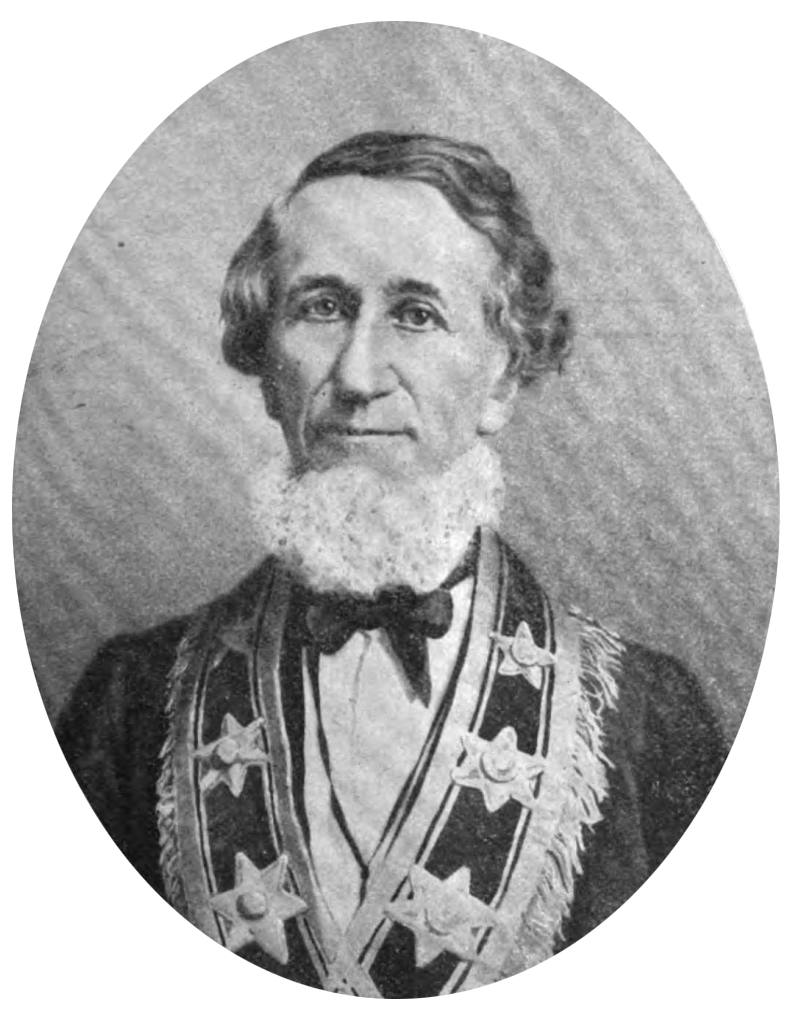
Abraham Jonas

Abraham Jonas (born September 12, 1801, in Exeter, England; died June 8, 1864) was the first permanent Jewish resident in Quincy, Illinois. He was a member of the Illinois and Kentucky state legislatures, a leading lawyer, Freemason, and a valued friend of Abraham Lincoln.

== Biography ==
Jonas was born in Exeter, England to Annie Ezekiel and Benjamin Jonas. Abraham's brother, Joseph Jonas, moved to Cincinnati, Ohio, becoming the first Jew to settle west of the Allegheny Mountains. Abraham and his brother Edward joined Joseph in Cincinnati in 1819. Abraham and his two brothers were original members of Congregation B'nai Israel (Sons of Israel), the first Jewish congregation west of the Allegheny Mountains. Abraham also joined the Freemasons in Cincinnati. He and Joseph married Lucy and Rachel Seixas; daughters of the first Rabbi born in America – Gershom Mendes Seixas. Lucy suddenly died in 1825, and Abraham moved to Williamstown, Kentucky. There he married Louisa Block from a pioneering Jewish American family and operated a general store. He was elected to the state legislature for four years. While in Kentucky, Abraham helped to organize Grant Lodge, U.D., for which he served as its charter Master in 1826. In August 1833, he was elected to serve as the Grand Master of the Grand Lodge of Free and Accepted Masons of Kentucky for the typical one-year term. During that time he and Louisa had five children. He was elected to four single-year terms to represent Grant County in the Kentucky House of Representatives in August 1828, 1829, 1831, and 1833.

In 1836 he moved to Columbus in Adams County, Illinois, to operate a general store. Within two years he moved to Quincy, Illinois opening a carriage business and studying law in Orville Browning's office. He helped to organize the Grand Lodge of Free and Accepted Masons of Illinois in 1840. He served as Master of Columbus Lodge No. 6 in Columbus, Illinois in 1840 and in 1842; he was also elected to serve as Grand Master in October 1840, in which office he remained until October 1842 (when he was succeeded in office by Meredith Helm). During the second year of his term as Grand Master of the Grand Lodge, he established Masonic Lodges under dispensation in Nauvoo, Illinois and in Montrose, Iowa Territory (Nauvoo Lodge, U.D. and Rising Sun Lodge, U.D., respectfully; these were the first of the various "Mormon Lodges" during that time).

In 1842 he was elected as a Whig to the state legislature. Louise and Abraham had three more children around this time. He decided to establish a law partnership with Henry Asbury, turning over the family business to his brothers Edward and Samuel who had joined him in Quincy in 1840 or 1841.

Although Abraham Lincoln was no longer in the Illinois General Assembly, it is likely that Jonas met Lincoln during Jonas's service in the legislature in Springfield. Jonas ran for the Illinois Senate in 1844 but was defeated by the Democratic candidate. But his loyalty to the Whig party earned him the position as postmaster of Quincy in 1849 serving until 1853. Lincoln and Jonas remained dear friends during this time. When the Whig party died, Jonas and Lincoln both joined the new Republican Party. On November 1, 1854, Lincoln was accused of attending a Know-Nothing Party meeting, but was vouched by Jonas who he was actually with. Jonas arranged the 1858 Lincoln-Douglas debate in Quincy, and aided Lincoln to his candidacy. It was his law partner Henry Asbury who suggested Lincoln's candidacy in front of a group of local Republicans. Asbury's suggestion was greeted by silence until Jonas agreed that it would be a good idea.

Abraham Jonas was noted as one of the greatest orators himself in the area. He was elected Grand Orator of the Grand Lodge of Illinois in 1843. Lincoln appointed Jonas postmaster of Quincy in 1861 until his death in 1864. Jonas had seven children, six sons and a daughter. Four of his sons, including future U.S. Senator Benjamin F. Jonas, fought for the Confederacy during the Civil War, being residents of Louisiana; two others fought for the Union. Lincoln personally ordered the release of his son Charles Jonas from a prisoner of war camp to be at his father's bedside before he died.
