= Casement stay =

Component of a casement window

A casement stay is a metal bar used to hold a casement window in a specific open or closed position. Metal windows will normally have the stay included at the time of manufacture, while wooden windows will have them added after fitting.

Different kinds of casement stay include peg type, telescopic and friction

The peg type casement stay has one or two pins or pegs inside the rebate. The stay is a metal bar with holes that fit onto the peg, and allow the sash window to be held open in various positions. The peg nearest the hinge can then be used as a fulcrum. Disadvantages of peg type stays are that the stay handle may protrude dangerously into the room. Another issue is the limited opening that can be achieved. They also rattle in the wind. The mounting plate on the bar connects to the bottom rail of the sash window. The pegs will be connected to a small plate that can be called a pintle plate.

The range of opening depends on the length of the bar and the position of the pins.

There are locks that can put a bolt through a hole in the stay to prevent the window from opening.

Telescopic friction stays are tube shaped and can extend from 11 to 16 inches. They have models for outward opening or inward opening windows. These were invented by Alfred M Lane for the Monarch Metal Weather Strip Company later called Monarch Metal Products Company in St. Louis, Missouri. The tubes maintained their position by friction blocks that applied pressure to the outer tube. The tubes had the advantage of keeping out dirt and water, and having no protruding parts that could harm people. This became known as the Monarch casement stay and cost US$1.50 in 1925.

Another kind of friction stay is in the shape of a bent arm and can allow the window to open to 180°. This can also be called a restrictor stay.

Peg and bar stays have different models that mount vertically or horizontally. Common materials include steel, brass, zinc alloy, nickel and aluminum.

The screw down adjustable stay has a bar that slides through a slot with screw, that can be tightened to hold the window in position. Such a stay will limit the opening to a window.

The handle of the bar in a stay can take on different shapes. The monkey tail has a spiral with over one and a half turns, but the pig tail only does just over one turn. The cockspur handle curves down narrowly. A bulb or ball handle has a hemispherical end on it. The shepherd's crook handle curls around just over 180°. Reeded handles have ridges that help the grip.

Four bar stays combine their function with a hinge, and can shift the window sideways as it opens.

An alternative is the chainwinder.

Installing a casement stay takes about half an hour.
