= Holabird & Root =

American architectural firm

Practice information
- Founded: 1880

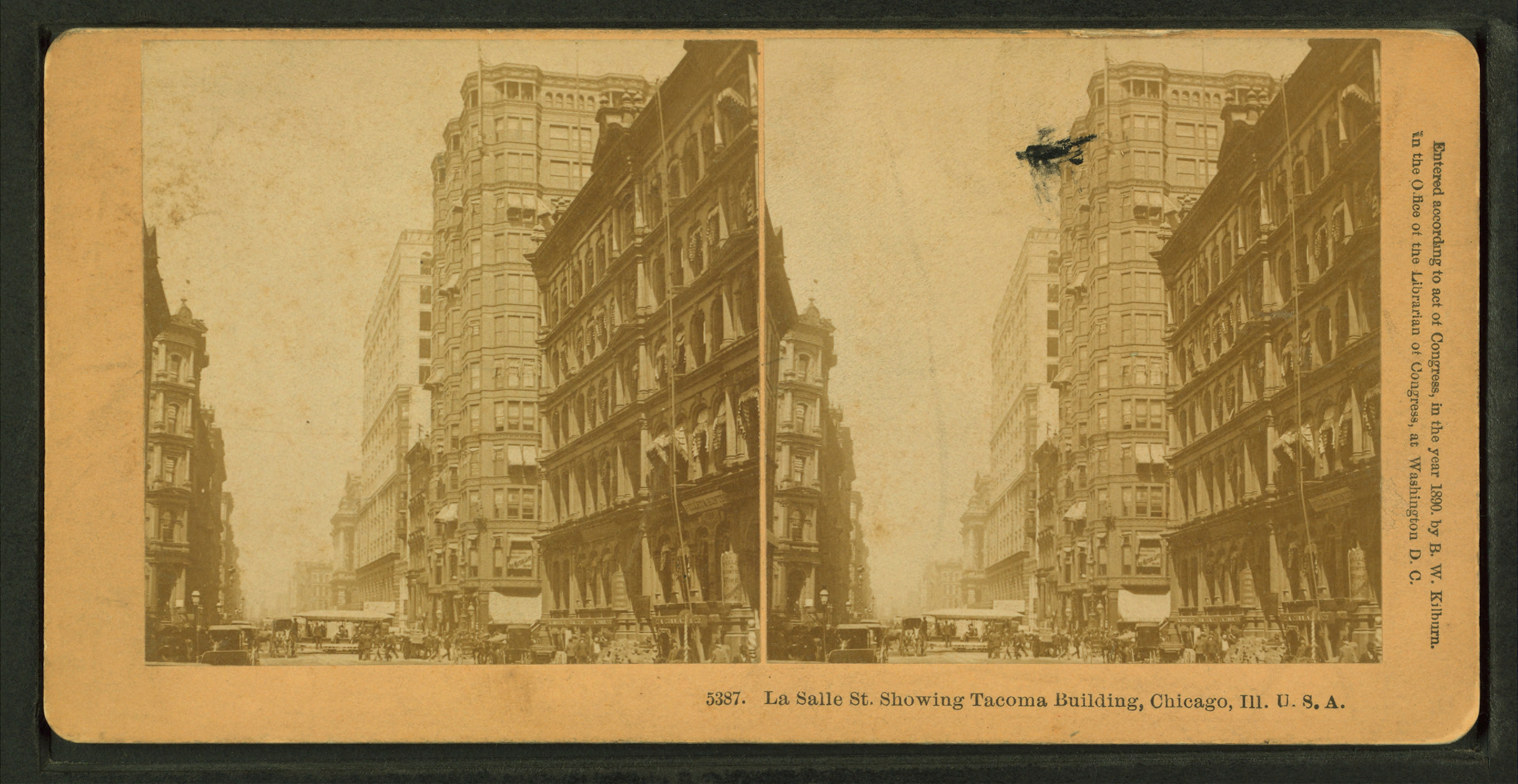
Tacoma Building (the tall building in the centre). Stereoscopic view by Benjamin W. Kilburn

Holabird & Root is an American architectural firm, founded in Chicago in 1880 as Holabird & Simonds. Over the years, the firm has changed its name several times and adapted to new architectural styles, from Chicago School to Art Deco to Modern Architecture to Sustainable Architecture.

Holabird & Root provides architectural, engineering, interior design, and planning services. Chicago's oldest architecture firm, it is a privately held partnership of five principals and four associate principals.

== History ==
The founders, William Holabird and Ossian Cole Simonds, worked in the office of William LeBaron Jenney. They set up their own independent practice, Holabird & Simonds, in 1880 when they took on the project for an extension to Graceland Cemetery, passed on to them by Jenney. In 1881, Martin Roche, who had also worked for Jenney, joined them as a third partner. After only working together on five projects, Simonds left the firm in 1883 to pursue a career as a landscape architect. Holabird, Simonds & Roche became Holabird & Roche. A few years later however, the firm once again collaborated with the ex-partner when, from 1889 to 1895, they designed and built Fort Sheridan, for which Simonds provided the landscaping.

Beginning with the Tacoma Building (completed 1889; demolished 1929), their first major commission, and the Marquette Building (1895), the firm became well known for its groundbreaking Chicago School skyscrapers. An enormously successful practice, they also designed large, ornate hotels across the country, including Chicago's Palmer House, with Richard Neutra in a junior role on the team. Their work was part of the architecture event in the art competition at the 1928 Summer Olympics and the 1932 Summer Olympics.

In 1928, after the deaths of William Holabird (1923) and Martin Roche (1927), the firm was renamed Holabird & Root. The new firm was run by Holabird's son John Augur Holabird and John Wellborn Root Jr., who had both joined back in 1914. Under their leadership, the firm adopted an Art Deco style. The company name changed to Holabird, Root & Burgee for a while, and two further generations of Holabirds served as partners (up to 1987). Currently located in the Marquette Building, the firm is once again called Holabird & Root, though no one of either name is currently affiliated.

== Buildings ==
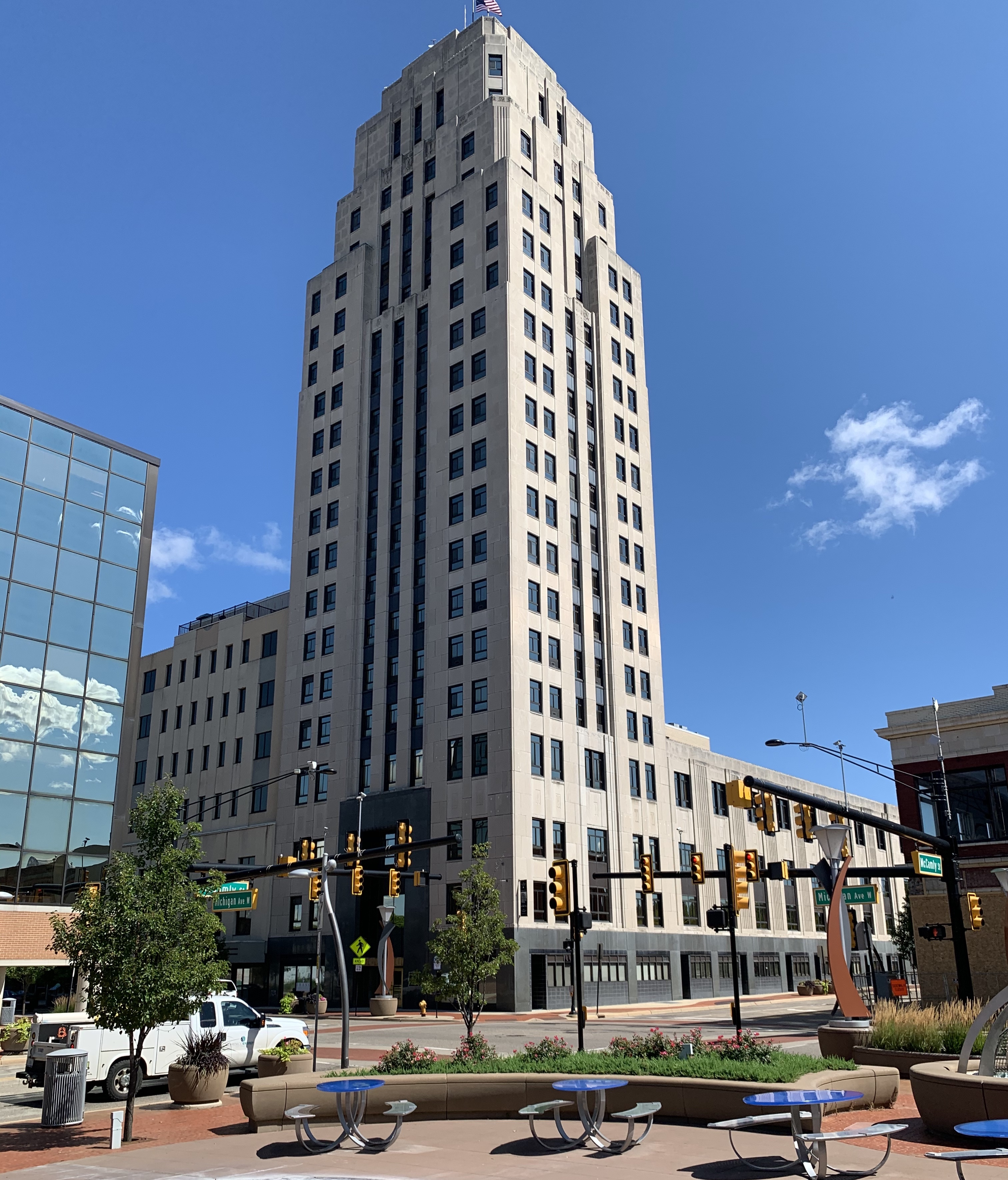
Battle Creek Tower

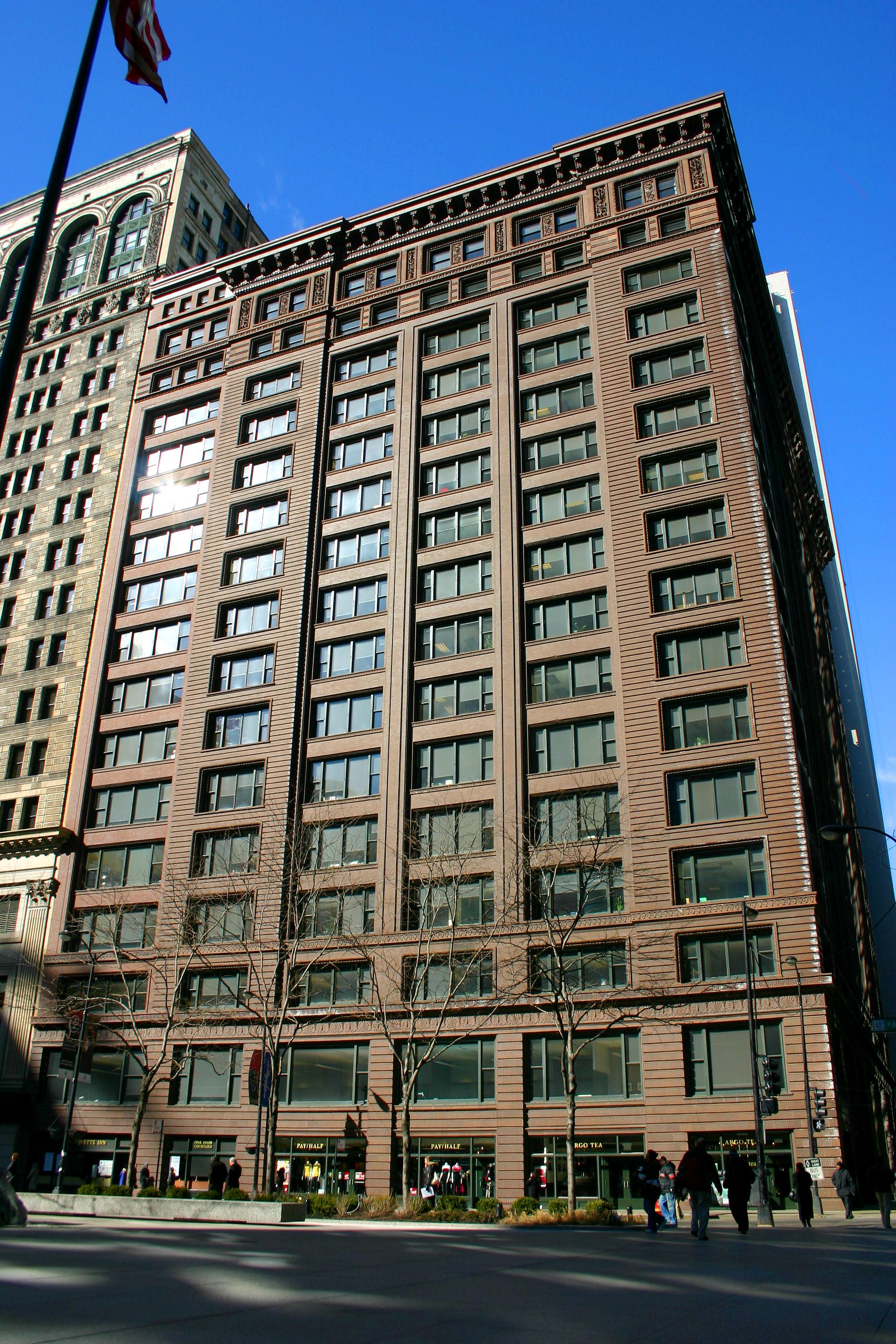
Marquette Building

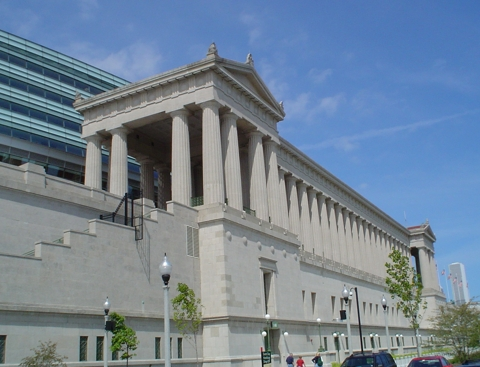
Soldier Field

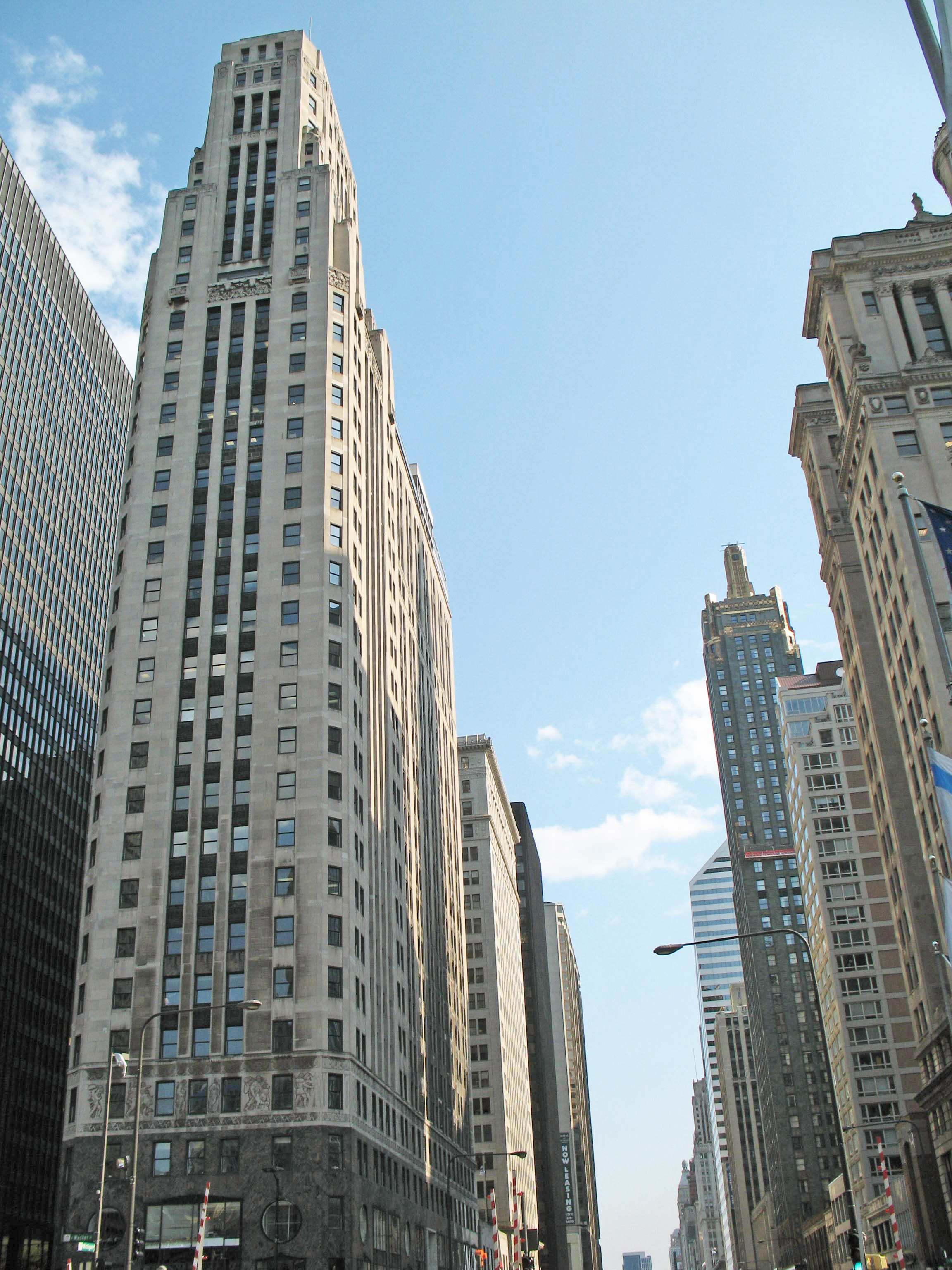
333 North Michigan Building

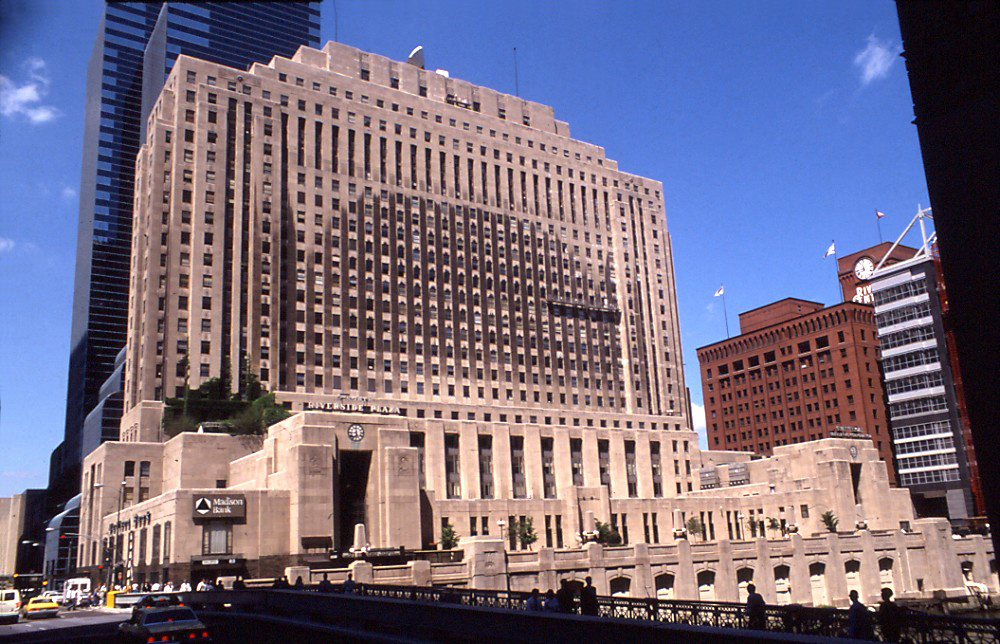
Daily News Building

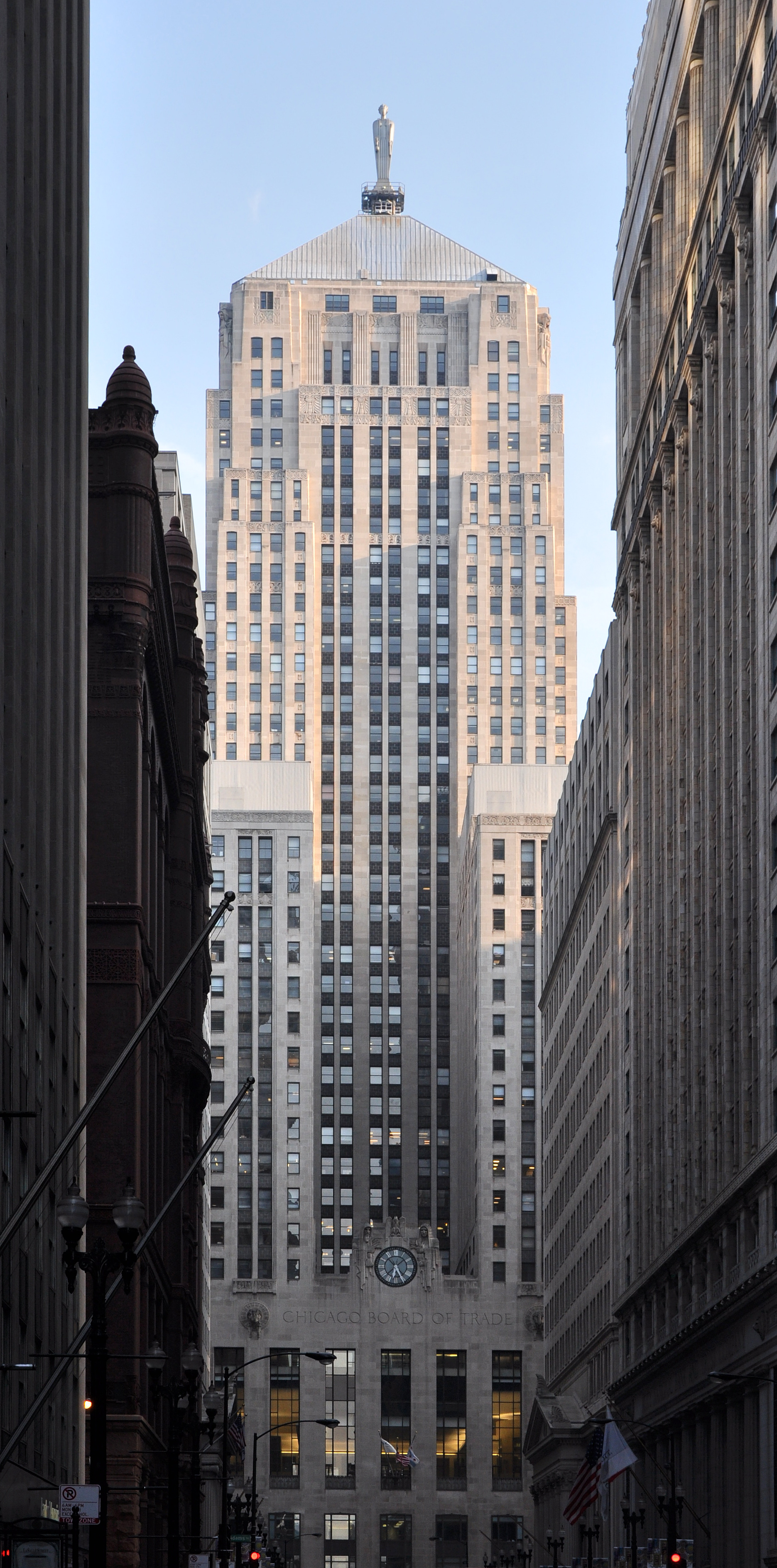
Chicago Board of Trade Building

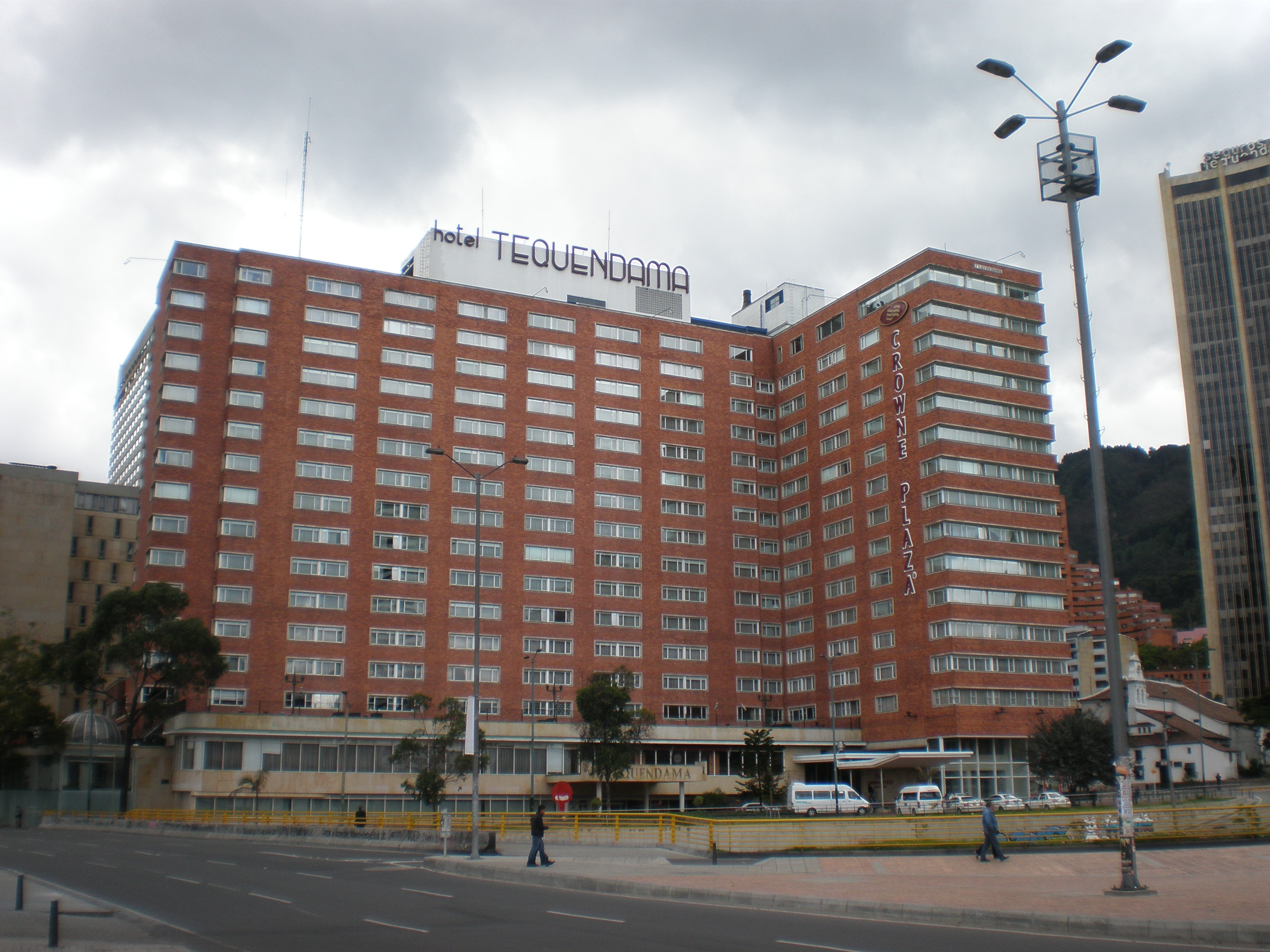
Hotel Tequendama Building

- Graceland Cemetery Chapel, 1888
- Pontiac Building, 1891
- Monadnock Building (southern half), 1893
- McConnell Apartments, 1210 North Astor (Chicago), 1897
- Gage Group Buildings, 1899
- 57 East Jackson Boulevard (Chicago), 1899
- Powers Building, 1902
- Chicago Building, 1904
- Oliver Building, 1907 & 1920
- University Club of Chicago, 1908
- City Hall-County Building, 1910
- North American Building, 36 South State Street (Chicago), 1911
- Sherman House Hotel, 1911
- Century Building, 1915
- Muehlebach Hotel, 1915
- University Laboratory High School (Urbana, Illinois), 1917
- Waterman Building (Chicago), 1920
- Memorial Stadium (Champaign), 1923
- Chicago Temple Building, 1923
- Nicollet Hotel, Minneapolis, Minnesota, 1924
- Soldier Field, 1924
- Palmer House Hotel, 1925
- Evanston Masonic Temple, 1926
- Hotel Wausau, Wausau, Wisconsin, 1925
- Pedestals for Ivan Meštrović's The Bowman and The Spearman statues, 1926
- Stevens Hotel, 1927
- Schroeder Hotel. Milwaukee, 1928
- 333 North Michigan Building, Chicago, Illinois, 1928
- Palmolive Building, Chicago, 1929
- Chicago Daily News Building, Chicago, 1929
- Rand Tower, Minneapolis, Minnesota, 1929
- Chicago Board of Trade Building, Chicago, 1930
- Henry Crown Field House, Chicago, 1931
- University of Illinois Ice Arena, 1931
- Battle Creek Tower, Battle Creek, Michigan, 1931
- Jefferson County Courthouse (Birmingham, Alabama), 1929–32
- Wrigley Field Hand-turned Scoreboard and Center Field Bleachers, 1937
- Mason City Public Library, Mason City, Iowa, 1939
- North Dakota State Capitol Building, Bismarck, North Dakota, 1934
- Statler Hotel Washington, 1943
- Adams County Courthouse, Quincy, 1950
- Morris Inn, University of Notre Dame, 1951
- Hotel Tequendama, Bogotá, Colombia, 1952
- Fisher Hall (University of Notre Dame), 1953
- 1155 E. 60th St (University of Chicago), 1954
- Pangborn Hall (University of Notre Dame), 1955
- One Financial Plaza, Minneapolis, 1960
- Skybridge, City of Davenport, Iowa, 2005
- Ogle County Courthouse Renovation, Oregon, Illinois, 2010
- School of the Art Institute of Chicago Champlain Building Roof and Facade Renovation, Chicago, Illinois, 2012

== Sources ==
- Blaser, Werner. Chicago Architecture: Holabird & Root, 1880–1992. Basel; Boston: Birkhauser Verlag, 1992.
- Bruegmann, Robert. Holabird & Roche/Holabird & Root: An Illustrated Catalog of Works, 1880–1940. New York: Garland Publishing, 1991.
- Bruegmann, Robert. The Architects and the City: Holabird & Roche of Chicago, 1880–1918. Chicago: University of Chicago Press, 1997.
