= Masonic Temple (Chicago) =

Former skyscraper in Chicago, Illinois

Masonic Temple Building
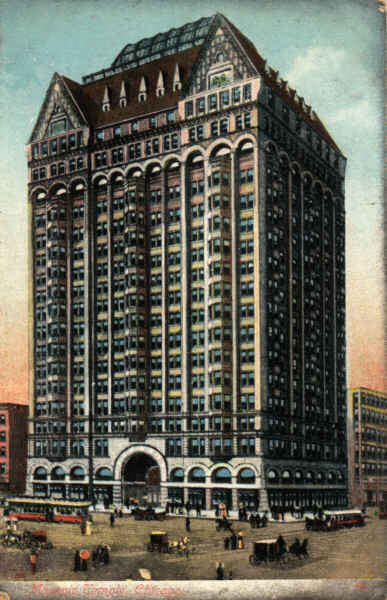
- Former names: Capitol Building

Record height
- Tallest in Chicago from 1895 to 1899^{[I]}

General information
- Status: Demolished
- Type: Commercial offices, retail, and Masonic meeting rooms
- Architectural style: Chicago School
- Location: Chicago, Illinois, United States
- Coordinates: 41°53′05.28″N 87°37′39.27″W
- Construction started: 1891
- Completed: 1892
- Demolished: 1939

Height
- Roof: 302 ft (92 m)

Technical details
- Structural system: Steel frame with wrought-iron wind bracing
- Floor count: 21

Design and construction
- Architect: Burnham and Root

The Masonic Temple Building, later known as the Capitol Building, was a skyscraper built in Chicago, Illinois in 1892, and from 1895 to the 1920s, the tallest building in Chicago.

== History ==
Designed by the firm of Burnham and Root and built at the corner of Randolph and State Streets, the building rose 21 stories. When the clock tower was removed from the Board of Trade Building in 1895, the Masonic Temple became the tallest in the city. The building was owned by Oriental Lodge #33 which still meets to this day.

The building featured a central court ringed by nine floors of shops with offices above and meeting rooms for the Masons at the very top. These meeting rooms also served as theaters, which contributed to the building's obsolescence; its elevators proved inadequate for these crowds, and the building rapidly fell from favor with commercial tenants.

Chicago's building height regulations, enacted in 1892 (the year the Temple was built), did not allow taller buildings, until that was amended in the 1920s. In 1939, the Masonic Temple was demolished, in part due to its poor internal services, but also due to the construction of the new State Street subway, which would have necessitated expensive foundation retrofitting. Also, in 1926 the New Masonic Building had opened nearby. A two-story "taxpayer" housing a Walgreens drug store was erected in its place, and the Joffrey Tower currently stands on the former site of this building.

Both the building's primary designer, John Wellborn Root, and the Masons' primary representative, Norman Gassette, died of natural causes during its construction.

== Gallery ==
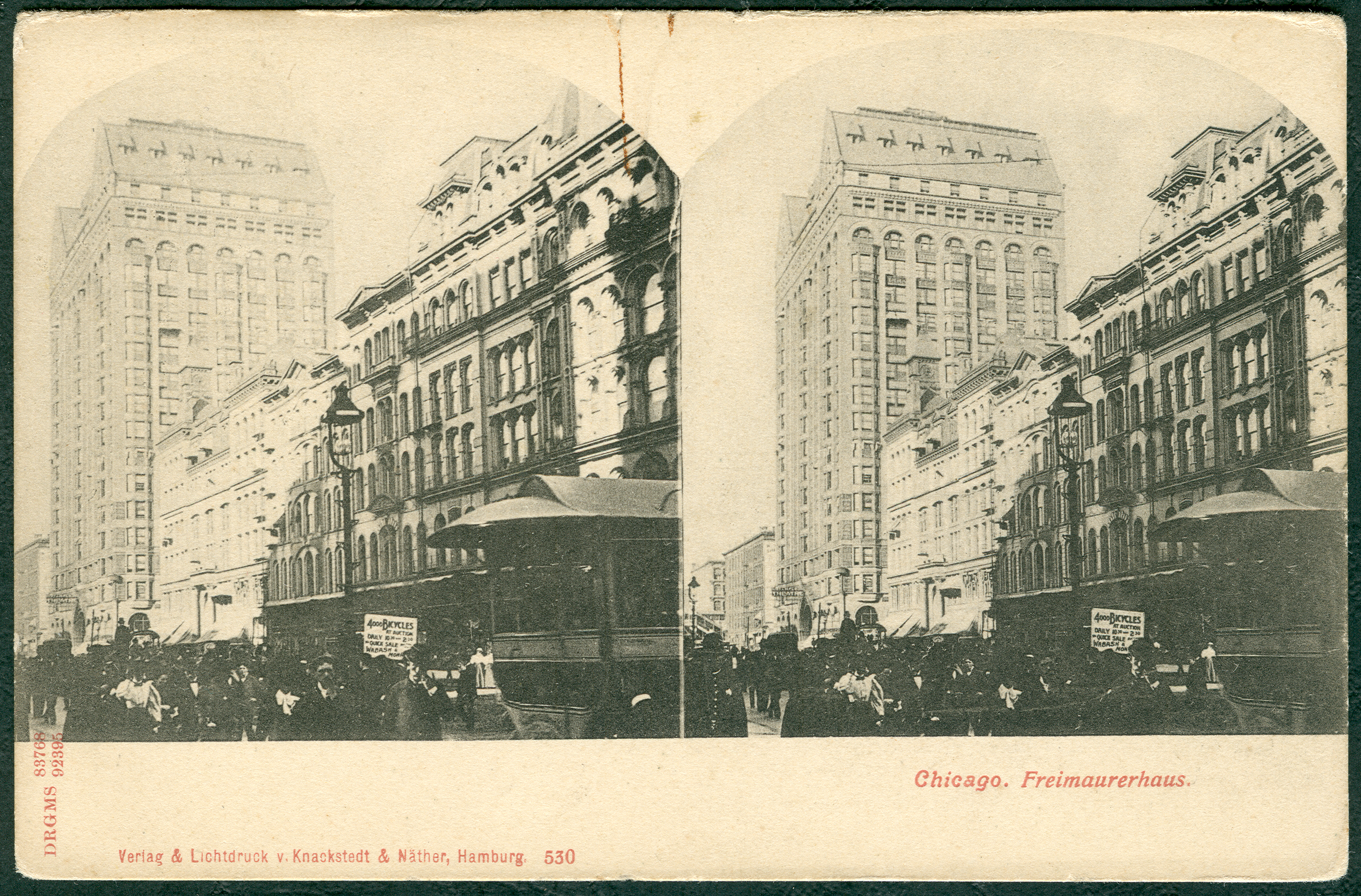
About 1900: Stereoscopy as postcard No. 530 by Knackstedt & Näther (Hamburg)

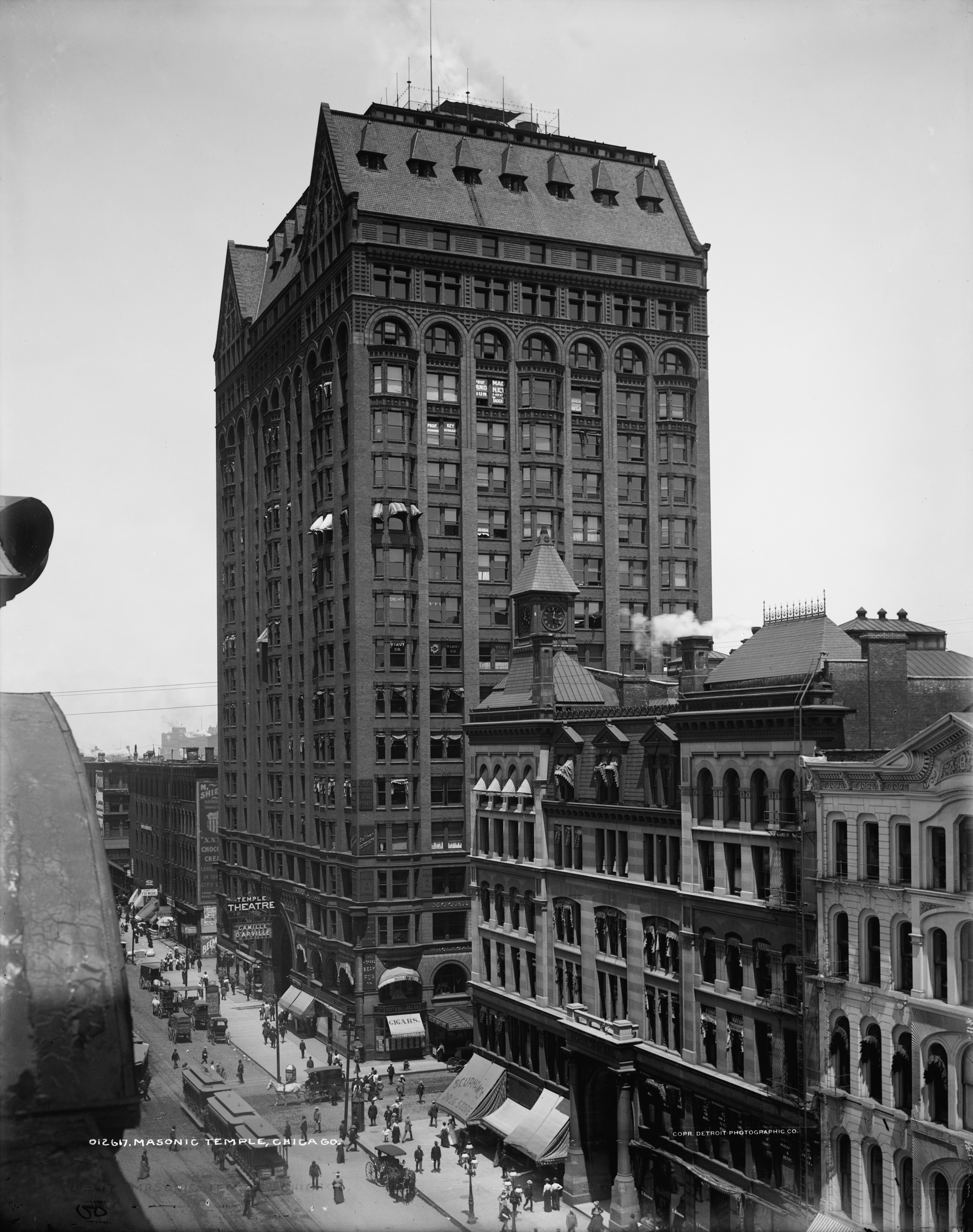
Masonic Temple, 1900

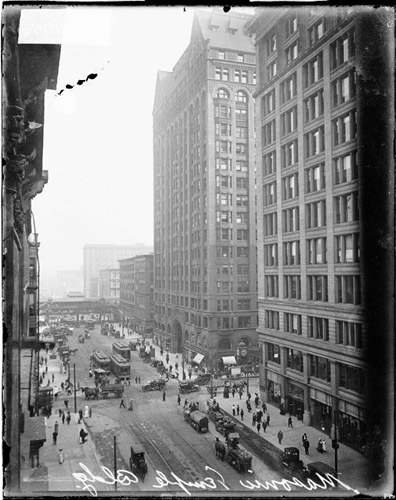
Masonic Temple with new Marshall Field and Company Building, 1911

== See also ==
- Early skyscrapers
- List of tallest buildings in Chicago
- Oriental Lodge #33 Ancient Free and Accepted Masons Chicago, IL
