= Leiter Building =

Leiter Building may refer to:

- First Leiter Building, Washington and Wells Streets, Chicago, built 1879, demolished 1972
- Second Leiter Building, State Street and Ida B. Wells Drive, Chicago, built 1891
