= Henry Siegel =

American businessman

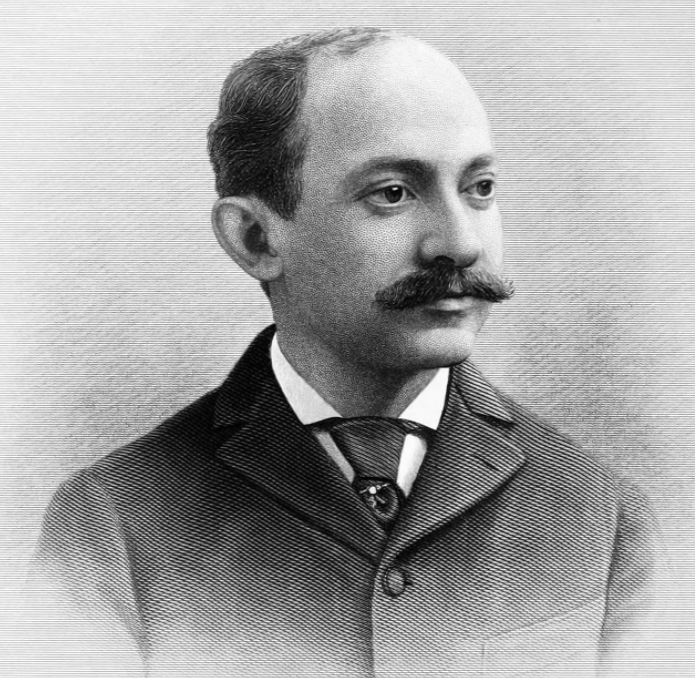
- Born: March 17, 1852; Eubigheim, Kingdom of Württemberg
- Died: August 25, 1930 (aged 78); Lakewood Township, New Jersey, US
- Occupation: Businessman
- Known for: Founder of the Siegel-Cooper Company
- Spouses: Julia Rosenbaum (m. 1885; died 1886) Marie Vaughan Wilde (m. 1898; div. 1918) Henrietta Struble (m. 1918; div. 1927)
- Children: Julia Florence Siegel Cavendish

Signature
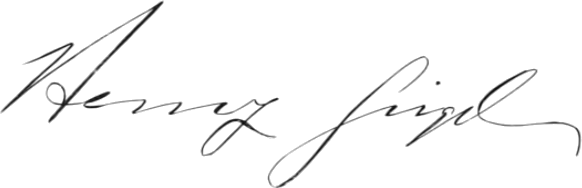

Henry Siegel (March 17, 1852 – August 25, 1930) was an American businessman and co-founder of the Siegel-Cooper Company.

== Early life ==
Siegel was born on March 17, 1852, to a Jewish family in Eubigheim, Kingdom of Württemberg. In 1867, he immigrated to the United States where he worked as a clerk by in Washington, D.C., Parkersburg, West Virginia, and Lawrenceburg, Pennsylvania.

== Career ==
In 1876, he co-founded Siegel, Hartsfield & Company in Chicago. In 1887, he co-founded the Siegel-Cooper Company, also in Chicago, with Frank H. Cooper and Isaac Keim. In 1896, Siegel-Cooper opened a store in New York City in the Ladies' Mile Historic District. In 1902, Henry Siegel sold the company to one of his major stockholders, Captain Joseph B. Greenhut and his son Benedict J. Greenhut, who merged the store with B. Altman across the street in New York City creating a mega-store. In the same year, Siegel bought the Simpson Crawford Company (with one store in New York across the street from Siegel-Cooper) and the Schlesinger and Mayer Company (with one store in Chicago and one store in New York) and moved to New York City. In 1905, Siegel founded The Henry Siegel Company and opened a large store in Boston at 600 Washington Street; he also created a holding company, the Siegel Stores Corporation, as the parent for his retail investments in New York, Chicago, and Boston. In 1913, Siegel-founded banks which had over 15,000 depositors and were operated in conjunction with his stores collapsed. Siegel was convicted and served a short jail sentence for using false financial statements to obtain credit. After he served his sentence, he re-opened a haberdashery with one employee.

== Personal life ==
Siegel married three times. In 1885, he married his first wife, Julia Rosenbaum. Before her death in December 1886, they had one daughter:

- Julia Florence Siegel (1886–1963), who married Tyrell William Cavendish (1875–1912), son of Charles Tyrell Cavendish and grandson of Hon. Richard Cavendish of the British noble Cavendish family; she survived the sinking of the RMS Titanic while her husband perished.

In 1898, he married his second wife, Marie Vaughan Wilde. Marie was the mother of Georgine Wilde, the first wife of Count Carlo Dentice di Frasso. They divorced in 1918.

Also in 1918, he married his third wife, Henrietta Struble, a 40-year-old telephone operator from Geneseo, New York. They divorced in 1927.

Henry Siegel died at Paul Kimball Hospital in Lakewood Township, New Jersey, on August 25, 1930.
