= Siegel-Cooper Company =

Defunct American department store chain

- Company type: Department Store
- Industry: Store
- Founded: 1887
- Founder: Henry Siegel; Frank H. Cooper; Isaac Keim
- Area served: Chicago, New York City, Boston

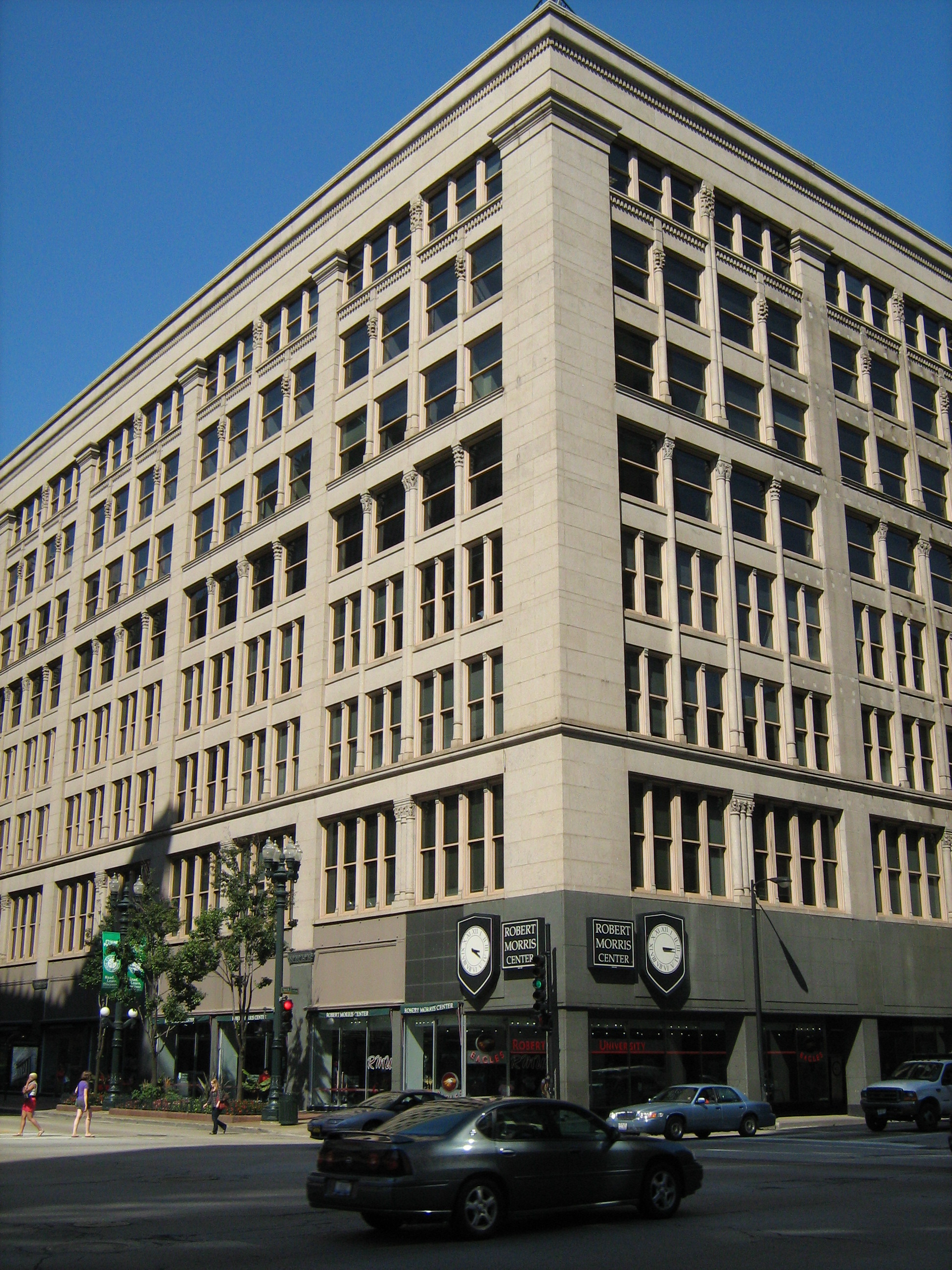
The Second Leiter Building, location of Siegel-Cooper's store in Chicago from 1891 to 1930, later the flagship store of Sears, Roebuck

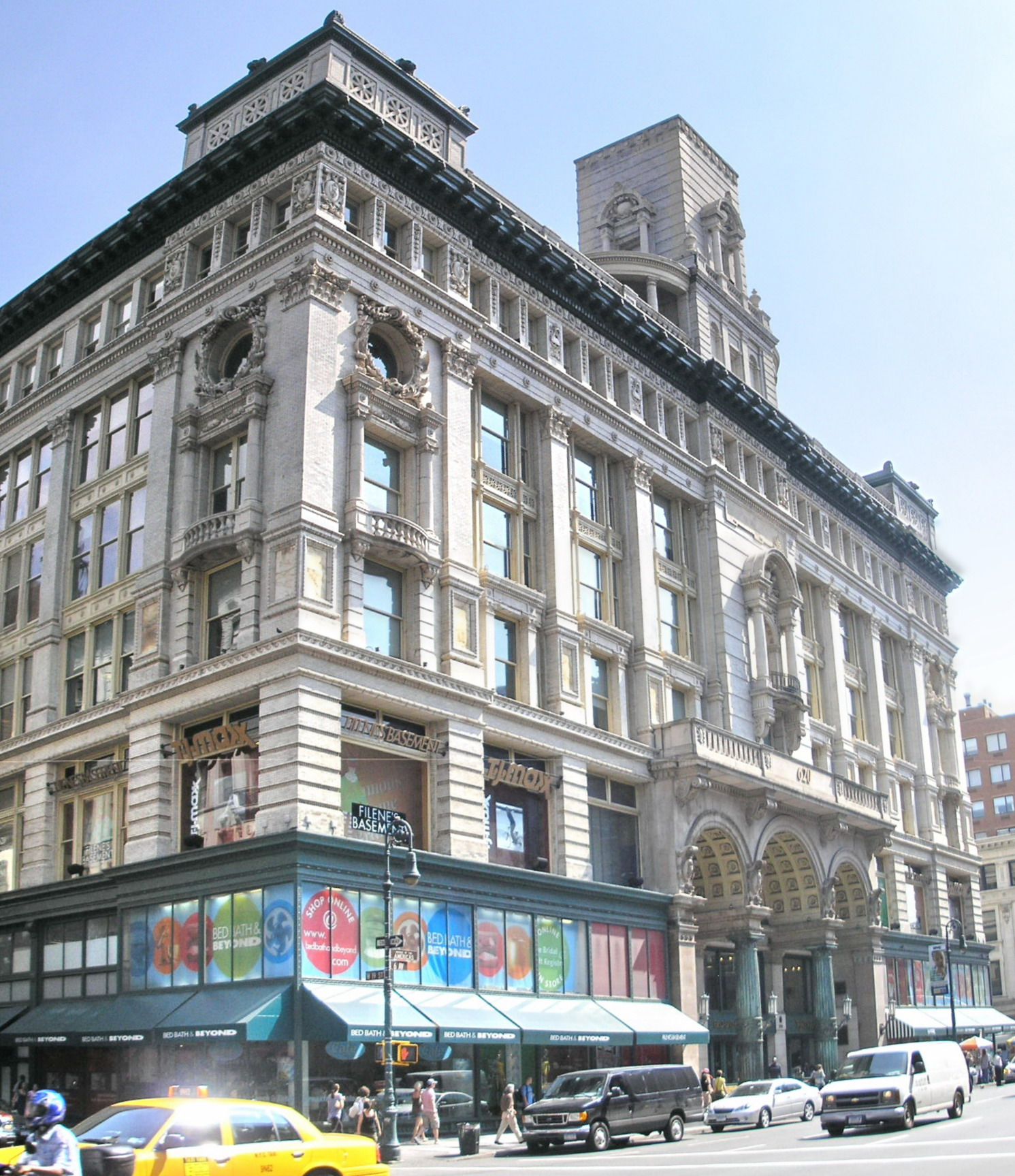
The Siegel-Cooper Building at 616–632 Sixth Avenue in the Flatiron District of Manhattan, New York City, within the Ladies' Mile Historic District

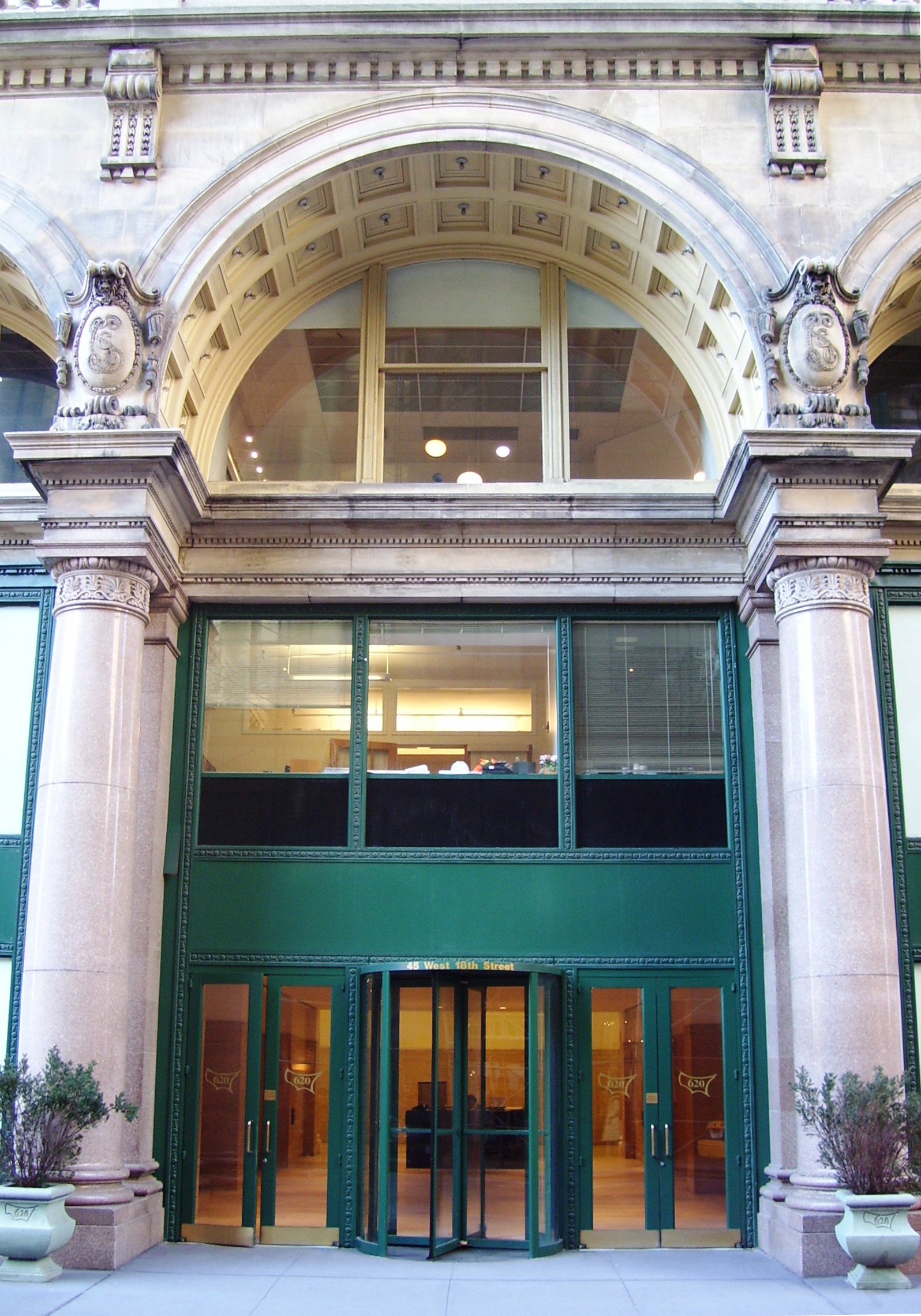
The 18th Street entrance to the New York building

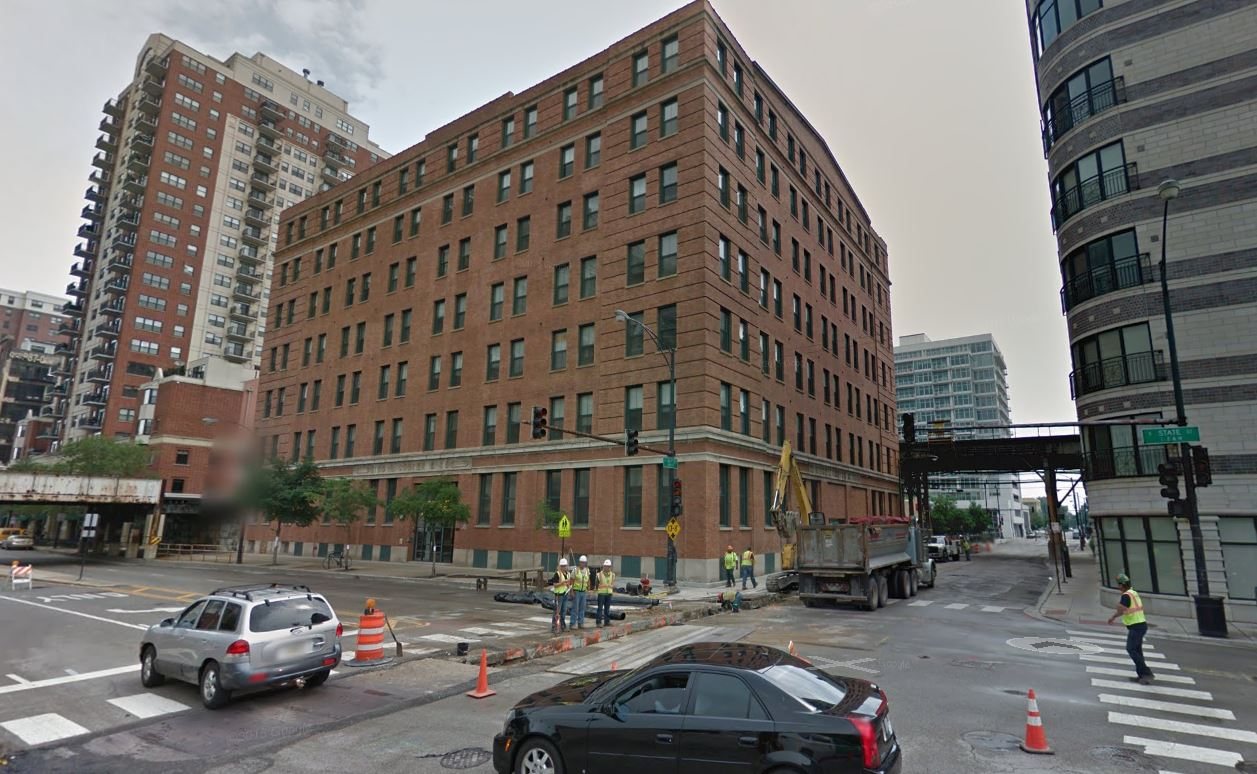
Siegel-Cooper Warehouse, located in the South Loop neighborhood of Chicago at 16th and State St.

The Siegel-Cooper Company was a department store that opened in Chicago in 1887 and expanded into New York City in 1896. At the time of its opening, the New York store was the largest in the world.

== First store in Chicago ==
Siegel-Cooper began as a discount department store on State Street in the Loop. It was founded by Henry Siegel, Frank H. Cooper and Isaac Keim in 1887. Four years later, the store moved into the eight-story Second Leiter Building at State and Van Buren Street, designed by William Le Baron Jenney, where it stayed until 1930, after a 1914-15 reorganization into Associated Dry Goods Corp., but keeping the Siegel-Cooper name in Chicago. The building was then occupied from 1931 to 1986 by Sears, Roebuck & Company. It continues in use, most recently in the 21st century as a college campus.

== Second store in New York City ==
In September 1896, the company opened a store in New York City, a huge emporium in the Ladies' Mile Shopping District, joining the other major department stores in the neighborhood. Their steel-framed building, the first department store in New York to be so constructed, was the largest store in the world at the time, and was designed in Beaux-Arts style by DeLemos & Cordes, who would go on to design the R. H. Macy's store in Herald Square, which then took the title of largest. The six-story building of the former Siegel-Cooper store is located at 616-632 Sixth Avenue between West 18th and 19th Streets, and was built between 1895 and 1897, then expanded in 1899.

The steel-framed construction of the "Big Store", as it was called at the time, enabled the building to have large interior spaces with uninterrupted selling floors, and allowed for skylit courts. Siegel-Cooper took full advantage of the novelty – to New York City – of steel-framing by advertising the building as "the only and absolutely fire-proof and perfectly safe store in New York City."

The store offered a wide variety of dry goods in its 18 acres (7 ha.), as well as other amenities such as a grocery department, barber shop, theatre, telegraph office, art gallery, photo studio, bank, dental office, a 350-person restaurant, and a conservatory which sold live plants. The main floor featured a copy of Daniel Chester French's statue The Republic inside a marble-enclosed fountain. This was a popular meeting place, giving rise to the phrase "Meet me at the fountain," which the store used as a slogan, along with "A City in Itself" and "Everything Under the Sun".

At its peak, the store employed over 3,000 people, mostly girls and women, and offered its employees an infirmary, a parlor and a gymnasium. The company also published a newspaper for its workers, called Thought and Work.

== Third store in Boston ==
In 1905, The Henry Siegel Company opened a large store in Boston, at 600 Washington Street. The Boston store was converted into an office building and a movie theater in 1915. The light court on Washington Street was infilled in the 1970s, and the theater closed in the 1990s. The building was further modified to create a new entrance to the MBTA Orange Line Chinatown station in 2004. The building is now home to Commonwealth of Massachusetts offices and small retailers. The fate of the disused theater is undecided.

== Decline, closing and renewal ==
In 1902, Henry Siegel sold the company to one of his major stockholders, Captain Joseph B. Greenhut and his son Benedict J. Greenhut, who merged the store with B. Altman across the street in New York City, creating a mega-store which was ultimately unsuccessful. In 1913–14 J.P. Morgan was involved in combining the company with other retailers as the Associated Dry Goods Corp. Siegel-Cooper declared bankruptcy in 1915, and the New York store closed in 1917, becoming a military hospital during World War I and then a warehouse.

The Chicago store closed around 1930, and that building was taken over by Sears, Roebuck as their flagship store in 1931. In the 21st century, it is the Chicago campus of Robert Morris University Illinois.

After decades of miscellaneous use as a warehouse, the NBC Television scene shop and the location "The Door", a social services center, the New York building become one of the first of the great dry-goods emporia in the Ladies' Mile to be renovated and re-opened for retail use. Calling itself "The Anchor of the Avenue", the building's retail tenants as of August, 2021 included Bed, Bath & Beyond, T.J. Maxx, and Marshalls.

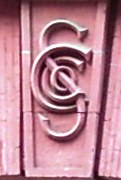
The Siegel-Cooper monogram from a former warehouse building on 17th Street

== See also ==
- Ladies' Mile Historic District
