= Chicago school (architecture) =

American architectural style

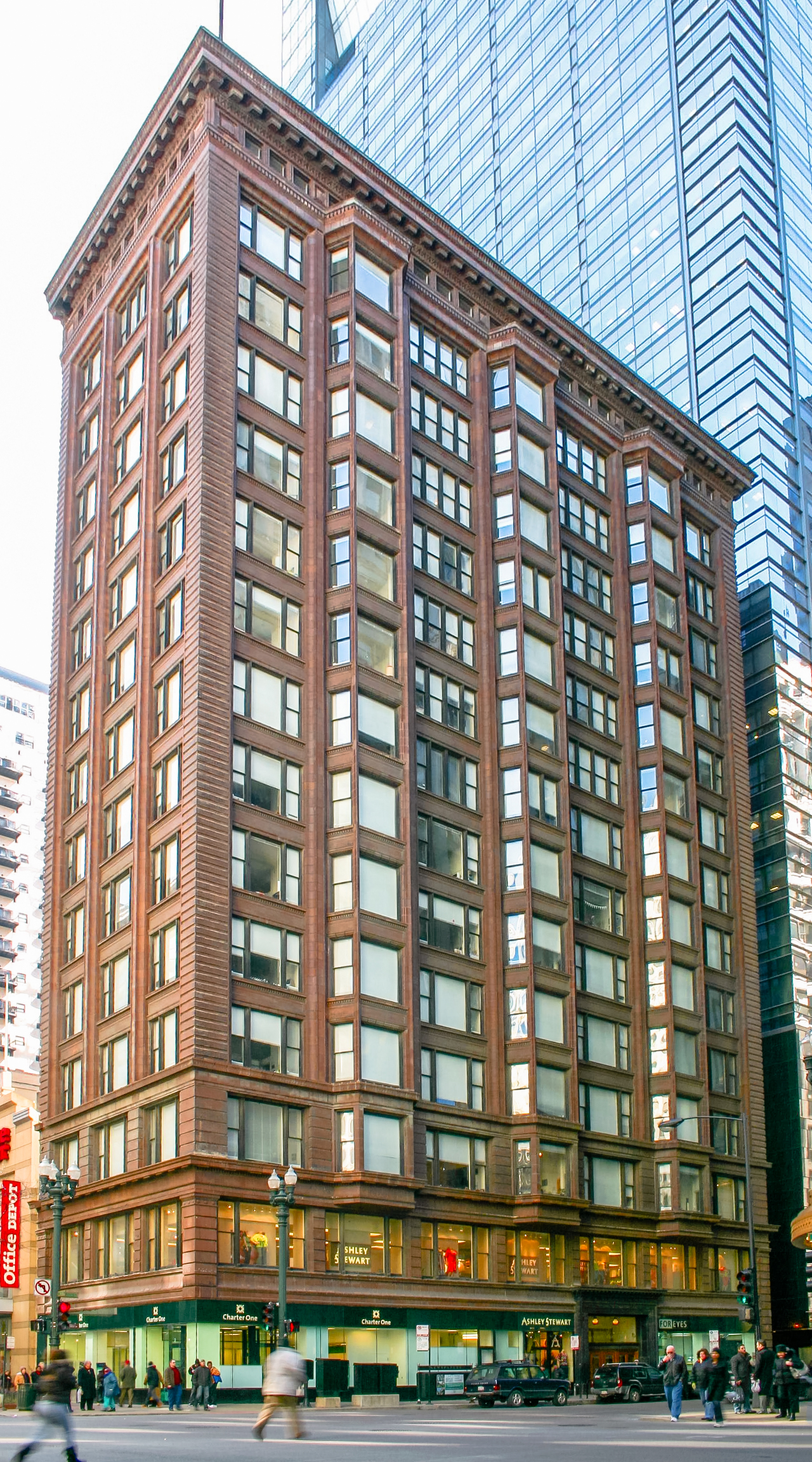
The Chicago Building by Holabird & Roche (1904–1905) is a prime example of the Chicago School, displaying both variations of the Chicago window

The Chicago School refers to two architectural styles derived from the architecture of Chicago. In the history of architecture, the first Chicago School was a school of architects active in Chicago in the late 19th, and at the turn of the 20th century. They were among the first to promote the new technologies of steel-frame construction in commercial buildings, and developed a spatial esthetic which co-evolved with, and then came to influence, parallel developments in European Modernism. Much of its early work influenced the subsequent Commercial Style.

A "Second Chicago School" with a modernist esthetic emerged in the 1940s through 1970s, which pioneered new building technologies and structural systems, such as the tube-frame structure.

== First Chicago School ==
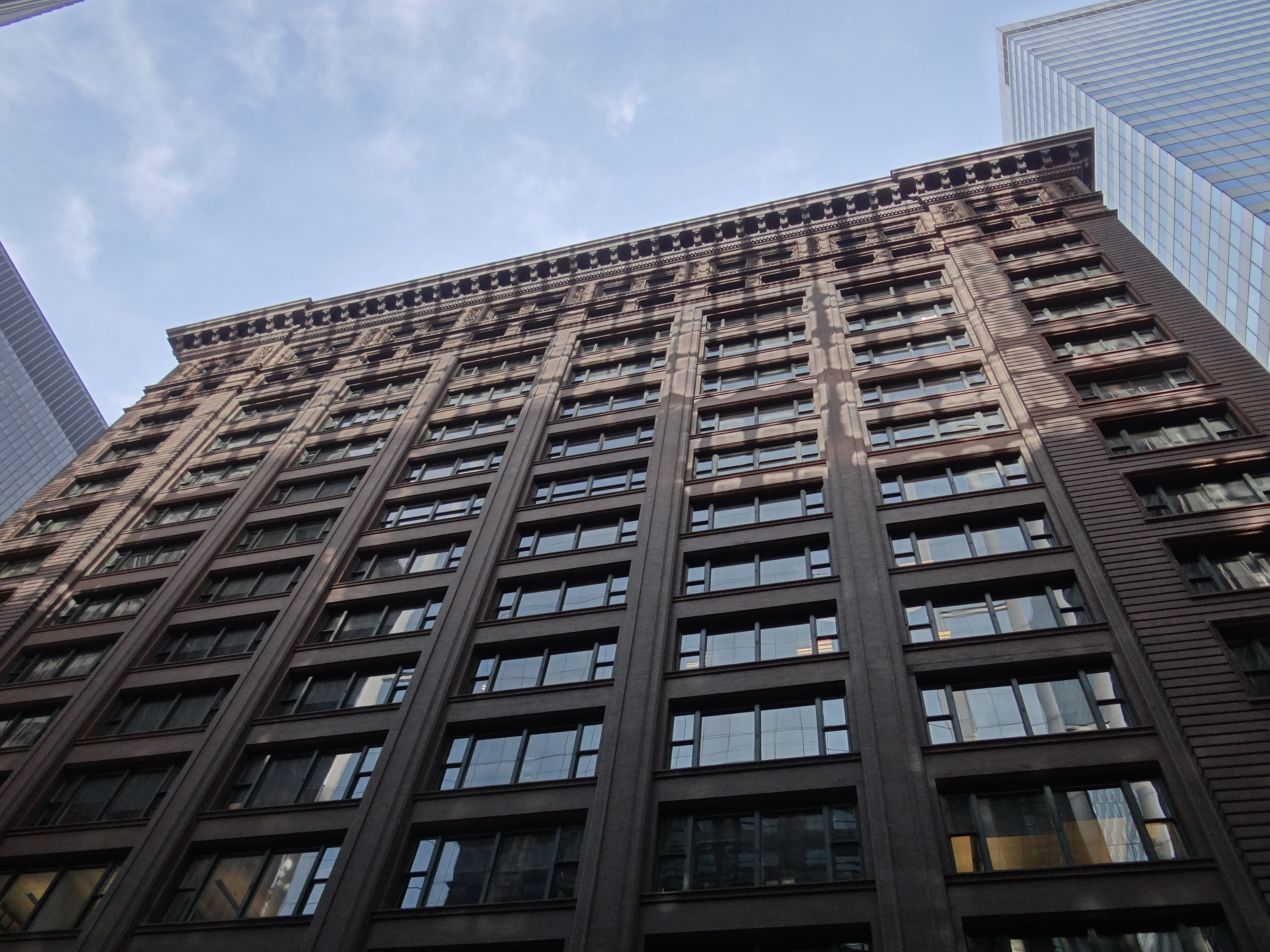
Historically unprecedented grid of wide windows, clear expression of structural frame, and minimalist ornamentation on the Marquette Building (1895).

While the term "Chicago School" is widely used to describe buildings constructed in the city during the 1880s and 1890s, this term has been disputed by scholars, in particular in reaction to Carl Condit's 1952 book The Chicago School of Architecture. Historians such as H. Allen Brooks, Winston Weisman and Daniel Bluestone have pointed out that the phrase suggests a unified set of esthetic or conceptual precepts, when, in fact, Chicago buildings of the era displayed a wide variety of styles and techniques. Erroneously, critics of the Chicago School iterated that publications before 1900 used the phrase "Commercial Style" to describe the innovative tall buildings of the era, rather than proposing any sort of unified "school". However, research completed in 2016 demonstrates that the term “Chicago school” was used in the public media and known by the general public since the 1880s. In 1900, the term was used in the first American-published textbook of architecture and it referred to skyscrapers, as pointed out by Dan C. Baciu in an article in the Journal of Architecture. The critique against the “Chicago School” by 20th and 21st-century scholars appears to be an example of poorly informed mock attack.

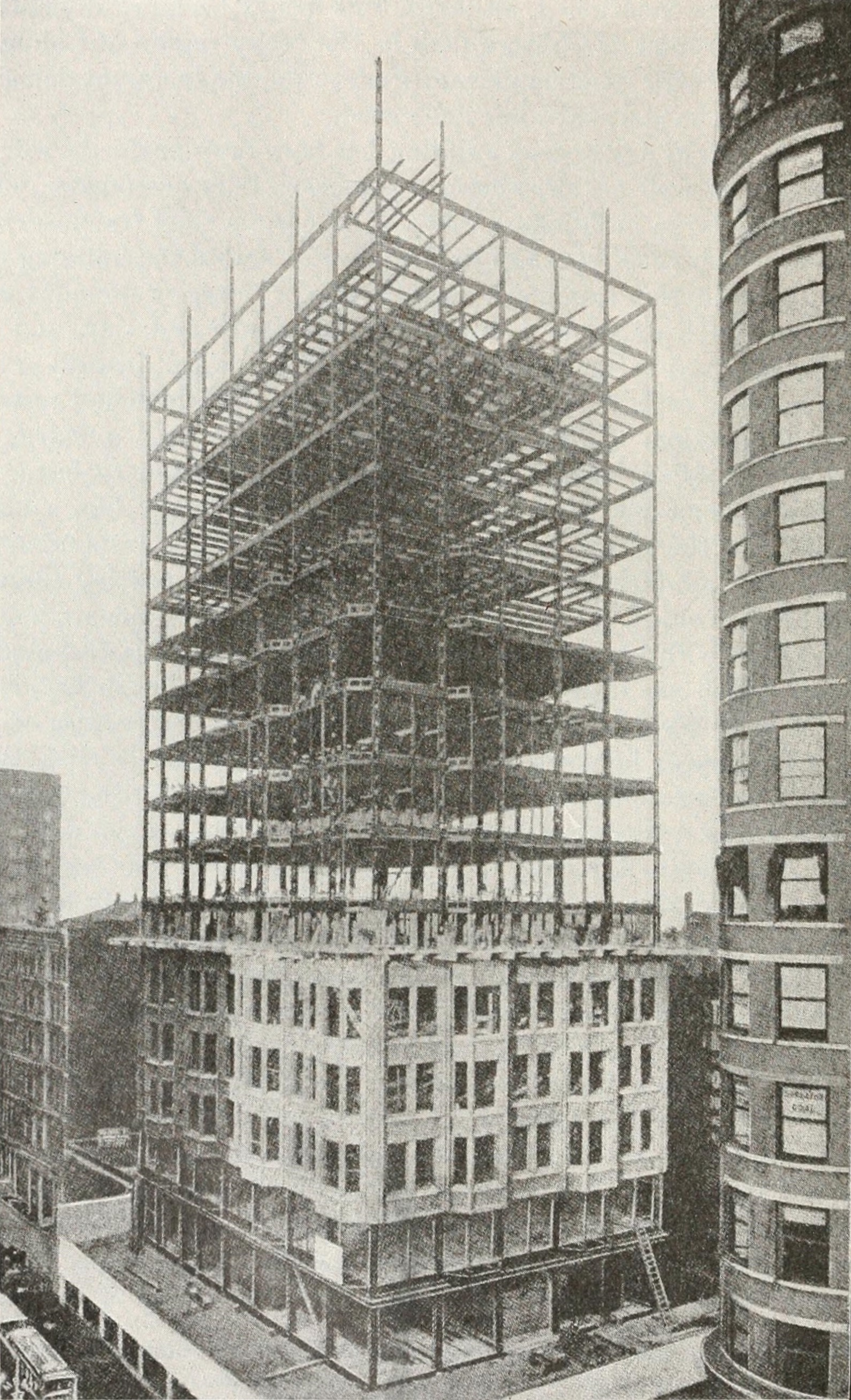
A steel skeletal frame, like that of the Fisher Building (built 1895–1896, and still standing), meant the height of a building was no longer limited by the strength of its walls.

Some of the distinguishing features of the Chicago School are the use of steel-frame buildings with masonry cladding (usually terracotta), allowing large plate-glass window areas and limiting the amount of exterior ornamentation. Sometimes elements of neoclassical architecture are used in Chicago School skyscrapers. Many Chicago School skyscrapers contain the three parts of a classical column. The lowest floors functions as the base, the middle stories, usually with little ornamental detail, act as the shaft of the column, and the last floor or two, often capped with a cornice and often with more ornamental detail, represent the capital.

The "Chicago window" originated in this school. It is a three-part window consisting of a large fixed center panel flanked by two smaller double-hung sash windows. The arrangement of windows on the facade typically creates a grid pattern, with some projecting out from the facade forming bay windows. The Chicago window combined the functions of light-gathering and natural ventilation; a single central pane was usually fixed, while the two surrounding panes were operable. These windows were often deployed in bays, known as oriel windows, that projected out over the street.

Architects whose names are associated with the Chicago School include Henry Hobson Richardson, Dankmar Adler, Daniel Burnham, William Holabird, William LeBaron Jenney, Martin Roche, John Root, Solon S. Beman, and Louis Sullivan. Frank Lloyd Wright started in the firm of Adler and Sullivan but created his own Prairie Style of architecture.

The Home Insurance Building, which some regarded as the first skyscraper in the world, was built in Chicago in 1885 and was demolished in 1931.

=== Buildings in Chicago ===
Photo	Name	Year
	Leiter I Building	1879
	Montauk Building	1882–1883
	Rookery Building	1886
	Auditorium Building	1889
	Leiter II Building	1891
	Ludington Building	1891–1892
	Monadnock Building	1891–1893
	Reliance Building	1890–1895
	Marquette Building	1895
	Fisher Building	1895–1896
	Gage Group Buildings	1898
	Sullivan Center	1899
	Heyworth Building	1904
	Chicago Building	1904–1905
	Brooks Building	1910
	Transportation Building/Heisen Building	1910–1911

=== Buildings outside Chicago ===
Photo	Name	Year	Localization
	Wainwright Building	1891	St. Louis, Missouri
	Mills Building and Tower	1892	San Francisco, California
	Goodspeed Brothers Building	1895	Grand Rapids, Michigan
	Guaranty Building	1896	Buffalo, New York
	Union Bank Building	1904	Winnipeg, Manitoba, Canada
	Blount Building	1907	Pensacola, Florida
	Consultancy House	1910	Dunedin, New Zealand
	Old National Bank Building	1910	Spokane, Washington
	Swetland Building	1910	Cleveland, Ohio
	Kearns Building	1911	Salt Lake City, Utah
	St. James Building	1912	Jacksonville, Florida
	Western Auto Building	1914	Kansas City, Missouri
	McLeod Building	1915	Edmonton, Alberta, Canada
	LifeSavers Building	1920	Port Chester, NY
	Citizens' Trust Company Building	1922	Terre Haute, IN
	Banco Pastor Building	1925	A Coruña, Spain
	Nicholas Building	1926	Melbourne, Australia

== Second Chicago School ==
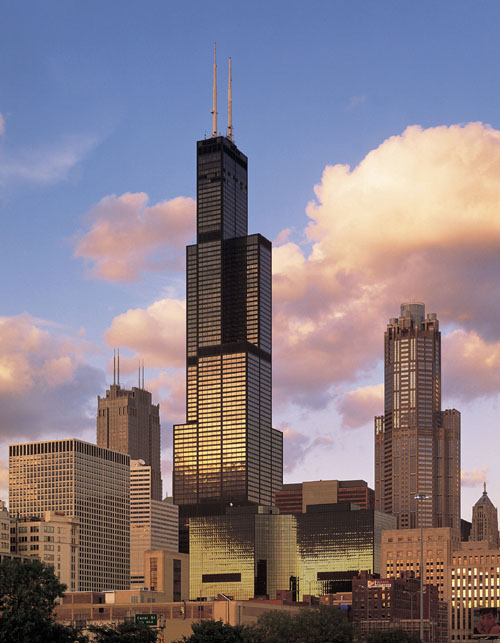
Willis Tower, completed in 1973, introduced the bundled tube structural system and was the world's tallest building until 1998

In the 1940s, a "Second Chicago School" emerged from the work of Ludwig Mies van der Rohe and his efforts of education at the Illinois Institute of Technology in Chicago. Mies sought to concentrate on neutral architectural forms instead of historicist ones, and the standard Miesian building is characterized by the presence of large glass panels and the use of steel for vertical and horizontal members.

The Second Chicago School's first and purest expression was the 860–880 Lake Shore Drive Apartments (1951) and their technological achievements. The structural engineer for the Lake Shore Drive Apartments project was Georgia Louise Harris Brown, who was the first African-American to receive an architecture degree from the University of Kansas, and second African-American woman to receive an architecture license in the United States.

Skidmore, Owings & Merrill, a Chicago-based architectural firm, was the first to erect buildings conforming to the features of the Second Chicago School. Myron Goldsmith, Bruce Graham, Walter Netsch, and Fazlur Khan were among its most influential architects. The Bangladeshi-born structural engineer Khan introduced a new structural system of framed tubes in skyscraper design and construction. The tube structure, formed by closely spaced interconnected exterior columns, resists "lateral forces in any direction by cantilevering from the foundation." About half the exterior surface is available for windows. Where larger openings like garage doors are required, the tube frame must be interrupted, with transfer girders used to maintain structural integrity. The first building to apply the tube-frame construction was the DeWitt-Chestnut Apartment Building, which Khan designed and was completed in Chicago by 1963. This laid the foundations for the tube structures of many other later skyscrapers, including his own John Hancock Center and Willis Tower.

Today, there are different styles of architecture all throughout the city, such as the Chicago School, neo-classical, art deco, modern, and postmodern.

== See also ==
- Architecture of Chicago
- Chicago Landmarks
- Early Commercial architecture
- Chicago Seven (architects)
- Palazzo style architecture
