= Joseph B. Greenhut =

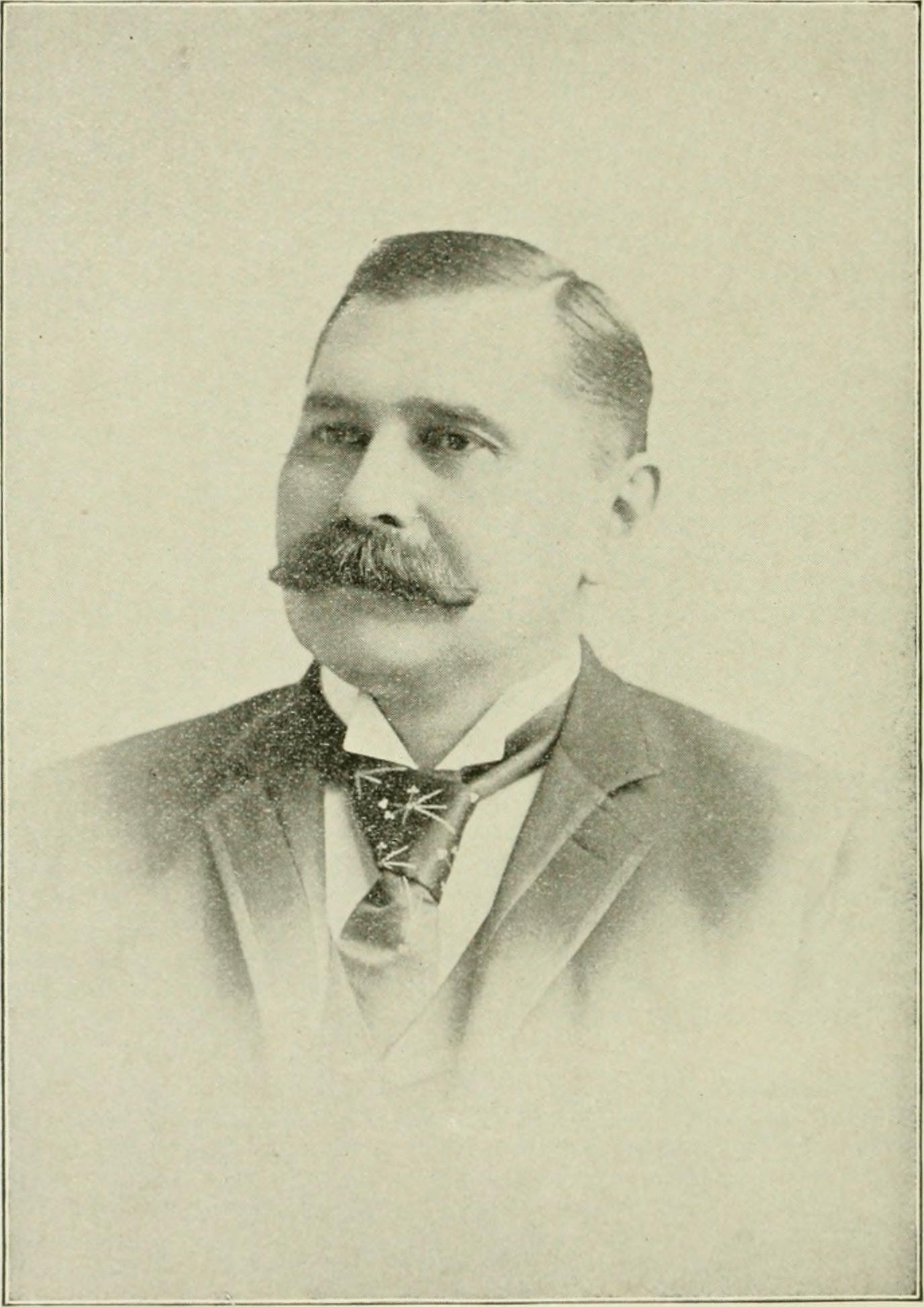
- Born: Joseph Benedict Greenhut; February 28, 1843; Bischofteinitz, Austrian Empire
- Died: November 17, 1918 (aged 75); New York
- Burial place: Salem Fields Cemetery
- Spouse: Clara Wolfner (m. 1866)
- Children: Fannie V., Benedict J., and Nelson W. Benedict
- Military career
- Allegiance: Union
- Branch: 12th Illinois Infantry Regiment
- Service years: 1861-1864
- Parents: Benedict Greenhut (father); Mina Greenhut (mother)

Joseph Benedict Greenhut (February 28, 1843 – November 17, 1918) was an Austrian Empire-born Jewish-American soldier and merchant.

== Early life ==
Greenhut was born on February 28, 1843, in Bischofteinitz, Austrian Empire, the son of Benedict and Mina Greenhut.

Greenhut's father died when he was four, and his mother later married Wolf Schaefer. He immigrated to America when he was nine and lived in Chicago, Illinois. He began learning tin and copper smithing when he was thirteen and spent some time working for different firms in St. Louis, Missouri. He then went South and spent two years in Mobile, Alabama.

== Military career ==
He returned to Chicago in March 1861, when the American Civil War began, and following President Abraham Lincoln first call for troops he enlisted as a private of the 12th Illinois Infantry on April 17, the second person to enlist from Chicago.

Greenhut was promoted to sergeant in August 1861. He served with the 12th Illinois through various campaigns in Kentucky and Tennessee under General Ulysses S. Grant. In February 1862, while fighting in the Battle of Fort Donelson and storming the fort shortly before its surrender, he was badly wounded in the right arm and retired from the 12th shortly afterwards. In August 1862, he was appointed captain of Company K, 82nd Illinois Infantry. He fought with the 82nd in various campaigns and battles in Virginia under Generals Ambrose Burnside, Joseph Hooker, and George Meade, including the Battle of Gettysburg in July 1863. He was then transferred to the general staff of Brigade Commander Friedrich Hecker and appointed Adjutant-General of the brigade. After Gettysburg, the brigade was transferred to the Western army and sent to relieve General William Rosecrans, who was surrounded in Chattanooga, Tennessee. The brigade fought in the Battle of Wauhatchie while opening communications with Rosecrans. The brigade also fought in the Battles of Missionary Ridge, Lookout Mountain, and Knoxville. He resigned from the army on February 24, 1864. He received the brevet rank of colonel upon his resignation. When the Gettysburg Battlefield was declared a national park in 1892, he was one of the commissioners in charge of erecting a monument for Illinois soldiers who fought there. Fifty years after Gettysburg, the Secretary of War sent him a letter of thanks for his actions on the second day: he led fifty volunteers to dislodge Confederate sharpshooters who were picking off gunners and officers from houses.

== Post-military career ==
Following his resignation from the military, Greenhut began working on mechanical pursuits in Chicago. He invented and patented, among other mechanical devices, the twine-binder used on McCormick reaping machines. In 1869, he became secretary and treasurer of the Keller Distilling Company of Chicago. In 1887, at the unanimous request of all American distillers, he organized the Distillers' and Cattle Feeders' Company and served as its president until 1895, when differences between Eastern and Western stockholders led him to withdraw from the company. He moved to Peoria at some point and became commercially active there, serving as an officer and director of the Central Railway Company (later known as the Peoria Railroad Company), the Commercial German-American National Bank, the Merchants National Bank, and the National Bank of the Republic of Chicago. He was also president of the National Cooperage and Woodenware Company of Peoria, one of the largest enterprises of its kind in the country. Greenhut and his business partners started the Great Western Distillery in Peoria, which was the largest in the world at that time. Greenhut's home was on the corner of Moss Avenue and Sheridan Road.

Greenhut lived in New York City, New York, for the last twenty years of his life. There, he became president of the Siegel-Cooper Company. Siegel-Cooper began operating its store in 1896, with 150,000 people in for the public exhibition on the opening night. In 1902, he bought out Henry Siegel. In 1907, he and former Ambassador to Turkey Henry Morgenthau opened a new store called Greenhut & Co. Siegel-Cooper and Greenhut were consolidated under the former name in 1910, and in 1914 the failure of Henry Siegel led the firm to be renamed the J. B. Greenhut Company. It failed in 1915, although it was reorganized and continued to do business until March 1918, when it was decided to liquidate and discontinue the business. He remained president of the company until March 1917, when he retired.

Greenhut was a director of the Montefiore Home and a member of the Royal Arch Masonry, the Chamber of Commerce, B'nai B'rith, the Grand Army of the Republic, and the Loyal Legion. In 1866, he married Clara Wolfner of Chicago. Their children were Fannie V., Benedict J., and Nelson W. Benedict was secretary and treasurer of Siegel-Cooper.

== Death ==
Greenhut died at home from heart disease on November 17, 1918. Rabbi Joseph Silverman delivered the eulogy at his funeral at Congregation Emanu-El of New York, and former Department Commander of the Grand Army of the Republic in New York General George B. Loud spoke about Greenhut's military service and laid a wreath and a flag from the Legion of Honor on his coffin. The honorary pallbearers were Jacob H. Schiff, Henry Morgenthau, former New York Supreme Court Justice David Leventritt, Isador Saks, Charles Strauss, and Elias Summerfield. He was buried in Salem Fields Cemetery in Cypress Hills.

== Legacy ==
The Grand Army of the Republic Memorial Hall in Peoria, Illinois was dedicated to Greenhut. He donated $10,000 to the construction efforts.
