= Siegel Stores Corporation =

Holding company based in New York and Massachusetts

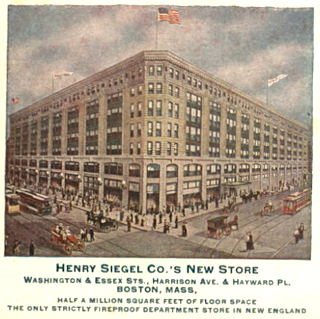
Henry Siegel Co. at Washington and Essex, Boston, 1910s

Siegel Stores Corporation was a holding company based in Manhattan, New York and Boston, Massachusetts. The business concern became bankrupt in December 1913. Judge Charles Merrill Hough of the southern district of New York, United States District Court appointed John S. Sheppard Jr. and William A. Marble as receivers. Siegel Stores Corporation was incorporated in Delaware in 1909. The gross business of the corporation was approximately $40,000,000 at the time of its failure.

The holding firm controlled a 14th Street (Manhattan) store and Simpson - Crawford (incorporated in 1910), in New York City, for the Henry Siegel Company of Boston. Siegel managed four stores and was president of Siegel Stores Corporation. The insolvency came following an equity suit against Siegel Stores Corporation brought by the Merchants Express Company.
