= Goodspeed Brothers Building =

Commercial structure in Grand Rapids

- U.S. National Register of Historic Places
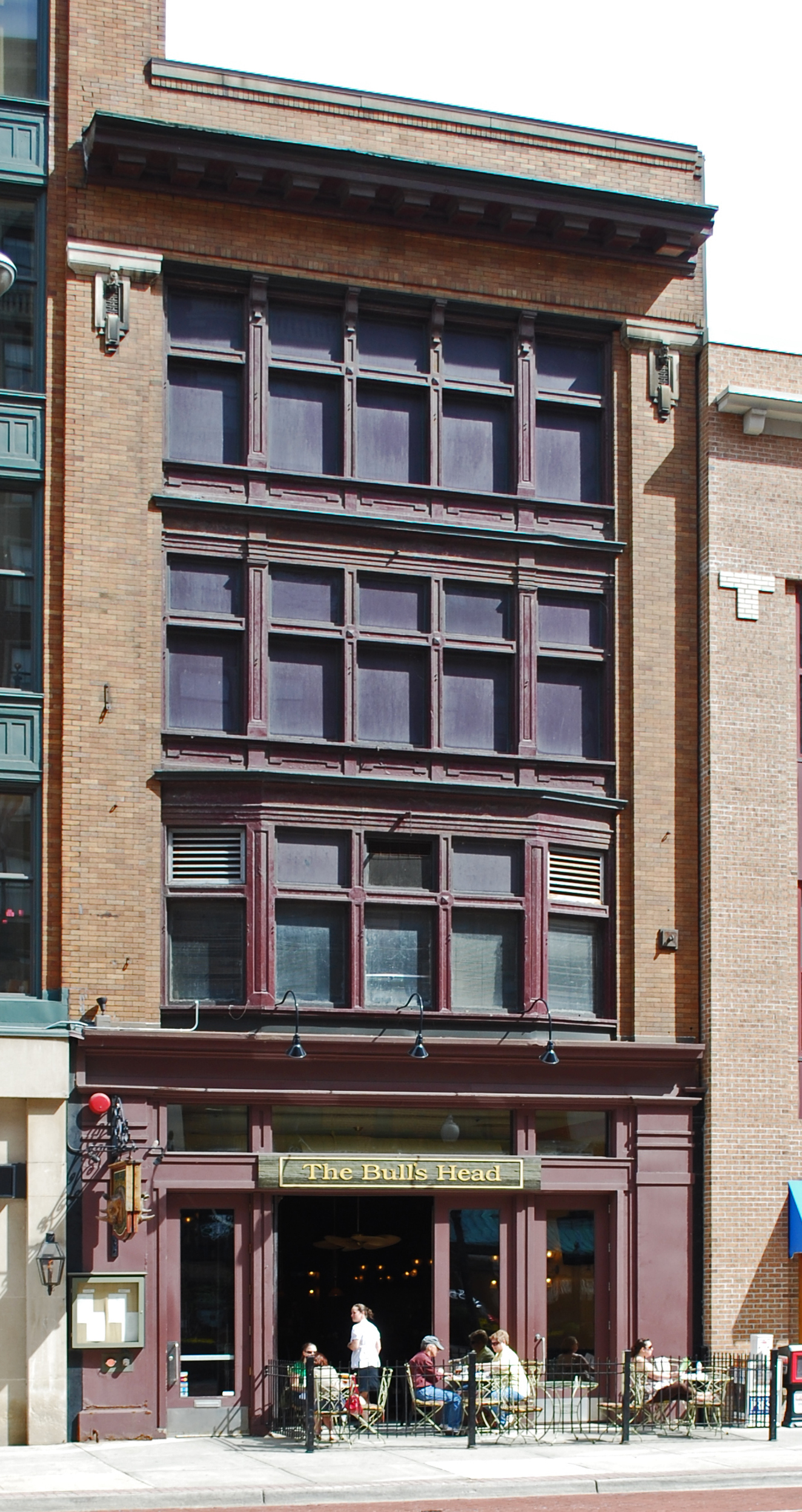

- Location within Michigan Location within the United States
- Interactive map
- Location: 188 Monroe St., NW, Grand Rapids, Michigan
- Coordinates: 42°58′00″N 85°40′19″W
- Area: less than one acre
- Built: c. 1895
- Architectural style: Chicago school
- NRHP reference No.: 80001877
- Added to NRHP: April 17, 1980

The Goodspeed Brothers Building is a commercial structure located at 188 Monroe Street NW in Grand Rapids, Michigan. It was listed on the National Register of Historic Places in 1980.

== History ==
John W. Goodspeed was born in 1859 and his younger brother Theron was born five years later in 1864. In the early 1890s, the two men moved from Ypsilanti, Michigan to Grand Rapids and opened a shoe store. The business thrived, and soon the brothers constructed their own building in the heart of the central business district. By the turn of the century, construction was complete and the brothers' shoe business was even better. However, in about 1907, the Goodspeed brothers decided to install a motion picture theatre in the upper story of the building, the first such establishment in the city. The new "Idle Hour Theatre" proved popular, and remained in business until 1928, when its small size began to affect its ability to compete with newer, larger theatres. After the theatre closed, the building was occupied by Marshall's, Inc., a women's wear shop, the by Renard's Shoes, and later by the Eugene Hotel. In about 1980, the building was renovated to hold a restaurant.

== Description ==
The Goodspeed Brothers Building is a five bay, four story steel-framed Chicago school structure covered with brown brick. On the front facade, the first floor storefront is non-original. The floors above the ground level are largely original, and each contains a band of five windows framed by decorative metal uprights and spandrels. The second floor windows project slightly, creating a low relief bay. Two large brick piers run on each side of the building from the ceiling level of the first floor to the corniceline. At the top, a simple cornice and plain brick parapet cap the building.
