= First Leiter Building =

Former historic building in Chicago, IL, United States

- Leiter I Building
- Formerly listed on the U.S. National Register of Historic Places
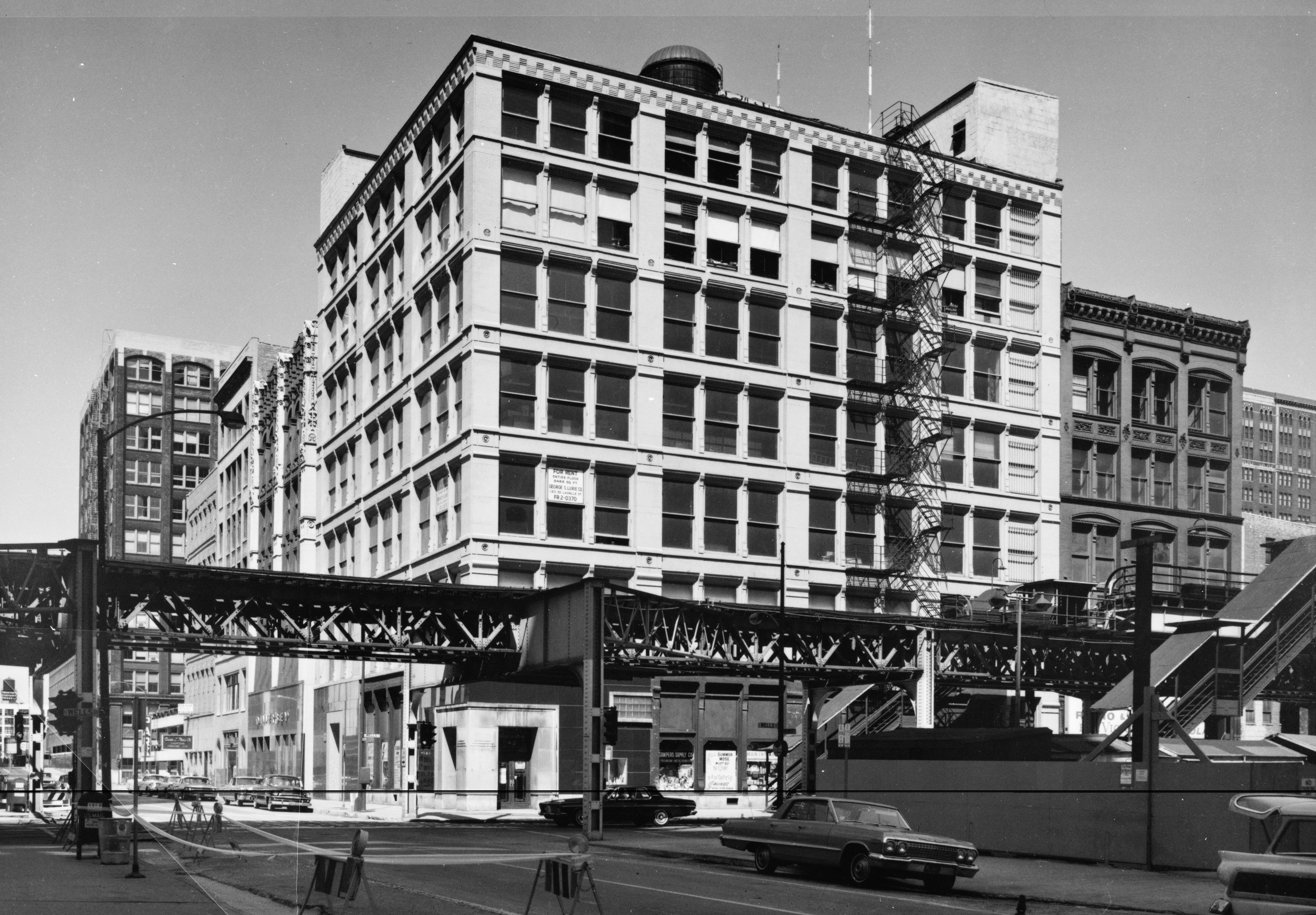
- Coordinates: 41°52′51.6″N 87°38′3.4″W
- Built: 1879
- Demolished: 1972
- NRHP reference No.: 70000910

Significant dates
- Added to NRHP: Unknown
- Removed from NRHP: 1972

The First Leiter building (or Leiter I) was a Chicago commercial structure built in 1879 by William Le Baron Jenney. It was renovated and extended in 1888, and demolished in 1972.

Jenney designed this building, located at Washington and Wells Streets, as a department store for Levi Z. Leiter. This building marked a significant milestone in architectural engineering: it combined, for the first time, four essential elements of a modern skyscraper in one building. These were: its great height (Leiter I was originally five stories tall, and shortly after expanded to seven stories); an iron skeletal frame; terra cotta fireproofing materials on all of its structural members; and, vertical transportation via elevators. It also utilized a new type of glass in its windows. Although the city building department required Jenney to build one exterior party wall as a traditional masonry loadbearing structure and the floors were of heavy timber construction, the rest of the building was a truly modern innovation.

Lewis Mumford writes that "iron cage and curtain wall" construction, which was first proposed in the 1840s by James Bogardus, and which "translated into colossal paleotechnic forms the vernacular frame and clapboard construction of the old American farmhouse" was realized first in the Home Insurance Building, and then more completely in the Leiter Building.

== See also ==
- Chicago architecture
- Second Leiter Building
