= Brooks Building =

Office skyscraper in Chicago, Illinois

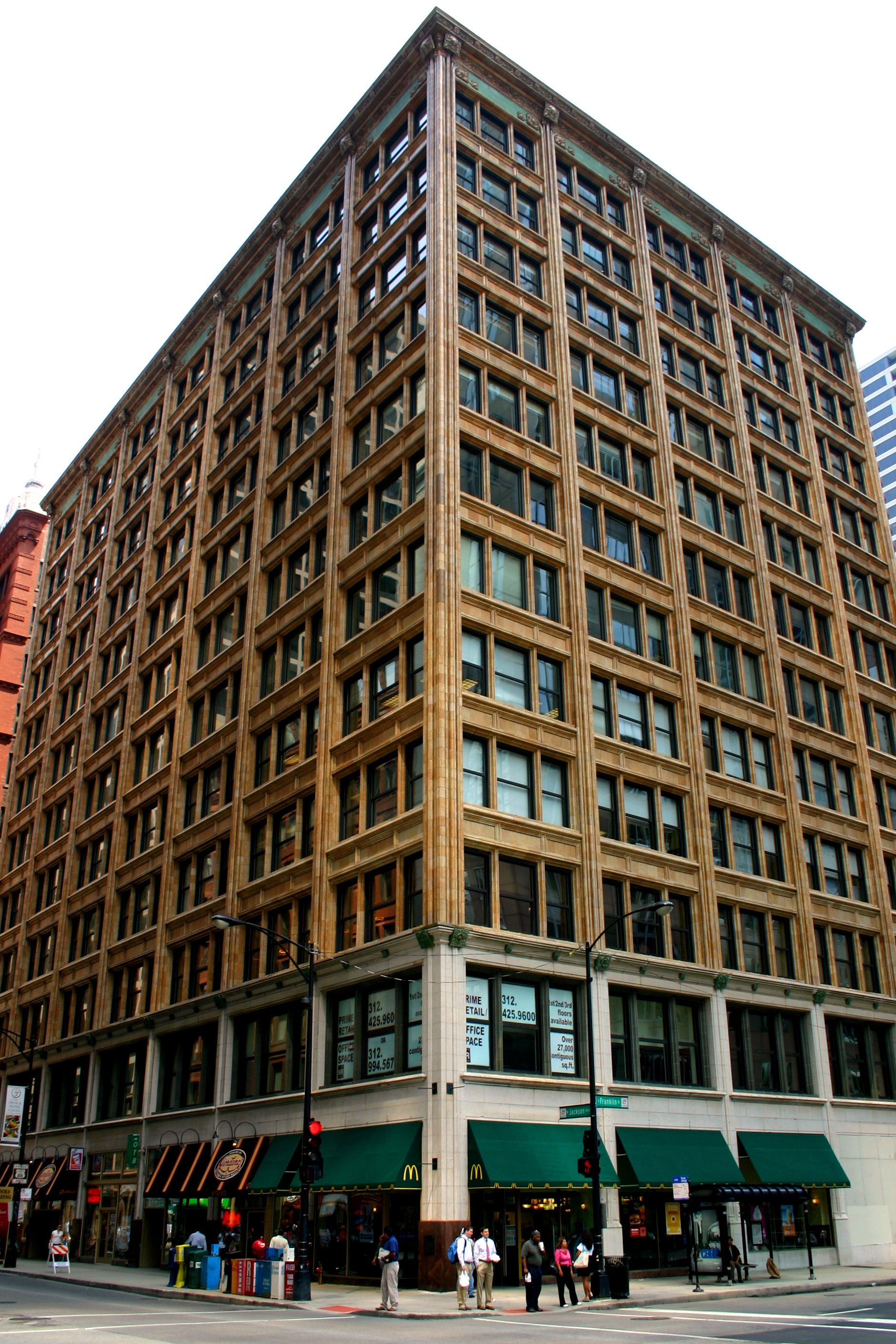
- Brooks Building viewed from the northwest
- Interactive map of the Brooks Building area

General information
- Type: Office
- Architectural style: Chicago School
- Location: 223 West Jackson Boulevard; Chicago, Illinois 60606 U.S.
- Coordinates: 41°52′40″N 87°38′05″W
- Elevation: 590 ft (180 m)
- Construction started: 1909
- Completed: 1910

Height
- Height: c. 139.09 ft (42.39 m)

Technical details
- Floor count: 12
- Floor area: 13,174 sq ft (1,223.9 m^{2})
- Lifts/elevators: 4

Design and construction
- Architects: William Holabird, Martin Roche
- Architecture firm: Holabird & Roche

Chicago Landmark
- Designated: January 14, 1997

The Brooks Building is a high-rise building in Chicago's commercial core, the Loop. It was built 1909–1910, in the Chicago School architectural style. An early example steel-framed high-rise building, the structure was commissioned by Peter Brooks and Shepard Brooks and designed by architects Holabird & Roche. The building was designated a Chicago Landmark on January 14, 1997. It was also determined eligible for listing in the National Register of Historic Places (NRHP) on October 8, 1982; however, it is not formally included in the NRHP due to the wishes of the property's owner.

== See also ==
- Architecture of Chicago
- List of Chicago Landmarks
