= 19 South LaSalle Street =

Skyscraper in Chicago, Illinois

Coordinates: 41°52′53″N 87°37′55″W

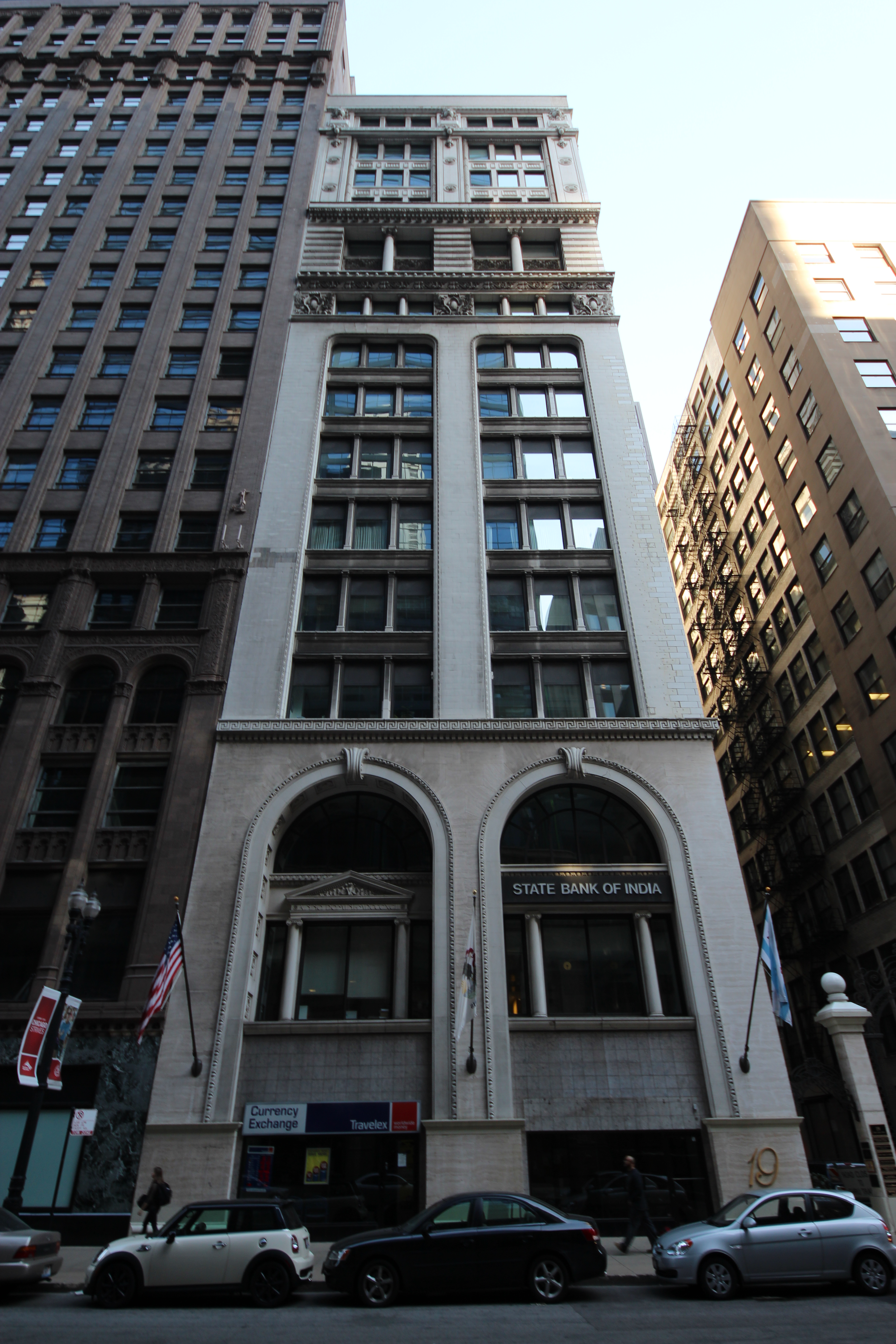

- Location within Chicago metropolitan area Location within Illinois Location within the United States
- Former names: Central YMCA Association Building

General information
- Type: Mixed-use
- Location: Chicago, Illinois, 19 S. LaSalle St.
- Current tenants: Vivid Ascent, et al.
- Completed: 1893
- Owner: Cloverfield, Inc.

Height
- Height: 16 stories

Design and construction
- Architecture firm: Jenney & Mundie

Website
- www.colmgmt.com/

19 South LaSalle Street, formerly known as the Central YMCA Association Building, is a building in downtown Chicago, Illinois. It was constructed in 1893 and designed by the architecture firm Jenney & Mundie.

== History ==
19 South LaSalle Street was constructed as the Central YMCA Association Building in 1893, and completed shortly before the Panic of 1893. It also housed the Central YMCA College starting in 1961./ The structure, designed by William LeBaron Jenney and William Bryce Mundie as Jenney & Mundie, was eventually renamed for its address, 19 South LaSalle Street. Modern-day 19 South LaSalle Street is owned by Cloverfield, Inc. and operated by Colonnade Management, Inc. as a mixed-use retail and office building. Law offices and companies such as Vivid Ascent, an integrated marketing firm, and Sprint, which has a retail location in the building, operate out of 19 South LaSalle Street.

== Architecture ==
19 South LaSalle Street has been described as one of Jenney's most "uncompromising" facades due to its rectangularity which is only interrupted by horizontal banding at the 11th and 12th stories. Although, the horizontal courses and the building's shifting design are typical of Jenney's work around this time period. 19 South LaSalle is designed in an "L" shape with its more narrow 54 foot facade facing toward LaSalle Street while a longer, more elaborate 187 foot facade faces a small alley known as Arcade Place. The building stands 16 stories and was originally topped with a peaked roof which was replaced by an additional three stories. 19 South LaSalle Street was mentioned in the 2004 American Institute of Architects Guide to Chicago.
