= Ahorn, Baden-Württemberg =

Ahorn
- Municipality
- Coat of arms

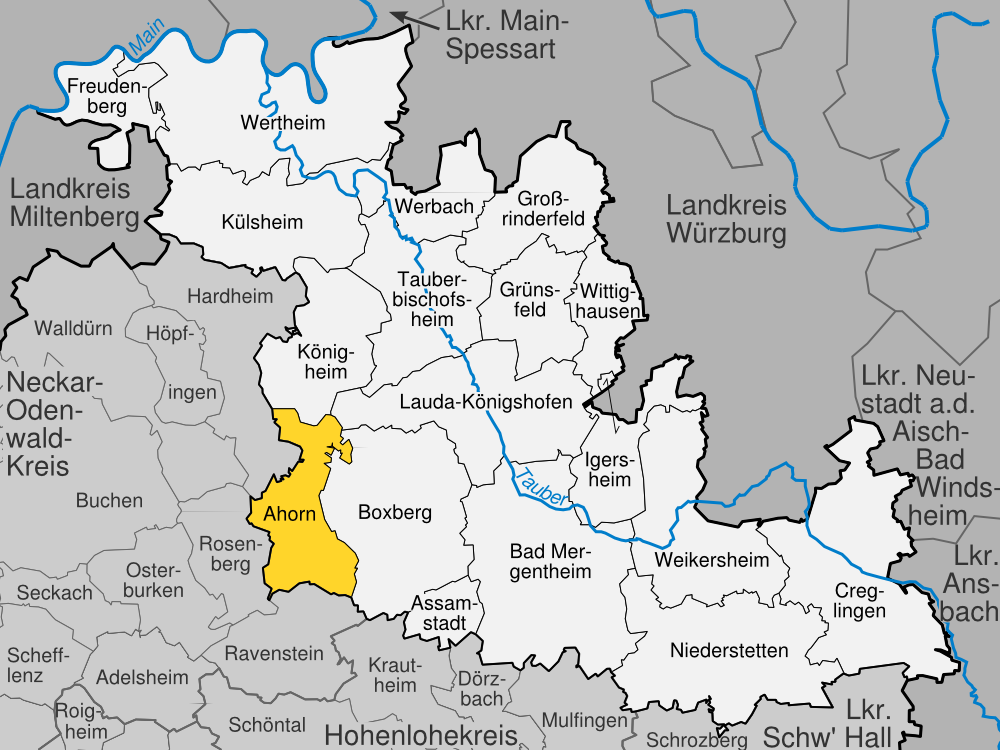
- Location of Ahorn within Main-Tauber-Kreis district
- Interactive map of Ahorn
- Location within Germany Location within Baden-Württemberg
- Coordinates: 49°30′03″N 09°32′23″E
- Country: Germany
- State: Baden-Württemberg
- Admin. region: Stuttgart
- District: Main-Tauber-Kreis

Government
  - Mayor (2021–29): Benjamin Czernin (Ind.)

Area
  - Total: 53.96 km^{2} (20.83 sq mi)
- Elevation: 360 m (1,180 ft)

Population (2025-12-31)
  - Total: 2,217
  - Density: 41.09/km^{2} (106.4/sq mi)
- Time zone: UTC+01:00 (CET)
  - Summer (DST): UTC+02:00 (CEST)
- Postal codes: 74744
- Dialling codes: 06296, 07930, 09340
- Vehicle registration: TBB, MGH
- Website: www.gemeindeahorn.de

Ahorn (German pronunciation: [ˈaːhɔʁn]) is a municipality in the district of Main-Tauber in Baden-Württemberg in Germany. It consists of the villages Berolzheim, Buch, Eubigheim, Hohenstadt, and Schillingstadt.
