= Home Insurance Building =

Office building in Chicago, Illinois

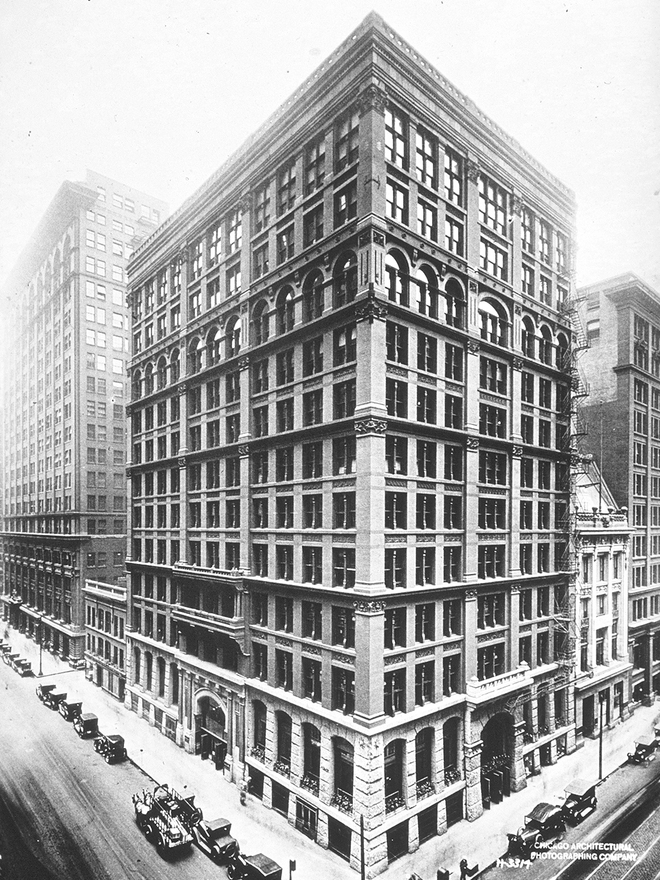
- Photograph of Home Insurance Building circa 1920s after the addition of two additional floors to the original building

General information
- Type: Office
- Location: Chicago, Illinois, United States
- Coordinates: 41.8796°N 87.6320°W
- Construction started: 1884
- Completed: 1885
- Demolished: 1931

Height
- Roof: Originally 138 feet (42.1 meters)
- Top floor: After addition of the final two floors – 180 feet (55 meters)

Technical details
- Floor count: 10 (later 12)

Design and construction
- Architect: William Le Baron Jenney

The Home Insurance Building was an early skyscraper that stood in Chicago, Illinois, United States, from 1885 to its demolition in 1931. Originally ten stories and 138 ft (42.1 m) tall, it was designed by William Le Baron Jenney in 1884 and completed the next year. Two floors were added in 1891, bringing its height to 180 feet (54.9 meters). Often cited as the world's first skyscraper, it was the first tall building to be supported both inside and outside by a fireproof structural steel frame, including reinforced concrete.

== History ==
The building, located at the northeast corner of LaSalle and Adams streets, was designed in 1884 by Jenney for the Home Insurance Company. Construction began on May 1, 1884.

Because of the building's unique architecture and weight-bearing frame, it is often cited as the world's first skyscraper. It had 10 stories and rose to a height of 138 ft (42.1 m); two additional floors were added in 1891, bringing the total to 12 floors, an unprecedented height at the time.

The building weighed one-third as much as a masonry building and city officials were so concerned they halted construction while they investigated its safety.

=== Demolition and replacement ===
In April 1929, the building was reported as having a 90 percent occupancy rate, compared to an occupancy rate of the surrounding financial district estimated at 96 percent or more. In September 1929, plans were made by Marshall Field's to construct a large office building spanning Adams, Clark, and LaSalle Streets. This building would be constructed and opened in parts, the first part occupying the western part of the lot and the site of the Home Insurance Building.

At least six buildings were demolished to make way for the Field Building, including the Home Insurance Building. In 1932, owners placed a plaque in the southwest section of the lobby reading:

This section of the Field Building is erected on the site of the Home Insurance Building, which structure, designed and built in eighteen hundred and eighty four by the late William Le Baron Jenney, was the first high building to utilize as the basic principle of its design the method known as skeleton construction and, being a primal influence in the acceptance of this principle, was the true father of the skyscraper, 1932.

== Status as first skyscraper ==
The Home Insurance Building in Chicago is often considered the world's first skyscraper due to both its design and height; the building was supported using an iron frame skeleton. It was one of the earliest buildings to use an iron frame skeleton and the tallest to ever do so at the time, rising to ten stories; with an additional two stories added. It was the first multistory building in the United States to largely use iron to support the masonry since Badger had constructed similar grain elevators between 1860 and 1862. The status of the Home Insurance Building as the first skyscraper had been accorded by the time of its centennial in 1985.

The Chicago press at the time of its construction did not refer to it as the first skyscraper in Chicago. An 1884 list of buildings considered skyscrapers in Chicago listed three buildings in the city whose final heights would be taller than the Home Insurance Building's, although the Home Insurance Building was completed in 1885, a year after the list. Iron framing of multistory buildings had originated in England in the late 18th century and was able to replace exterior load-bearing walls by 1844, but social movements and legal regulations hindered their use at that time.

An example is the Ditherington Flax Mill in England, built in 1797, but it was only five stories tall. The Broad Street Station in Philadelphia, Pennsylvania, a six-story building designed by Wilson Brothers & Company built in 1881, had a structural steel frame and was one of the first buildings in America to use masonry not as structure, but as curtain wall. But at only six stories, it was not considered the world's first skyscraper. Chicago and New York City each had some lower height structures using iron framing, but they were not fireproof. Later buildings in Chicago were able to solve these problems by supporting the external masonry entirely on the iron frame, which later became the standard worldwide. Peter B. Wright had constructed such a column in Chicago in 1874. Leroy Buffington of Minneapolis, Minnesota, developed a system of using wrought iron to frame buildings. However, the design of the Home Insurance Building, supporting the external masonry entirely on the iron frame, was used more by architects worldwide. Buffington later patented his wrought iron to frame design in 1888, but the Chicago school of architecture had already begun. Other tall structures completed before the external masonry to iron frame style included the 1882 Montauk Building, also in Chicago, and the 1870 Equitable Life Building in New York City. There were also a few other buildings in New York and Chicago of similar height with different architectural designs.

== See also ==
- Chicago architecture

== Other references ==
- 1885 First Skyscraper, Chicago Public Library ("Chicago: 1885 First Skyscraper". Archived from the original on February 12, 2008.)
- Theodore Turak, William Le Baron Jenney: A Pioneer in Modern Architecture, Ann Arbor, Michigan: UMI Research Press, 1986
- Carl Condit, The Chicago School of Architecture, The University of Chicago Press, Chicago, Illinois and London, England, 1964.
