= Second Leiter Building =

- U.S. National Register of Historic Places
- U.S. National Historic Landmark
- Chicago Landmark
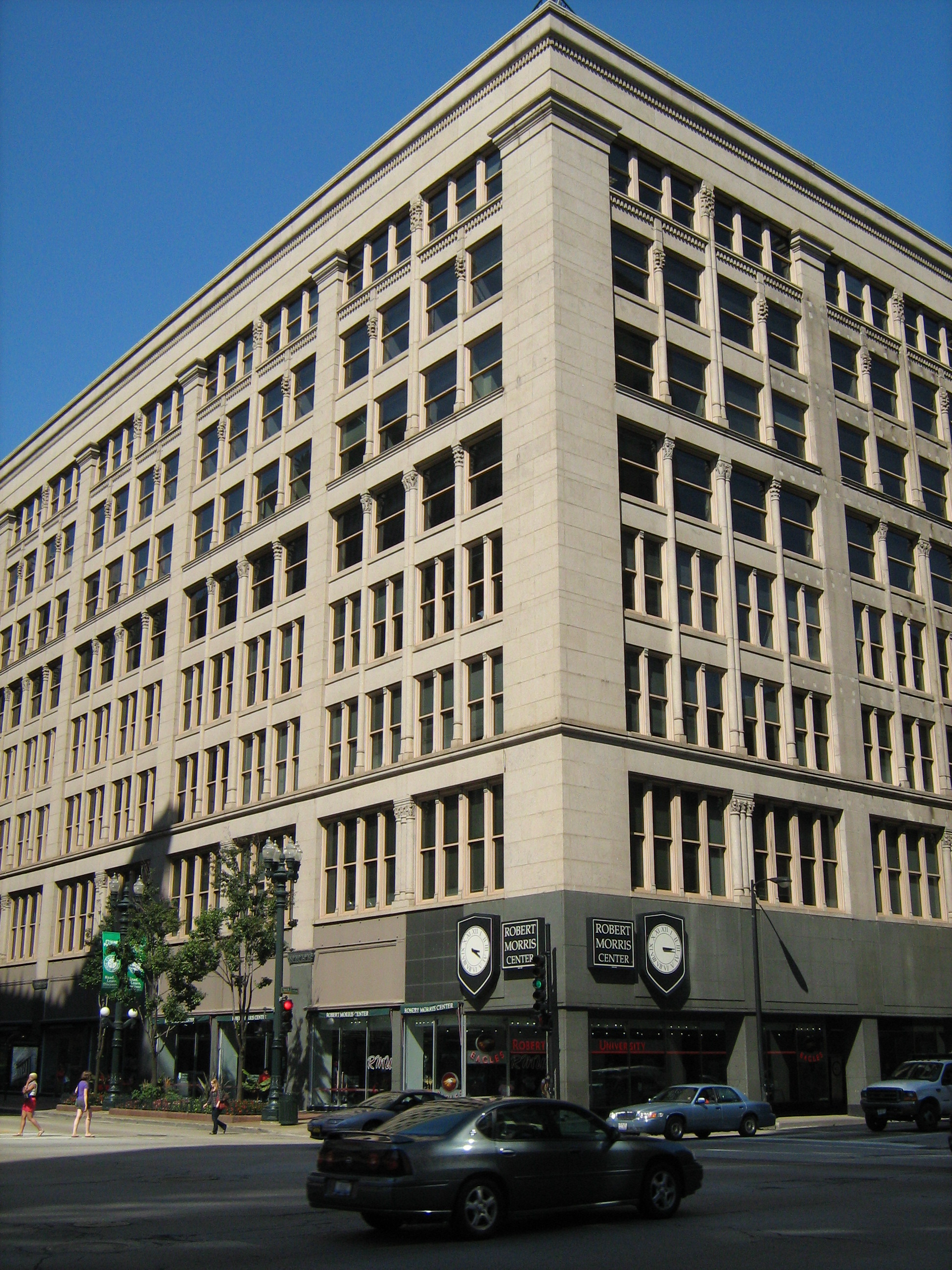
- (2009)
- Location: Chicago, Illinois
- Coordinates: 41°52′35.04″N 87°37′38.56″W
- Built: 1891
- Architect: William Le Baron Jenney
- NRHP reference No.: 76000695

Significant dates
- Added to NRHP: January 7, 1976
- Designated NHL: January 7, 1976
- Designated CHICL: January 14, 1997

The Second Leiter Building, also known as the Leiter II Building, the Sears Building, One Congress Center, and Robert Morris Center, is located at the northeast corner of South State Street and East Ida B. Wells Drive in Chicago, Illinois. The building is not to be confused with the present Willis Tower, formerly the Sears Tower, constructed and owned by the famous nationwide mail-order firm Sears, Roebuck & Company. This landmark of the Chicago school of architecture gained fame for being one of the earliest commercial buildings constructed with a metal skeleton frame remaining in the United States.

Built in 1891 by Levi Z. Leiter, (1834–1904), the Second Leiter Building was designed by architect William Le Baron Jenney, who implemented the skeletal frame made of steel to make the design fireproof. The building was leased by Levi Leiter to the department store of Siegel, Cooper and Company who occupied it for approximately seven years. After Siegel Cooper closed, the building hosted various tenants until it became the downtown flagship store of Sears, Roebuck and Company in 1931. Sears occupied the space the until 1986 when it decided to close the store and the space was leased to other tenants.

The structure is eight floors and occupies the entire block of State Street between Ida B. Wells Drive and Van Buren Street. The State Street facade consists of nine bays separated by wide pilasters. The pilasters are capped by simple capitals and an unadorned cornice crowns the entire structure. The Ida B. Wells and Van Buren facades are three bays wide with measurements of 400 ft (120 m) by 143 ft (44 m). Within each bay are four windows on each floor aligned vertically. The building is faced with a pink granite. Each floor contains 50,000 sq ft (4,600 m^{2}) with 16 ft (4.9 m) ceilings and could be divided to house multiple tenants.

Its predecessor, the First Leiter Building, was designed by Jenney in 1879 and stood at Wells and Monroe until it was demolished in 1972. The Second Leiter Building was designated a National Historic Landmark in 1976, and a Chicago Landmark on January 14, 1997. From 1998 to 2020, the building was home to the Chicago campus of Robert Morris University, which vacated the space following its merger with Roosevelt University on March 9, 2020. Ownership of the property was subsequently reverted to the lender of the $47.8 million in outstanding debt.

A venture of Marc Calabria paid $4.2 million for the vacated building in October 2025. Plans for the property were not disclosed at the time of transaction, although sources speculate Calabria could undertake a residential conversion similar to its existing venture with Primera Group for the 41-story Clark Adams Building.

== See also ==
- Architecture of Chicago
- List of National Historic Landmarks in Illinois
