= William Le Baron Jenney =

American architect and engineer (1832–1907)

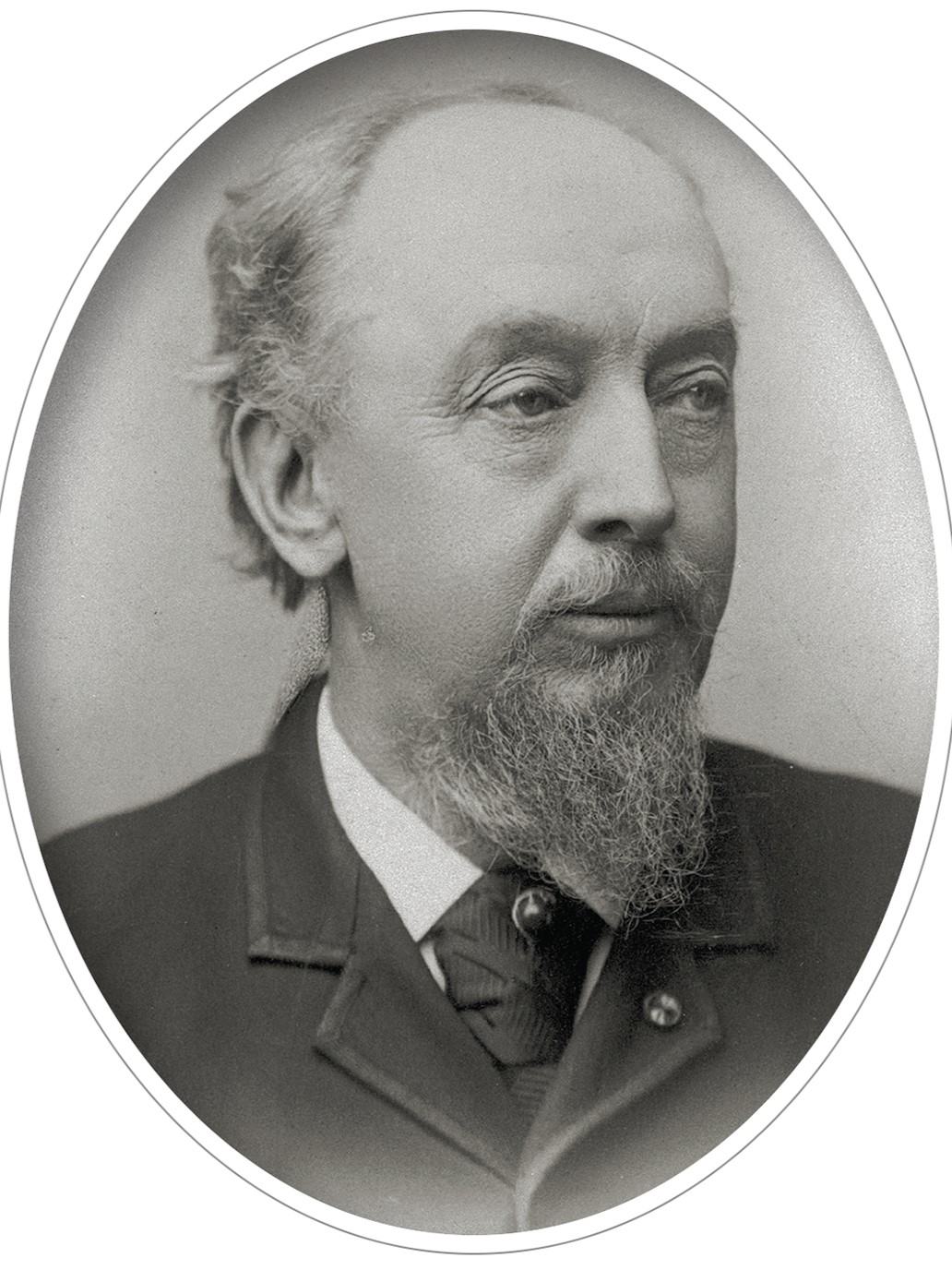
- Born: September 25, 1832; Fairhaven, Massachusetts, U.S.
- Died: June 15, 1907 (aged 74); Los Angeles, California, U.S.
- Education: École Centrale Paris
- Occupation: Architect
- Awards: American Institute of Architects Fellow (1885)
- Buildings: Home Insurance Building in Chicago
- Design: metal-framed skyscraper

Signature
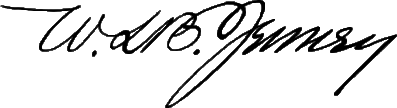

William Le Baron Jenney (September 25, 1832 – June 14, 1907) was an American architect and engineer known for building the first skyscraper in 1884.

In 1998, Jenney was ranked number 89 in the book 1,000 Years, 1,000 People: Ranking the Men and Women Who Shaped the Millennium.

== Life and career ==
Jenney was born in Fairhaven, Massachusetts, on September 25, 1832, the son of William Proctor Jenney and Eliza LeBaron Gibbs. Jenney began his formal education at Phillips Academy, Andover, in 1846, and at the Lawrence Scientific school at Harvard University in 1853, but transferred to the École Centrale des Arts et Manufactures (École Centrale Paris, France) to study engineering and architecture.^{[1]} In Paris he discovered the writings of Viollet-le-Duc and he will become one of his followers: "the research and discoveries of Viollet le Duc surpass anything that any other author has been able to write".

At École Centrale Paris, he learned the latest iron construction techniques as well as the classical functionalist doctrine of Jean-Nicolas-Louis Durand (1760–1834) – Professor of Architecture at the Ecole Polytechnique. He graduated in 1856, one year after his classmate, Gustave Eiffel, the designer of the Eiffel Tower.^{[7]}

In 1861, he returned to the US to join the Union Army as an engineer in the American Civil War, designing fortifications for Generals Sherman and Grant.

By the end of the war, he had become a major, and was Engineer-in-Charge at Nashville's Union headquarters.^{[1]} After the war, in 1867, Jenney moved to Chicago, Illinois and began his own architectural office, which specialized in commercial buildings and urban planning.

During the late 1870s, he commuted weekly to Ann Arbor, Michigan, to start and teach in the architecture program at the University of Michigan. In later years, future leaders of the Chicago School like Louis Sullivan, Daniel Burnham, William Holabird, and Martin Roche, performed their architectural apprenticeships on Jenney's staff.^{[1]} In 1884, budding architect D. Everett Waid joined Jenney's firm Jenney & Mundie in Chicago as a draftsman and remained there until 1894.

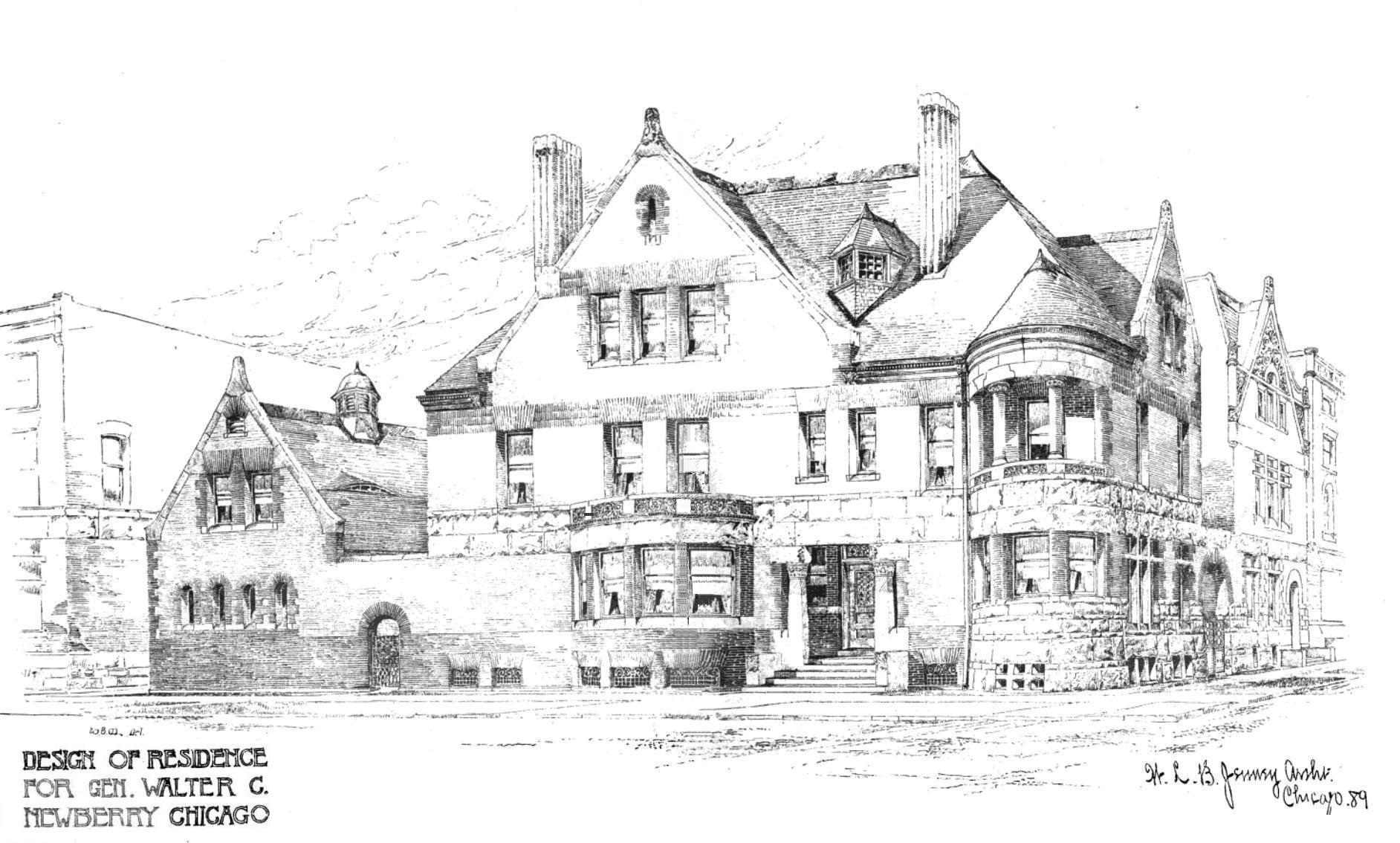
Chicago residence designed for Walter Cass Newberry, 1889

On May 8, 1867, Jenney and Elizabeth "Lizzie" Hannah Cobb, from Cleveland, Ohio, were married.^{[7]} They had two children named Max and Francis.^{[7]}

Jenney was elected an Associate of the American Institute of Architects in 1872 and became a Fellow in 1885. He served as first Vice President from 1898 to 1899.^{[4]} In Chicago, he designed the Ludington Building and Manhattan Building, both built in 1891 and National Historic Landmarks. He also designed the Horticultural Building for the World's Columbian Exposition (1893) held in Chicago.

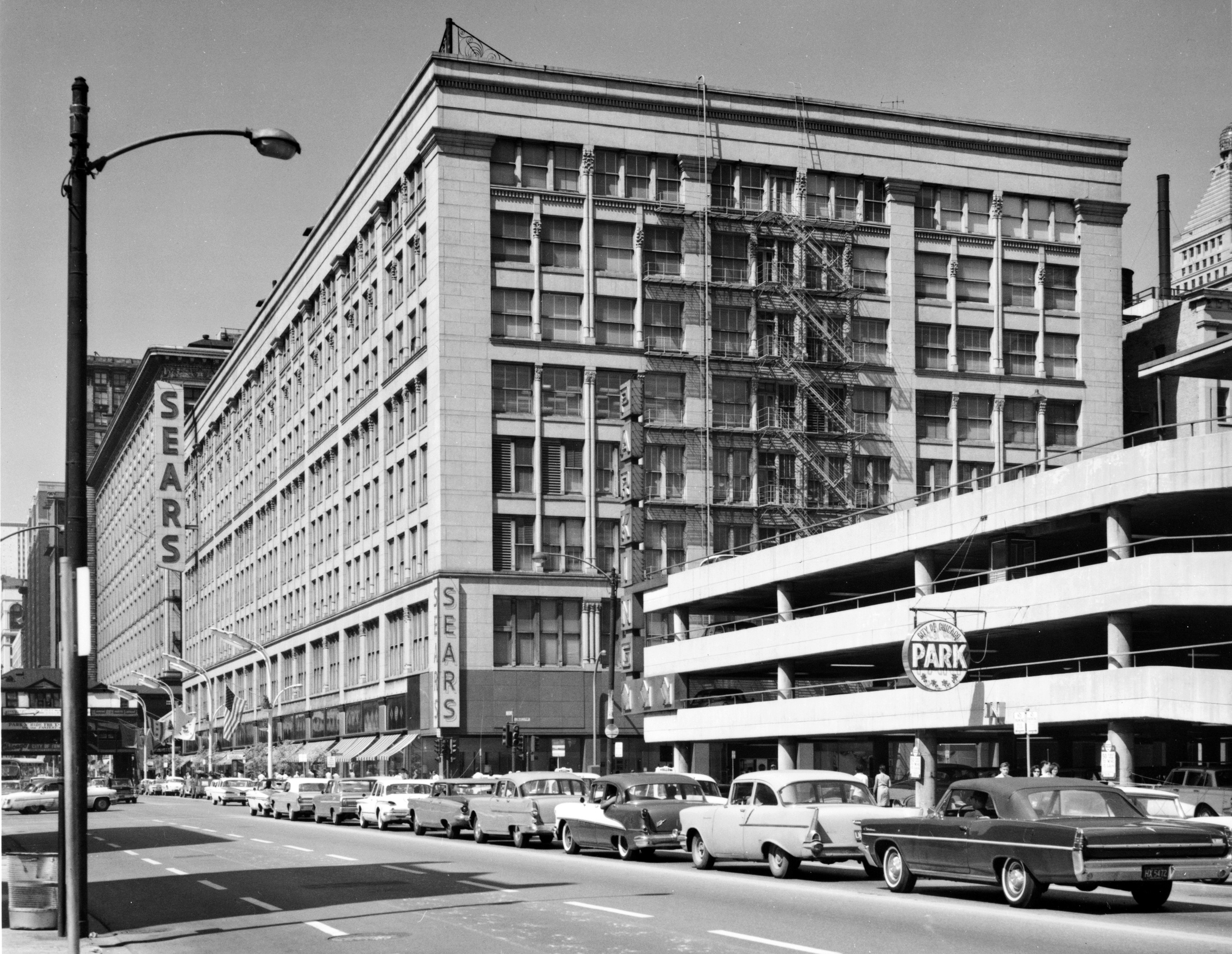
Leiter II Building, South State & East Congress Streets, Chicago, Illinois as seen in 1963 as a Sears & Roebuck department store (built 1889–1891)

== Advent of the steel-frame skyscraper ==
Jenney is best known for designing the ten-story Home Insurance Building in Chicago. The building was the first fully metal-framed building and is considered the first skyscraper. It was built from 1884 to 1885, enlarged by adding two stories in 1891, and demolished in 1931.^{[3]} In his designs, he used metal columns and beams instead of stone and brick to support the building's upper levels.

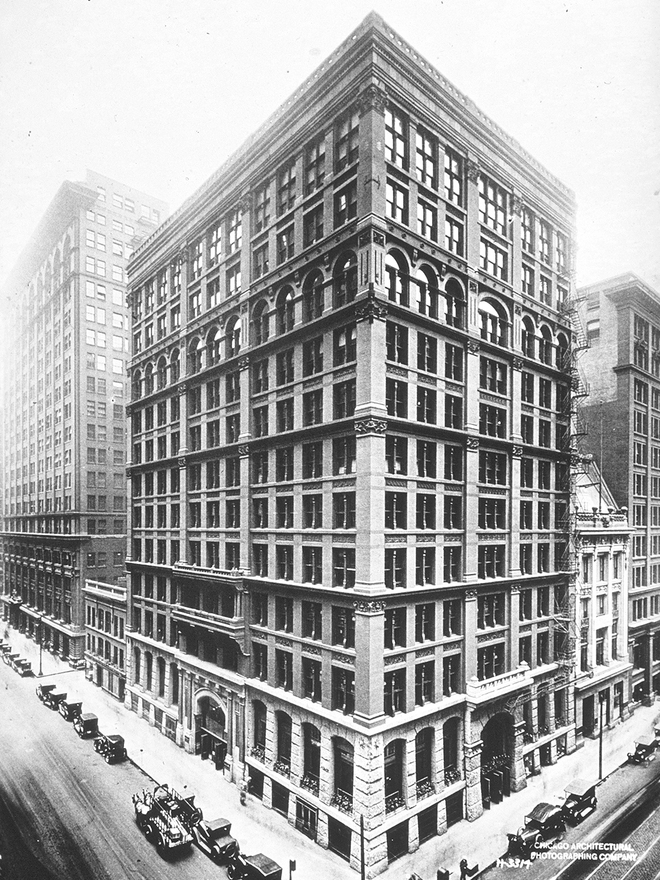
The Home Insurance Building in Chicago built in 1885 (photo after a 1891 addition of 2 more floors) demolished in 1931

The steel needed to support the Home Insurance Building weighed only one-third as much as a ten-story building made of heavy masonry.^{[3]} Using this method, the weight of the building was reduced, thus allowing the possibility to construct even taller structures. Later, he solved the problem of fireproof construction for tall buildings by using masonry, iron, and terra cotta flooring and partitions. From 1889 to 1891, he displayed his system in the construction of the Second Leiter Building, also in Chicago.

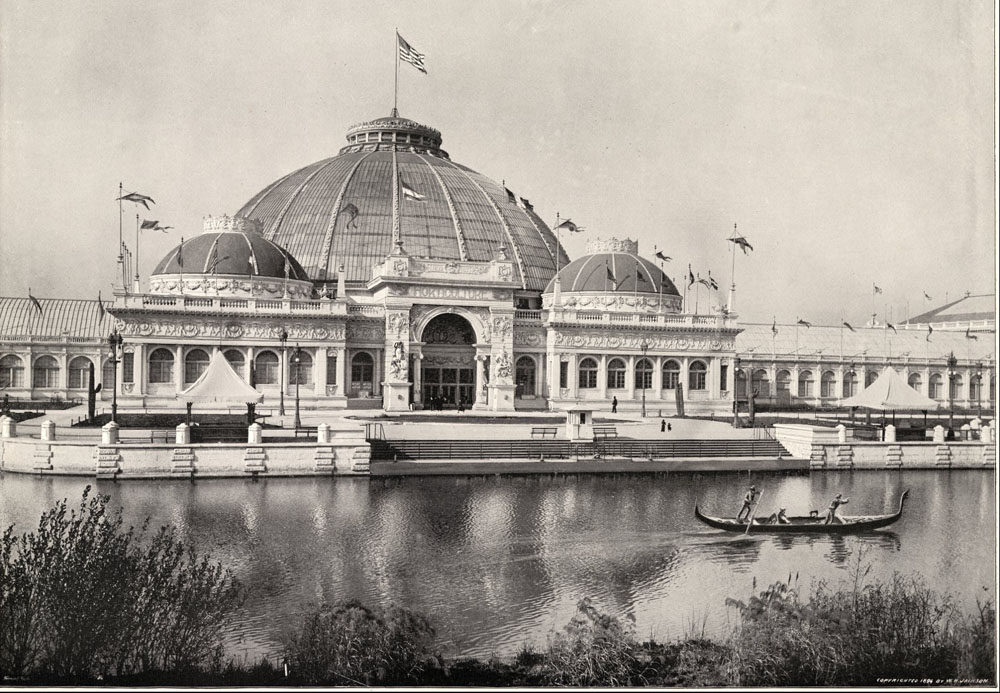
Horticultural Building at World's Columbian Exposition

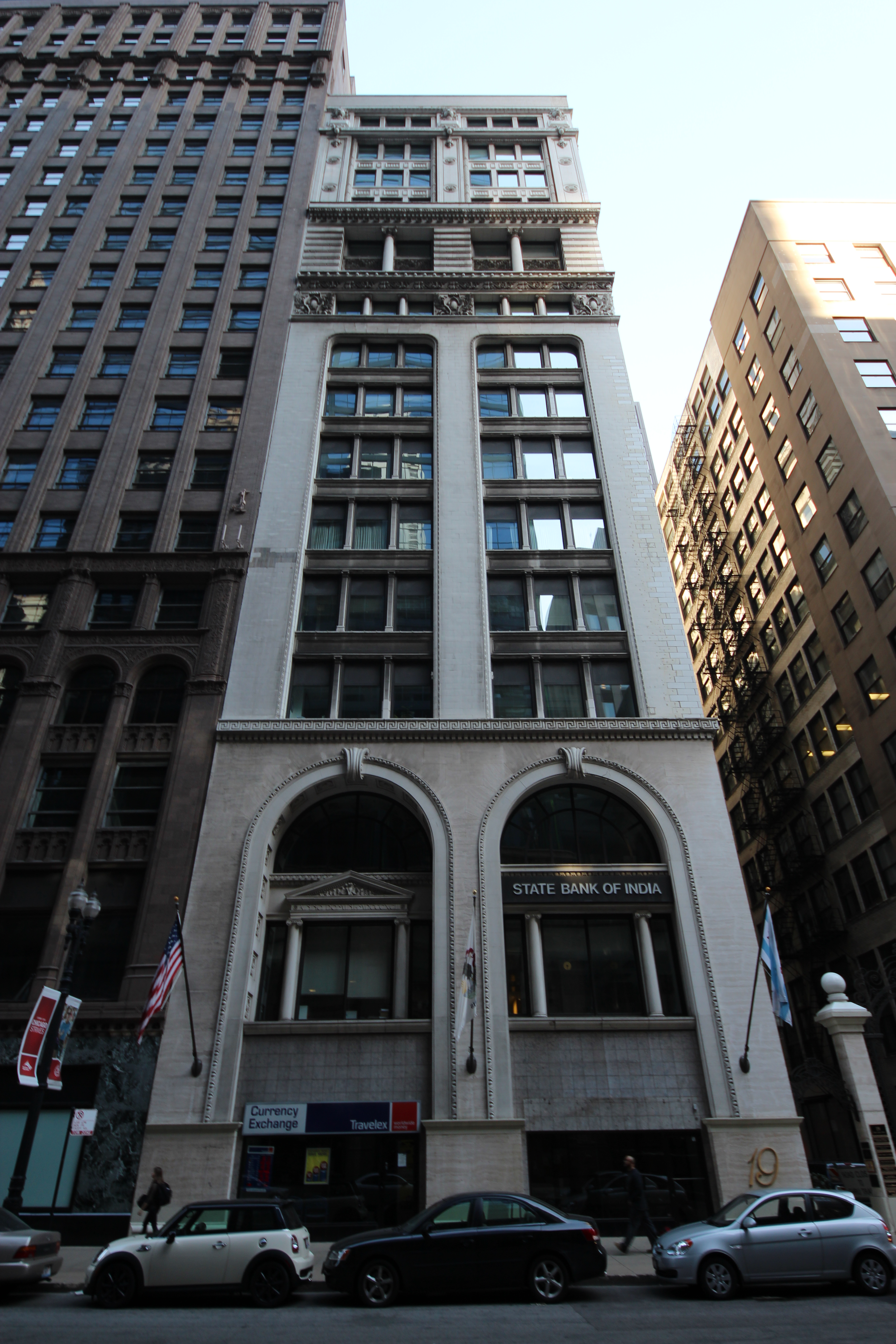
19 South LaSalle, Chicago, Illinois as seen in 2012 (built 1893)

According to a popular story, one day he came home early and surprised his wife who was reading. She put her book down on top of a birdcage and ran to meet him. He strode across the room, lifted the book, and dropped it back on the bird cage two or three times. Then, he exclaimed: "It works! It works! Don’t you see? If this little cage can hold this heavy book, why can’t an iron or steel cage be the framework for a whole building?" Jenney applied his new idea to the construction of the Home Insurance Building, the first skyscraper in the world, erected in 1884 at the corner of LaSalle and Monroe Streets in Chicago. Another source cites the inspiration for the steel skyscraper as coming from vernacular, Philippine architecture, where wooden framed construction gave Jenney the idea. The Home Insurance Building was the first example of a steel skeleton building, the first grid of iron columns, girders, beams, and floor joists ever constructed.

== Legacy ==
He died in Los Angeles, California, on June 15, 1907. After Jenney's death, his ashes were scattered over his wife's grave, just south of the Eternal Silence section of Uptown's Graceland Cemetery.^{[5]} In 1998, Jenney was ranked number 89 in the book 1,000 Years, 1,000 People: Ranking the Men and Women Who Shaped the Millennium.^{[7]}

Original notes and papers of Jenney, including "Jenney's 1884 holograph notebook containing, among other things, structural calculations for the Home Insurance Building, and his undated sketch entitled 'Key to the sky scraper.'", are held by the Art Institute of Chicago.

== Projects ==
- Colonel James H. Bowen House, Hyde Park, Chicago, built in 1869
- L.Y. Schermerhorn Residence, 124 Scottswood Road, Riverside, Illinois, built in 1869
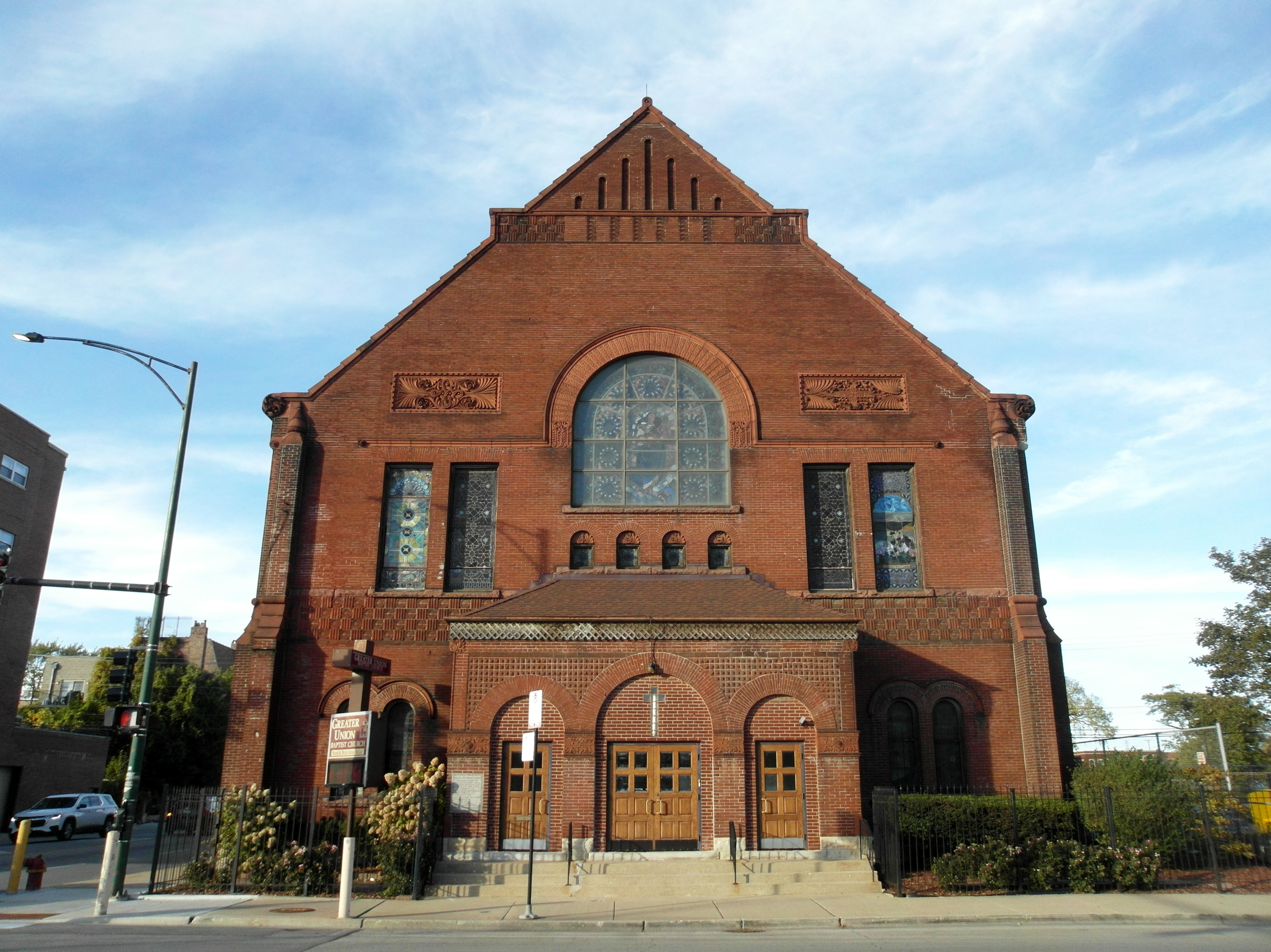
- Former Church of the Redeemer, now a Baptist church in Chicago, Illinois (built 1886)
  Metropolitan Block, 770 Main Street, Lake Geneva, Wisconsin, built in 1874, NRHP-listed
- Ingall's Block, SW corner of Pennsylvania and Washington, Indianapolis, 1875, commercial block once home to one of the first branches of Saks and Co. (now Saks Fifth Avenue)
- DKE Shant, Ann Arbor, Michigan, 1878
- Home Insurance Building, Chicago, built in 1884
- Church of the Redeemer, 1886, Chicago
- First Congregational Church (Manistee, Michigan), built in 1892 or 1888
- Second Leiter Building, Chicago, built in 1889
- Ludington Building, Chicago, built in 1891, National Historic Landmark
- Manhattan Building, Chicago, built in 1891, National Historic Landmark
- Horticultural Building, for the World's Columbian Exposition, Chicago, built in 1893
- 19 South LaSalle Street, 1893, downtown Chicago
- New York Life Insurance Building, Chicago, built in 1894
- Lake Forest Cemetery, Lake Forest, Illinois
- West Park District section of Chicago's boulevard system
- Part or all of Garfield Park, 100 North Central Park Avenue, Chicago, NRHP-listed
- Part or all of Humboldt Park, roughly bounded by North Sacramento and Augusta Blvds., and North Kedzie, North and North California Aves. and West Division Street, Chicago, NRHP-listed
- Railway Exchange Building, Milwaukee, 1901
- Illinois Memorial, Vicksburg National Military Park, 1906
