= George A. Fuller =

American architect

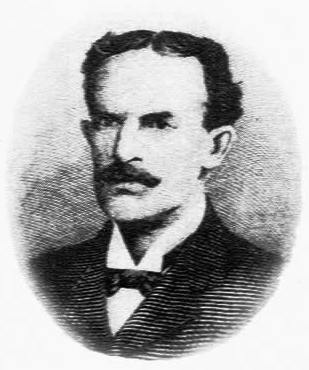
- Born: October 21, 1851; Templeton, Massachusetts, US
- Died: December 14, 1900 (aged 49); Chicago, Illinois, US
- Education: Andover College
- Occupation: Businessman
- Known for: The invention of the modern skyscraper
- Spouse: Ellen Mary Channing

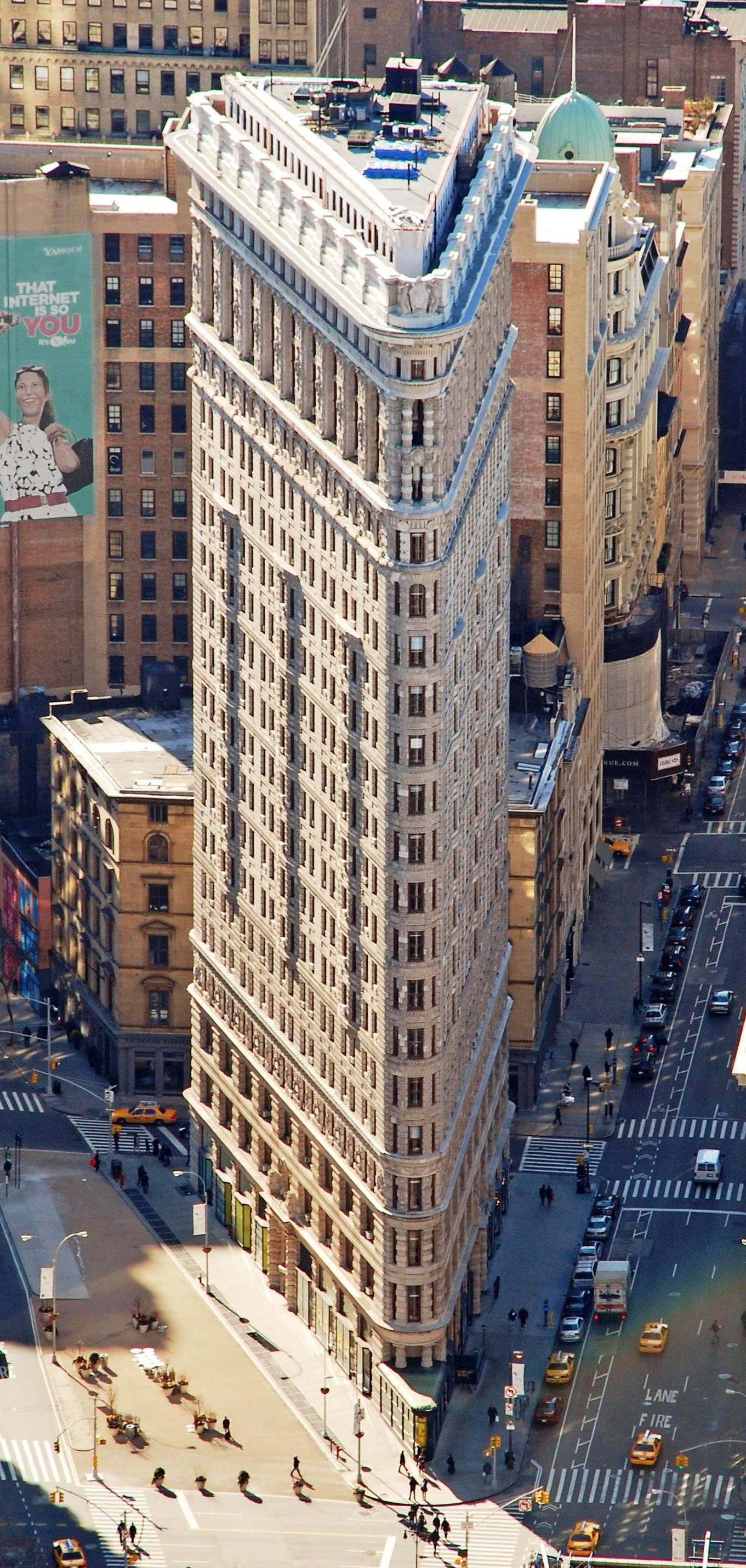
The Flatiron Building, seen here in 2010, was originally called the Fuller Building, named after George A. Fuller.

George A. Fuller (October 21, 1851 – December 14, 1900) was an American architect often credited as being the "inventor" of modern skyscrapers and the modern contracting system.

== Early life and career ==
George Fuller was born in Templeton, Massachusetts, near Worcester. After graduating from Andover College, he took a course in architecture at the newly founded MIT (known informally at the time as Boston Tech), and then started in the office of his uncle, J.E. Fuller, an architect in Worcester, Massachusetts. Fuller soon entered the office of Peabody & Stearns – a firm which specialized in building mansions for the rich in Newport, Rhode Island – where he soon developed a strong interest in the details of erecting a building, and was particularly interested in "skyscrapers", the name recently given to the tall buildings that had been made possible by Elisha Otis' invention of the safety elevator. At the age of twenty-five he was made a partner and placed in charge of Peabody & Stearns's New York office.

In New York, Fuller's design for a new club house for the Union League Club of New York, a Queen Anne mansion for the site at the corner of Fifth Avenue and 39th Street, won over eight other designs, including those submitted by noted architects Richard Morris Hunt and Charles McKim and William Rutherford Mead. Fuller also designed the United Bank Building, a nine-story building at Wall Street and Broadway, although he left Peabody & Stearns shortly after construction began, having spent four years there.

== George A. Fuller Company ==
Fuller moved to Chicago, the locus of much of the skyscraper construction in the United States at the time, where he formed a partnership with C. Everett Clark, another architect from Massachusetts, which lasted only two years. He then raised $50,000 and set up the George A. Fuller Company in 1882. Fuller's new firm was different from the many architecture firms of the time, in that it intended to handle all aspects of building construction except for the design of the building, which would come from outside architects. In this way, Fuller created the modern concept of the general contractor.

One of the new firm's first jobs was the Chicago Opera House, designed by Henry Ives Cobb and Charles S. Frost. In this building, Fuller, who was a proponent of using steel in building construction, utilized it for the floor beams, a decision which subjected him to criticism from the architectural community, which was wary of using steel and unsure of its long-term properties.

Very little is really known today of the properties of steel ... and though events point strongly to [it] becoming the metal of the future, there exists among many reasonable conservative men, a wide and well-grounded distrust of its use in the higher engineer or architectural structures, on account of its mysterious behavior, and frequent erratic and inexplicable failures.

Fuller's firm built the Tacoma Building in Chicago designed by Holabird & Roche and completed in 1889, which was the first skyscraper with non load bearing curtain walls. By using Bessemer steel beams, Fuller created steel cages that supported all the building's weight.

Fuller's firm also built the Rookery Building (1888, Burnham and Root), the Rand McNally Building (1890, Burnham & Root), the Pontiac Building (1891, Holabird & Roche) and the Monadnock Building (1891, Burnham & Root; 1893, Holabird & Roche) in Chicago, and the New York Times Building (1889, George B. Post) in New York City. The Fuller Company was also intensely involved in the building of the Chicago World's Fair of 1893, the Columbian Exposition, in which a temporary "White City on the Lake" was constructed under the supervision of Daniel Burnham.

With the success of his firm, Fuller became a multimillionaire, and his wife and daughters entered Chicago society. He commissioned Charles P. Post to design a home on Drexel Boulevard on the South Side of Chicago, and Post created a Queen Anne style mansion. His daughter, Allon, married Harry St. Francis Black in 1894, and Fuller took him into the company as vice president, despite the fact that Black was neither an architect nor an engineer.

In 1892, New York City altered its building regulations to allow skeleton construction and curtain walls, in which the load created by the building was carried by the internal skeleton and not by the exterior wall, a construction method which had been allowed under the Chicago building code for years. This change prompted Fuller to open an office in New York in 1896, and soon the company had contracts in Boston, Pittsburgh, St. Louis and Baltimore, as well as in Chicago and New York. Future skyscraper builder William A. Starrett joined the company in 1897 as an office boy.

== Death ==
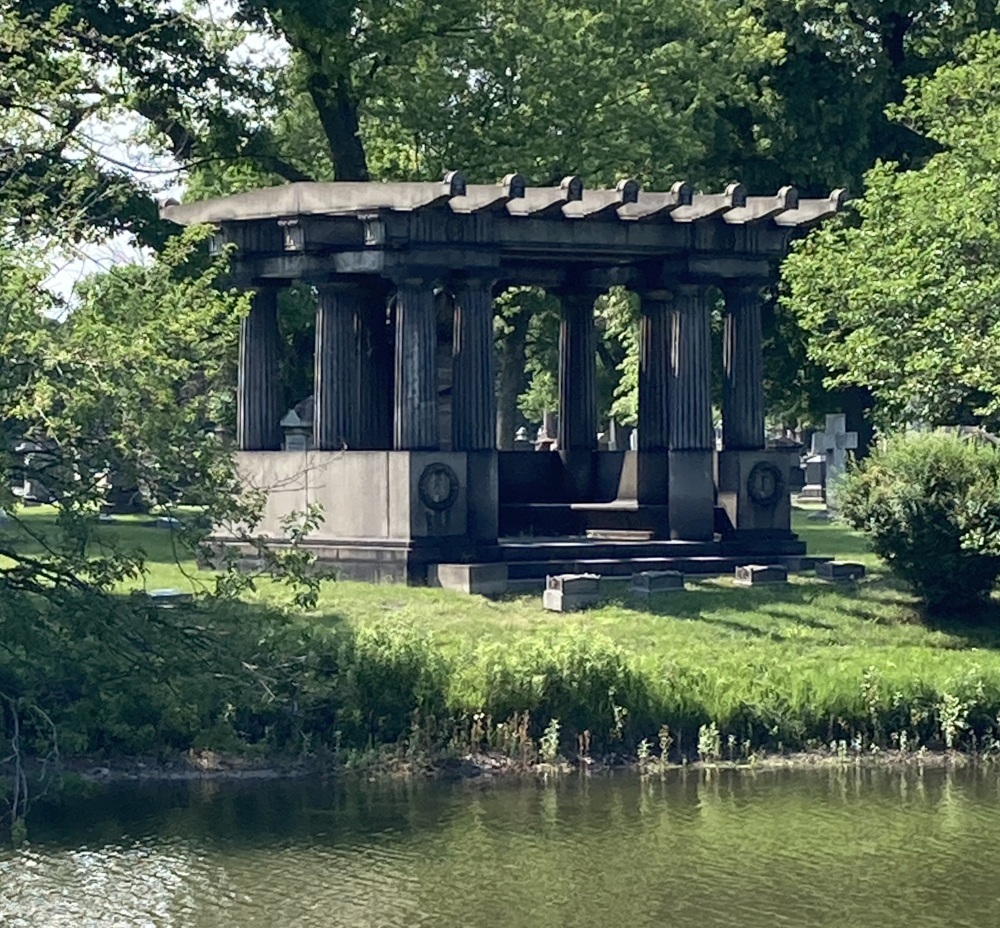
Fuller's tomb at Oak Woods Cemetery

Fuller died on December 14, 1900, from amyotrophic lateral sclerosis, leaving an estate valued at $3 million (equivalent to $116.1 million in 2025). His tomb at Oak Woods Cemetery in Chicago, designed by New York architect Bruce Price, is one of the largest in the cemetery.

== The Fuller Company after Fuller ==
Following the death of Fuller, Harry S. Black, Fuller's son-in-law, took over as president of the Fuller Company and aggressively expanded its capitalization and operations, merging it with smaller companies, and bringing on to the company's board of directors such men as Henry Morgenthau, Sr., former New York City mayor – and Tammany Hall man – Hugh J. Grant, and banker James Stillman and creating what became known as the "skyscraper trust". In 1902, he took the company public, listing it on the New York Stock Exchange, and then put together a merger with Alliance and New York Realty to create a new $66 million company, the United States Realty and Construction Company; the Fuller Company – which by then had offices in New York, Chicago, Boston, Baltimore, Philadelphia, Washington DC, and Pittsburgh – would remain an independent company under the umbrella of the new entity.

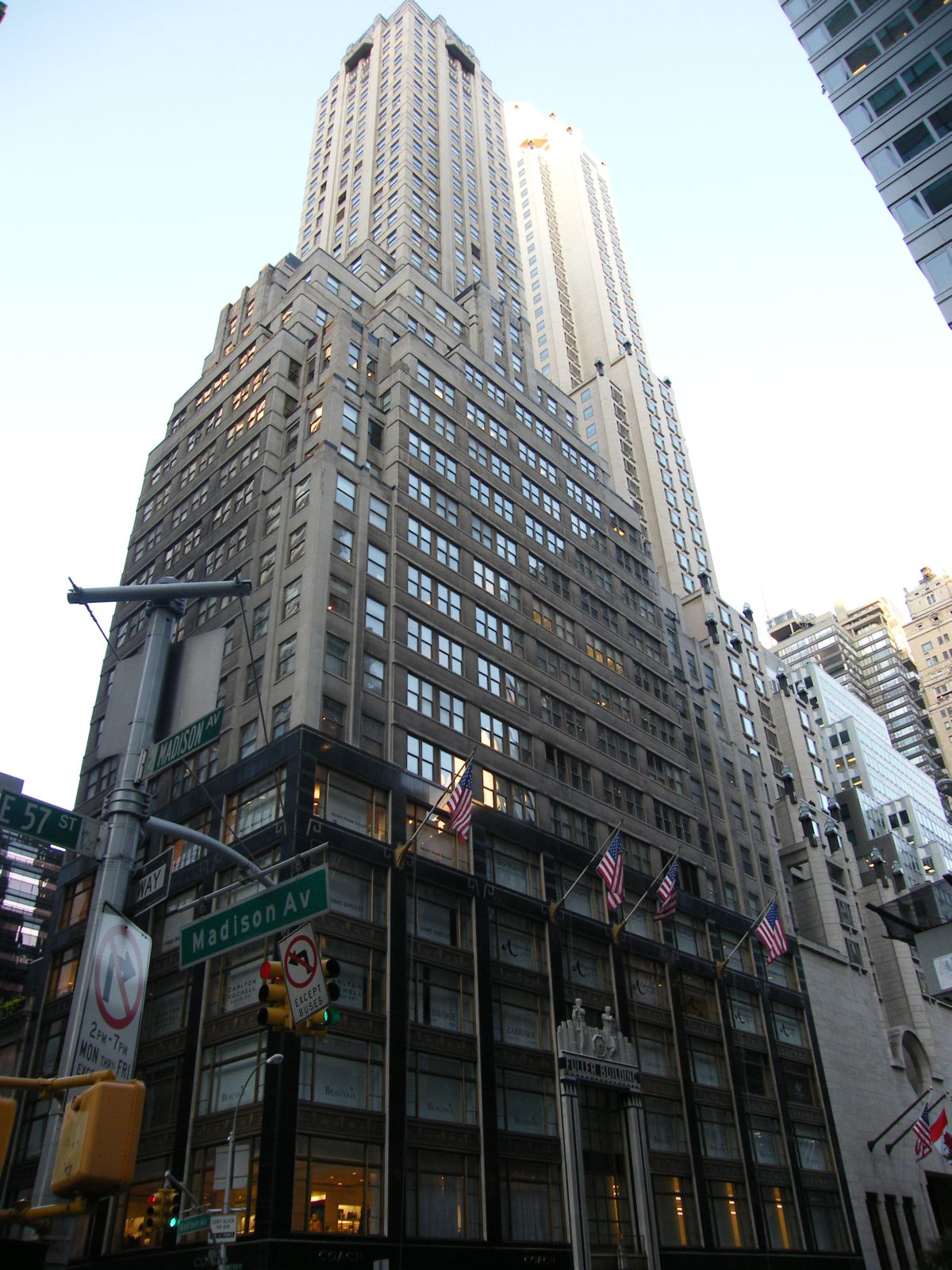
The Fuller Company moved into the Fuller Building at 57th Street and Madison Avenue in 1929.

Black announced:

The new company will undoubtedly enter foreign fields, with the view of introducing steel construction in cities like London, Paris and Berlin. Its relations will be very close to the United States Steel Corporation, and naturally, as we will be the largest consumers of structural steel in the world, our terms as to price and delivery will be most favorable.

Indeed, Black had constructed the new company's board of directors with an eye for its need for steel and rail transport. It included Charles Schwab of U.S. Steel, Cornelius Vanderbilt, Charles Tweed of Southern Pacific, Charles Francis Adams, former head of Union Pacific, and representatives from J.P. Morgan and the Mutual Life Insurance Company. Since Black had put together U.S. Realty, he naturally expected to be named the company's president, but the board passed over him and selected Bradish Johnson, president of New York Realty, one of the firms folded into the new conglomerate.

U.S. Realty's stock never performed as expected, although the members of the board did receive substantial salaries and large dividends on the stock they owned, even as the company was underperforming. When the Fuller Company was implicated in the corruption of the building trades union leader, Samuel Parks, its stock fell. Board members dumped their stock and left the company, but Black was buying up stock at the same time. He took control of the company, naming a new board which made him president.

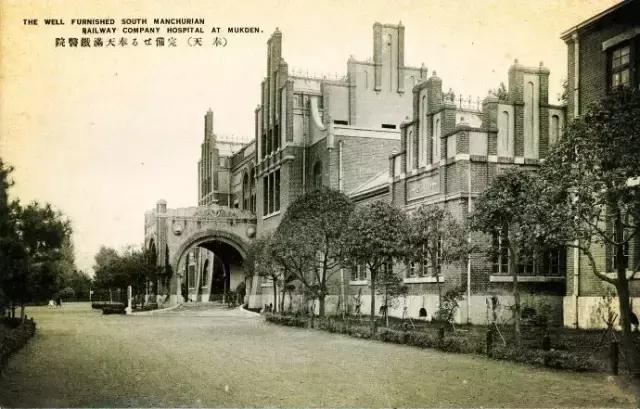
Manchuria Railway Hospital in Mukden

In 1920, together with Mitsubishi, he founded the George A.Fuller Company of The Orient Ltd. in Tokyo and built several private and government office buildings in the Far East Asia.

Among the many buildings constructed by the Fuller Company under Black were the Lincoln Memorial (1914–1922), Arlington Memorial Amphitheater (1915–1920), Tomb of the Unknown Soldier (Arlington) (1921), Freer Gallery of Art (1916–1923), Pennsylvania Station (1910), Hotel Pennsylvania (1919), the Flatiron Building (1902), Macy's Herald Square on Broadway and 34th Street (1902), the New York Times Building (1905), the Plaza Hotel and the Savoy-Plaza Hotel (across Fifth Avenue from it). In Chicago, Fuller built the Stevens Hotel, designed by Holabird & Roche.

The Fuller Company was acquired by the Northrop Corporation in 1971.
