= Economy of Greater Cleveland =

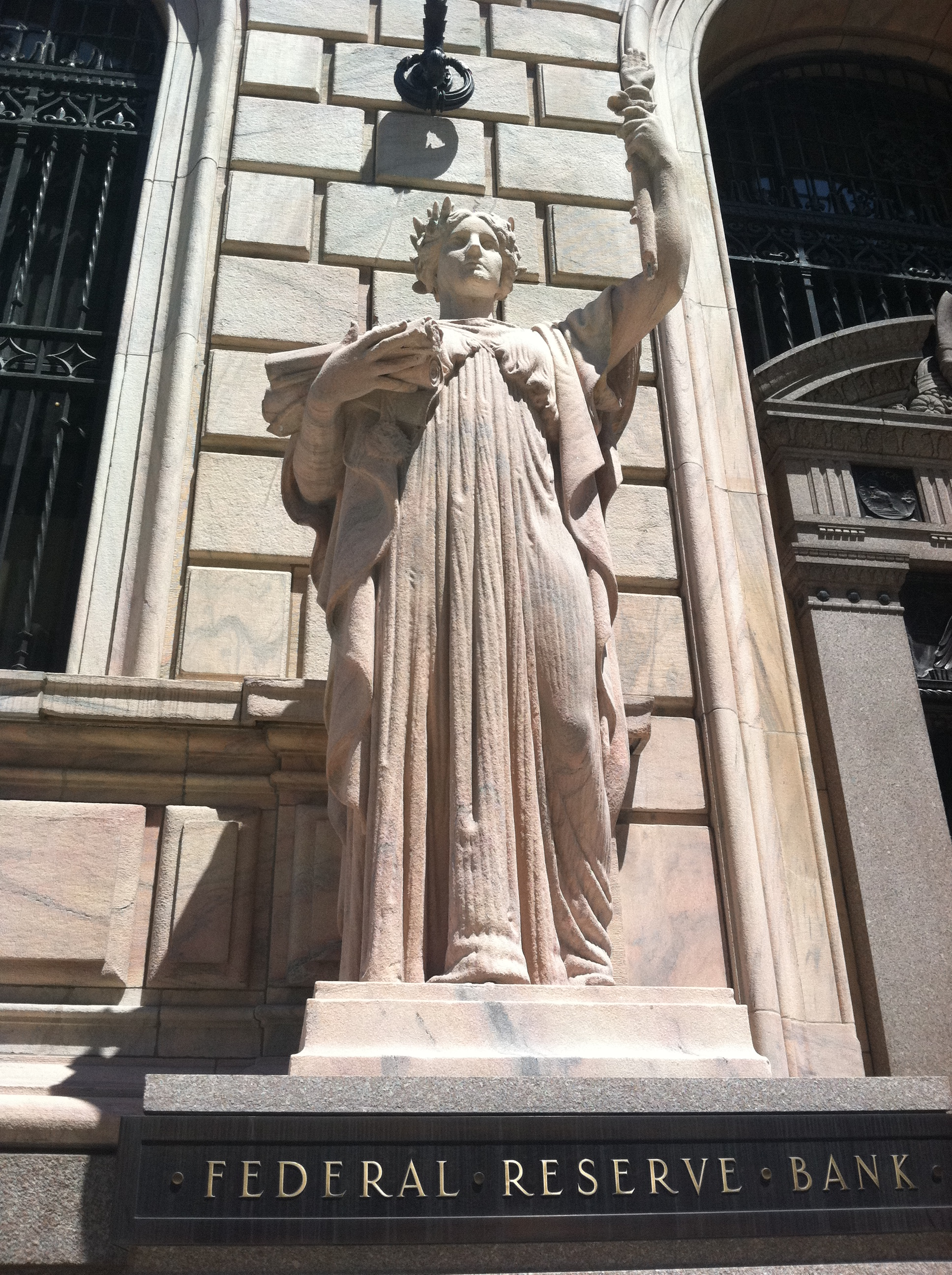
Integrity sculpture at the Federal Reserve Bank of Cleveland.

The economy of Greater Cleveland is diverse, based on healthcare, banking, finance, education, insurance, manufacturing, sports, and tech. The metropolitan area based in Cleveland is the 25th largest in the country, and is home to over 2.9 million people. An August 2026 analyst report by PNC found that Cleveland outperformed the state of Ohio in job growth, making Cleveland the economic leader in the state for economic growth.

== History ==
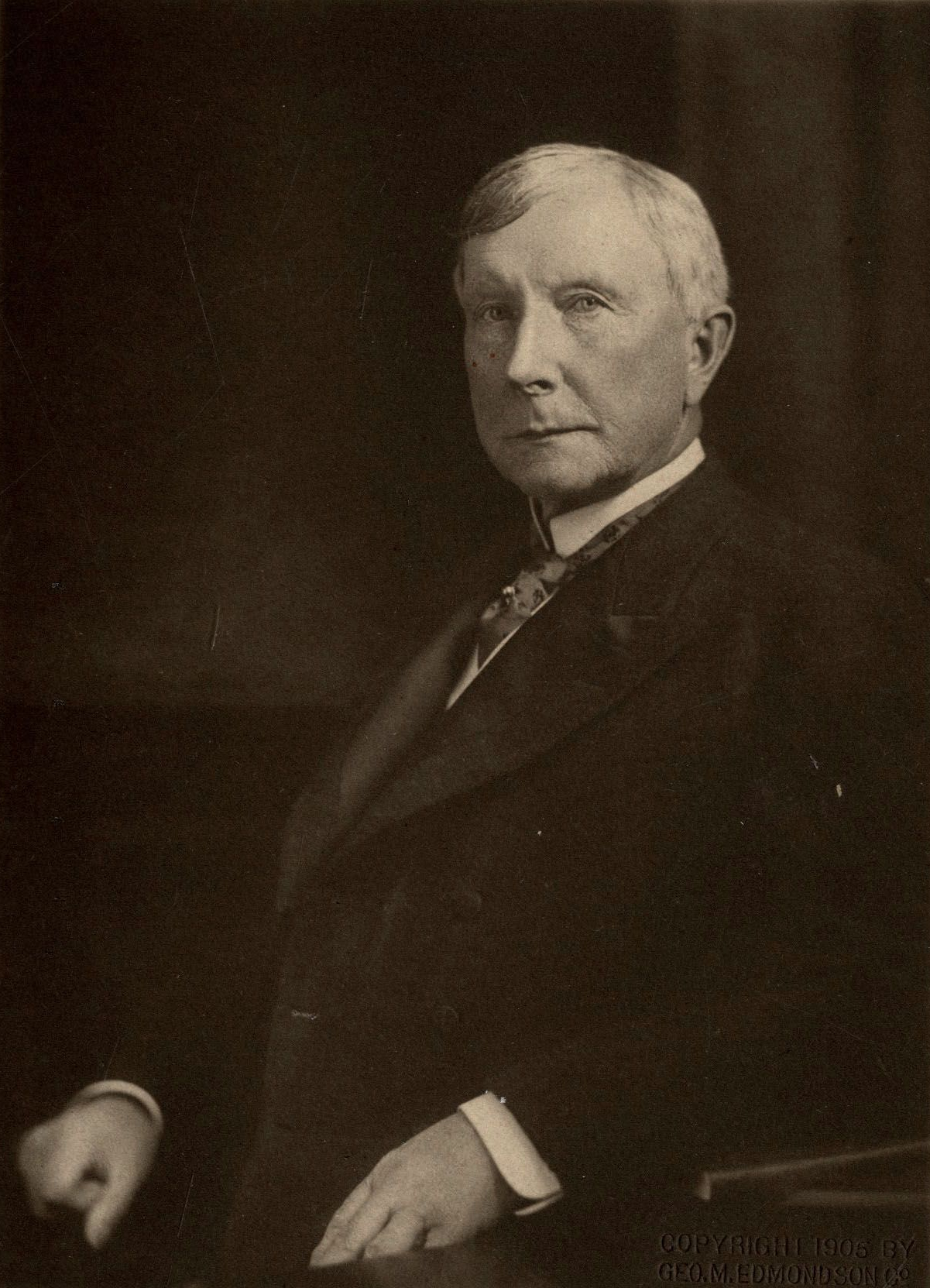
John D. Rockefeller in Cleveland, 1905

Cleveland was founded in 1796 by Moses Cleaveland and his followers. In the early 19th Century, farmers came to Cleveland to sell their goods. The building of the Erie Canal helped grow the region as well as its economy. In the 1860s, the Standard Oil Company was founded by John D. Rockefeller in the city of Cleveland. In the early 20th century, about a quarter of the region's jobs were in steel mills. The Great Depression hurt the area's economy and caused up to 36% unemployment rate. The City of Cleveland went into default in 1978 and was $30 million in debt. The area's economy improved during the 1990s. However, the Great Recession hindered the region as the City of Cleveland's unemployment rate hit 12%. Since then, the state of the metro area's economy has improved. The GDP of the region is at about $207 billion as the Cleveland economy incorporates two US government defined metropolitan statistical areas, the Cleveland MSA and Akron MSA, given that the two MSAs operate as one large area, and many Cleveland suburbs are located in Summit or Portage Counties which, per the US government, is fully assigned to the Akron MSA, even though they are Cleveland suburbs because MSA boundaries are created at full county levels.

== Largest employers ==
As of 2014, these are the largest employers in the Cleveland Metro Area.

#	Employer	# of Employees
1	Cleveland Clinic	32,251
2	University Hospitals	14,518
3	United States Federal Government	11,254
4	Progressive Insurance	8,379
5	Cuyahoga County	7,776
6	Cleveland Metropolitan School District	6,953
7	City of Cleveland	6,757
8	MetroHealth	5,823
9	Key Corp	4,812
10	Group Management Services	4,795
11	Case Western Reserve University	4,512
12	Swagelok	4,182
13	Giant Eagle	3,530
14	Heinen's Fine Foods	3,500
15	Sherwin-Williams	3,430
16	U.S. Postal Service	2,801
17	Lincoln Electric	2,800
18	Nestle	2,298
19	State of Ohio	2,288
20	Cuyahoga Community College	2,249

== Fortune 500 companies ==
There are nine companies on the Fortune 500 list that have corporate headquarters in Greater Cleveland as of 2026:

- 51 Progressive Insurance
- 104 Sherwin-Williams
- 224 Parker Hannifin
- 233 Cleveland Cliffs
- 239 Goodyear
- 307 First Energy
- 336 Key Corp
- 448 Avery Dennison
- 449 TransDigm

Additionally, there are nine other companies, that round out the full Fortune 1000.

== Banking & Finance ==
KeyBank is headquartered in Cleveland's tallest building, the Key Tower. Key employs nearly 5,000 people in Greater Cleveland. There are many banks with a presence in the Cleveland Metro Area, including Fifth-Third Bank, U.S. Bank, Bank of America, PNC, Dollar Bank, Chase, and Huntington. The Federal Reserve Bank of Cleveland was built in 1923, a time when Cleveland's population was nearly twice the size today. Third Federal S&L and First Federal Lakewood are also major banks in Cleveland.

CrossCountry Mortgage one of the largest nonbank mortgage lenders is headquartered in Cleveland's Superior Arts District and was previously headquartered in Brecksville. The City of Cleveland is also the US headquarters of the London Stock Exchange's Elite Initiatives Unit.

== Education ==
Greater Cleveland is home to several higher education institutions. These include Case Western Reserve University, Cleveland State University, Cuyahoga Community College, Oberlin College, Baldwin Wallace University, Notre Dame College, and John Carroll University. These places employ approximately 9,600 people. There are an estimated 142 High Schools in the Greater Cleveland area. The Cleveland School District is the largest school district in the region, and employs almost 7,000 staff. There are around 21,000 teachers in the Metro Area, teaching approximately 330,000 students.

== Insurance ==
The area's largest insurance company is Progressive Insurance, an international car insurance corporation, which is based in the suburb of Mayfield. 8,379 people are employed by Progressive in the region. However, Progressive's rivals, including State Farm, Allstate, Nationwide, and Geico are also prominent in Greater Cleveland.

== Manufacturing ==
Northeast Ohio's economy was dominated by manufacturing up until the mid 20th century. Between 1990 and 2012, the area experienced a 41 percent decline in manufacturing jobs. More recently manufacturing, especially of steel, has been on a slight upswing. A study from Cleveland State has shown a bounce back after the Great Recession for the manufacturing industry. Between 2010 and 2012, the area saw a net growth in manufacturing jobs, the first time in a decade.

== Healthcare ==
Greater Cleveland's economy has shifted to an economy of medicine and health. The two largest employers in Cuyahoga County are Cleveland Clinic and University Hospitals, respectively. The Cleveland Clinic has 83,000 employees worldwide, and a $28.2B economic impact in Cleveland. Both are major factors in the region's economy. University Hospitals is estimated to have a $7.7 billion impact on Ohio's economy. Between 1990 and 2012, 107,000 healthcare related jobs were created in the region, a 55% increase. Healthcare related jobs have surpassed the number of manufacturing related jobs in the area. Greater Cleveland health care industry is a major sector of the local economy.

== Sports ==
Sports are another factor of the local economy in Northeast Ohio. All three of the Big 4 teams located in Cleveland generate a major economic impact. The Cleveland Browns are considered to have a less of a positive economic impact on the city, both because they only play 8 games in the stadium a year, far less than the Cavs and Guardians, and because of their poor playing. The Cleveland Guardians' strong performance in recent years has helped the local economy. Postseason home games were estimated to have a $3 million economic impact, and home World Series games had an estimated $10 million economic impact. LeBron James, a former Cleveland Cavaliers superstar, was also a factor of Cleveland's economy, more specifically near the FieldHouse. The Cavaliers' successes in the mid-2010s have generated positive results for the area's economy. A new professional women's (WNBA) team, the Cleveland Sirens, was recently announced and will begin playing their first games in 2028.

== Arts and culture ==
The nonprofit arts and culture sector is a measurable component of Greater Cleveland’s economy. In 2022 Cuyahoga County’s nonprofit arts and culture industry generated $533.2 million in economic activity. In 2023, the county’s public arts agency, Cuyahoga Arts & Culture, reported awarding more than $12 million in grants to 275 nonprofit organizations. Large anchor institutions also contribute substantially to regional impact. A 2022 report on Cleveland’s “big four” cultural institutions—the Cleveland Museum of Art, The Cleveland Orchestra, Playhouse Square, and the Rock & Roll Hall of Fame—estimated their combined annual economic impact at more than $800 million (2019 data).

== Tech ==
The technology industry is prominent in Greater Cleveland, specifically health related technology. According to Forbes, Cleveland could be the next tech hub. 180 tech companies have started in the local area. Cleveland's economy is often said to be transitioning from a manufacturing based economy to a health-tech based economy.

== See also ==
- Economy of Ohio
- Greater Cleveland
