= Andover College =

Andover College may refer to:

- Andover College (Hampshire), a college in Andover, Hampshire, England, UK
- Andover College (Maine), a college in Portland, Maine, US
