= Third Federal S&L =

American regional bank headquartered in Cleveland, Ohio

TFS Financial Corporation
- Company type: Public
- Traded as: Nasdaq: TFSL; Russell 1000 component
- Industry: Financial services
- Founded: 1938; 87 years ago
- Founders: Ben S. Stefanski; Gerome Stefanski
- Headquarters: Cleveland, Ohio, U.S.
- Key people: Marc A. Stefanski (president & CEO)
- Products: Banking
- Revenue: over US$420 million (2017)
- Total assets: US$14.5 billion (2019)
- Number of employees: 1,005 (2021)
- Parent: TFS Financial Corporation
- Website: thirdfederal.com
- Footnotes / references Bauer Financial Rating *****

Third Federal S&L (also known as TFSL, Third Federal Savings and Loan, Third Federal of Cleveland, Third Federal Savings and Loan Association of Cleveland, or simply Third Federal) is a major savings and loan association in Cleveland, Ohio, founded in 1938 amid the Great Depression as Cleveland was the 5th largest city at the time with many young homeowners, before the United States entry into World War II. It does business in Ohio, Florida, California, Colorado, Connecticut, Georgia, Illinois, Indiana, Iowa, Kentucky, Maryland, Massachusetts, Michigan, Minnesota, Missouri, New Hampshire, New Jersey, New York, North Carolina, Oregon, Pennsylvania, Tennessee, Virginia, Washington, and Wisconsin

It is considered a mid-sized bank overall and is a member of the Mid-Sized Bank Coalition of America. It has significant operations in Ohio and Florida. In addition, it owns properties in several states, including Ohio, Illinois, New York, and Florida, though most of it is centered in Ohio. It lends funds to people to buy homes in 25 states as of 2019. It is headquartered in the Cleveland neighborhood of Broadway-Slavic Village. Its current CEO is Marc A. Stefanski, the son of Ben S. Stefanski, the association's founder and long-time president. It holds over 11 billion in assets as of 2019. It has over 40 branches and is traded on the NASDAQ as TFSL. It has held the highest rating possible from Bauer Financial, which is a banking industry rating service in Coral Gables. TFSL has held this rating since 1994. Forbes also named it Best In-State Bank at No. 90 in 2019, ahead of major player KeyCorp at No. 97.

In recent years, TFSL has been instrumental in trying to revitalize the once desolate Cleveland neighborhood of Slavic Village. It has pumped millions into properties and lending there. As an anchor in the Slavic Village neighborhood since its founding in 1938, devoted more time and energy to supporting programs in education and housing to stop the slide of the neighborhood and support redevelopment efforts. Trailside Slavic Village, a housing complex of new homes in the inner city, saw the company as a developer. Phase I of the complex broke ground in 2013 and is fully sold. Phase II was developed and sold out in 2018. Plans for Phase III are currently underway. Through The Third Federal Foundation, the MyCom Broadway P-16 program was developed, bringing together non-profits, government agencies, and businesses to support education in the Slavic Village neighborhood. The program supports children and families through wraparound services essential to school success. In the last several years, schools in the neighborhood have gone from failing to passing grades in state testing They have been criticized for being slow to utilize mobile technology to reach their wide customer base, thereby lagging behind bigger competitors in the markets it serves. Still an important asset to Cleveland, it has consistently been named one of the best banks in the city and state

== Founding ==
On May 7, 1938, Ben S. Stefanski and his wife Gerome began operations with $50,000 in capital and its first president was Wladyslaw J. Nowak. At the time, the association was provided with the 50,000 to start the savings and loan with help from the Slavic Village community which is just west of the Bank's HQ. Initially, the organization focused on immigrant families, mostly Polish but soon expanded their clientele. The company has remained in its 1938 neighborhood since its founding but has expanded to operating offices in southern Ohio and Florida. Stefanski once said that he believed he was "Helping the working man attain a home of his own." Mr. Stefanski retired in 1987, at which time his son Marc was appointed CEO, a position he holds as of January 2019.

== Headquarters ==
The headquarters sits at the prominent intersection at 7007 Broadway Avenue. The "building" is in reality a 250,000SF complex of interconnected structures that grew over the years as the company continued to expand operations. The headquarters still sits on the ground where the company was founded in 1938, at the corner of Broadway and Forman avenues. The complex can be reached by taking the I-77 Fleet Avenue exit.

== Housing Market Crisis ==
In 2008, Cleveland's Slavic Village was Ground Zero for the mortgage crisis. A once immigrant neighborhood had fallen victim to sub-prime lenders and mortgage brokers who sold, then resold houses for mortgages never to be repaid, by landlords who would never see the homes prior to purchase, or even after. During that time, when other large banks and lenders accepted government-backed TARP funding to stay afloat, Third Federal relied on the company's strong capital position, and customers who continued to pay their mortgages during that time.

== Bank History Timeline ==
- 1938 - Founded in Cleveland by Ben S. Stefanski and his wife, with $50,000 in assets.
- 1948 - Assets total $9.7 million
- 1958 - Merged with Lincoln Heights Savings and Loan, thereby expanding services to Tremont, a neighborhood south of downtown.
- 1963 - Has over 65,000 customers and $150 million in assets
- 1977 - Won a controversial lawsuit against the Fireman's Fund Insurance Company and was awarded $100,000 in damages
- 1982 - Marc A. Stefanski appointed Vice President of Operations
- 1983 - 16 Branch offices and over $1 billion in assets
- 1987 - Now worth $2 billion, Ben S. Stefanski departs, Marc A. announced as President & CEO
- 1988 - Bauer gives it first of 5-star ratings. The company has achieved that rating each quarter since that time
- 1989 - named best operated Savings and Loan in the country, by the FDIC in Washington.
- 1999 - purchased OceanMark Bank in Florida for 12.5 million
- 2007 - TFSL goes public and starts trading on the NASDAQ
- 2008 - Reaches agreement with Federal Regulators over loan portfolio during housing crisis
- 2013 - $11 billion in assets, Major developer of Trailside Slavic Village
- 2019 - Holds over $14.5 billion in assets with 45 branches, 7 loan offices and a network of Jeanie ATMs

== See also ==
- Economy of Greater Cleveland
