= Society for Savings Building =

Building in Cleveland, Ohio

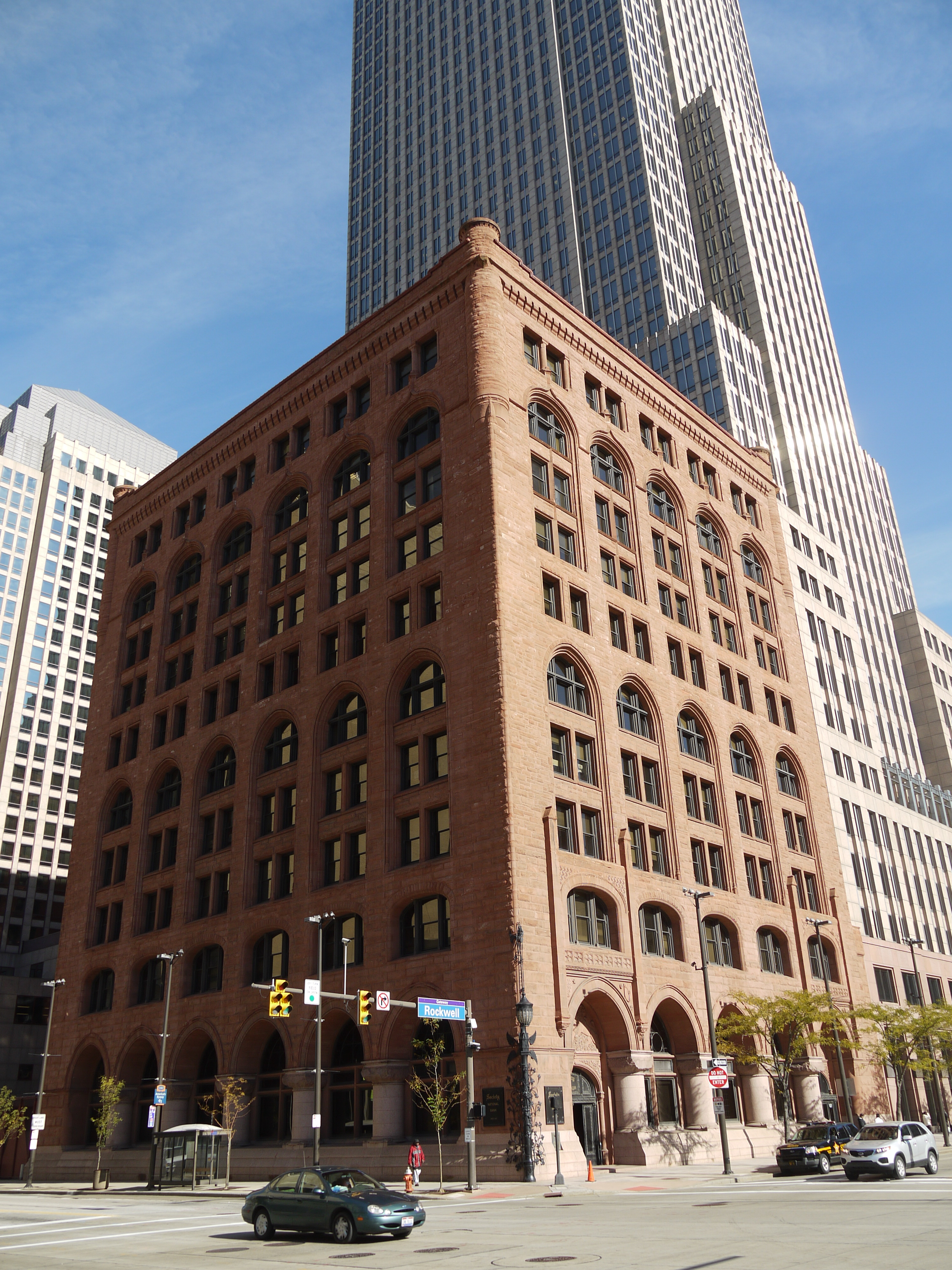
- Interactive map of the Society for Savings Building area

General information
- Location: 127 Public Square; Cleveland, Ohio
- Construction started: 1889
- Completed: 1890
- Opening: 1890

Height
- Roof: 152 ft (46 m)

Technical details
- Floor count: 10

Design and construction
- Architect: John Wellborn Root
- Developer: Society for Savings
- Society for Savings Building
- U.S. National Register of Historic Places
- Location within Cleveland Location within Ohio Location within the United States
- Location: Cleveland, Ohio
- Coordinates: 41°30′2″N 81°41′40″W
- Built: 1890
- Architect: Burnham & Root
- Architectural style: Late Victorian
- NRHP reference No.: 76001401
- Added to NRHP: November 07, 1976

The Society for Savings Building, also known as the Society Corp. Building, is a high-rise building on Public Square in Downtown Cleveland, Ohio, United States. The building was constructed for the Cleveland-based Society for Savings bank in 1889, and stood as the tallest building in Cleveland until 1896, when it was surpassed by the 221-foot (67 m) Guardian Bank Building. The building stands 152 feet (46 m) tall, with 10 floors. The Society for Savings Building is often considered to be the first modern skyscraper in Cleveland and the state of Ohio. It was designed by John Wellborn Root of the Chicago-based architectural firm Burnham & Root.

== Design ==
The Society for Savings Building was designed with a combination of Gothic, Romanesque, and Renaissance architectural styles. It contains elements of each in its granite pillars, arched window frames and red sandstone facade.

== History ==
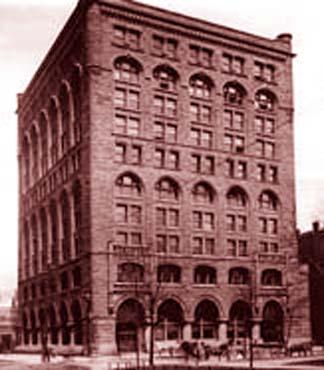
The Society for Savings Building in 1910

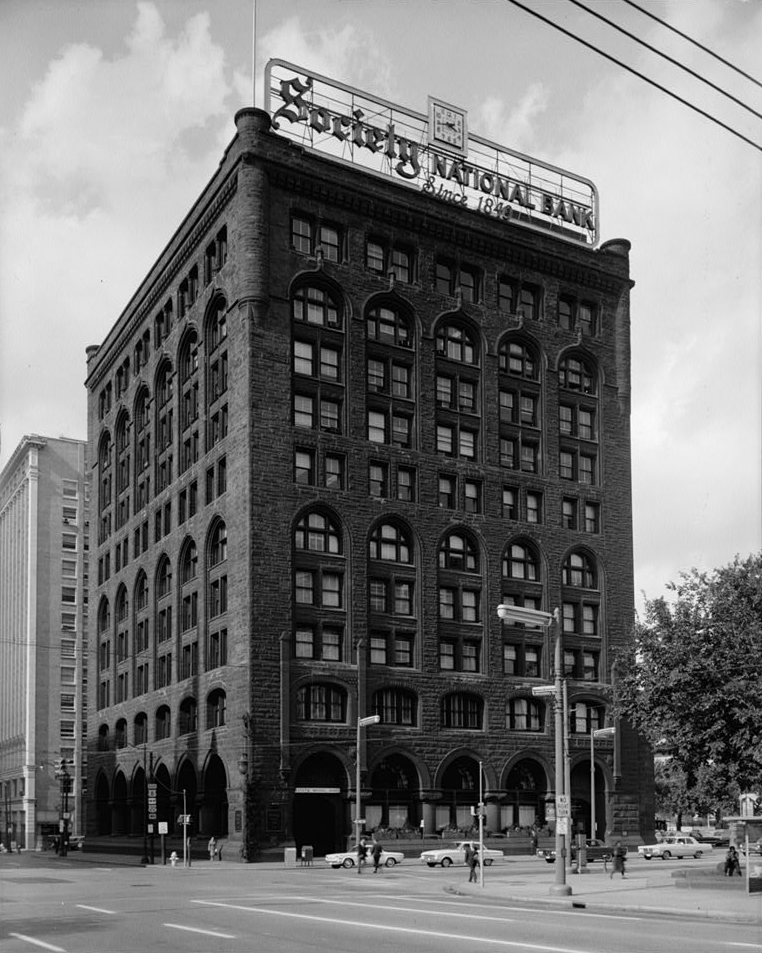
The Society for Savings Building in 1965

The Society for Savings Building was constructed to serve as office space for Cleveland's Society for Savings bank. Though structurally complete in late 1889, the building did not officially open until June 23, 1890. The building was at the time dubbed "Ohio's skyscraper" by locals, as it was the first modern high-rise building to be constructed in the city and the state. It went on to serve as the headquarters of the Brotherhood of Locomotive Engineers, or BLE, from 1896 until 1910. The building was listed on the National Register of Historic Places on November 7, 1976.

In modern times, the building is one of several structures located at Key Center. Key Tower (formerly known as the Society Center), the tallest building in Cleveland and in the state of Ohio, was built adjacent to the Society for Savings Building by Society Bank 100 years after it; the lobbies of the two buildings were integrated, and in the process the Society for Savings Building underwent an extensive restoration and renovation project headed by the architectural firm of van Dijk, Pace, Westlake & Partners. The building contains 147,089 square feet (13,665 m^{2}) of office space.

== See also ==
- Marriott at Key Center
- List of tallest buildings in Cleveland
