= Luzon Building =

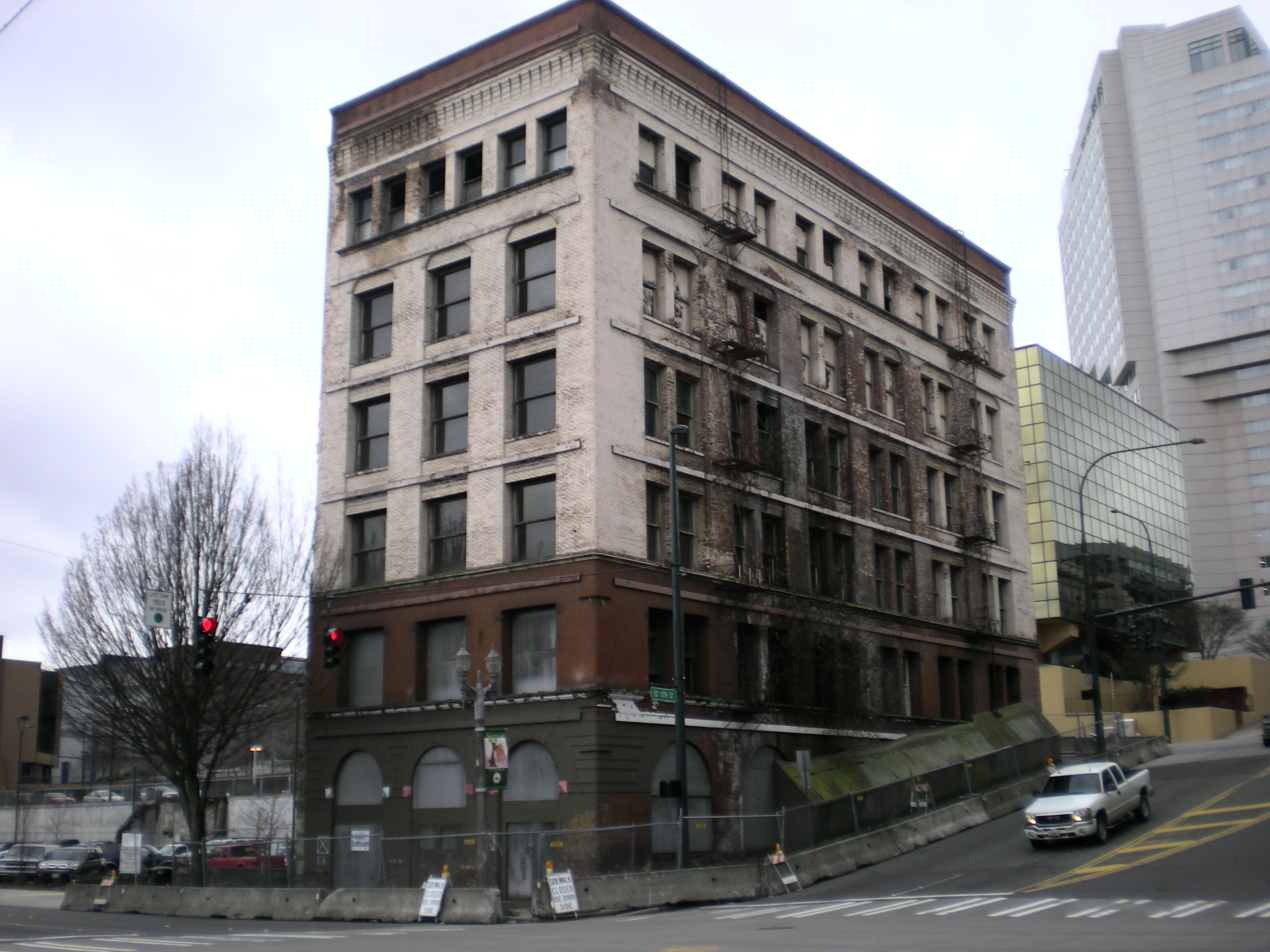
- Luzon Building prior to demolition
- Interactive map of the Luzon Building area
- Former names: Pacific National Bank; Vanderbilt Building; Argonne Building; State Building

General information
- Type: Commercial offices
- Architectural style: Chicago school, commercial style
- Location: 1302 Pacific Avenue; Tacoma, Washington
- Coordinates: 47.251155°N 122.438507°W
- Construction started: 1890
- Completed: approx. 8 February 1891
- Demolished: 26 September 2009

Height
- Roof: 88.00 ft (26.82 m)

Technical details
- Floor count: 6
- Lifts/elevators: 1

Design and construction
- Architect: Burnham and Root
- Pacific National Bank Building
- U.S. National Register of Historic Places
- Location within Washington (state)
- Area: less than one acre
- Built: 1891
- NRHP reference No.: 80004008
- Added to NRHP: 7 March 1980

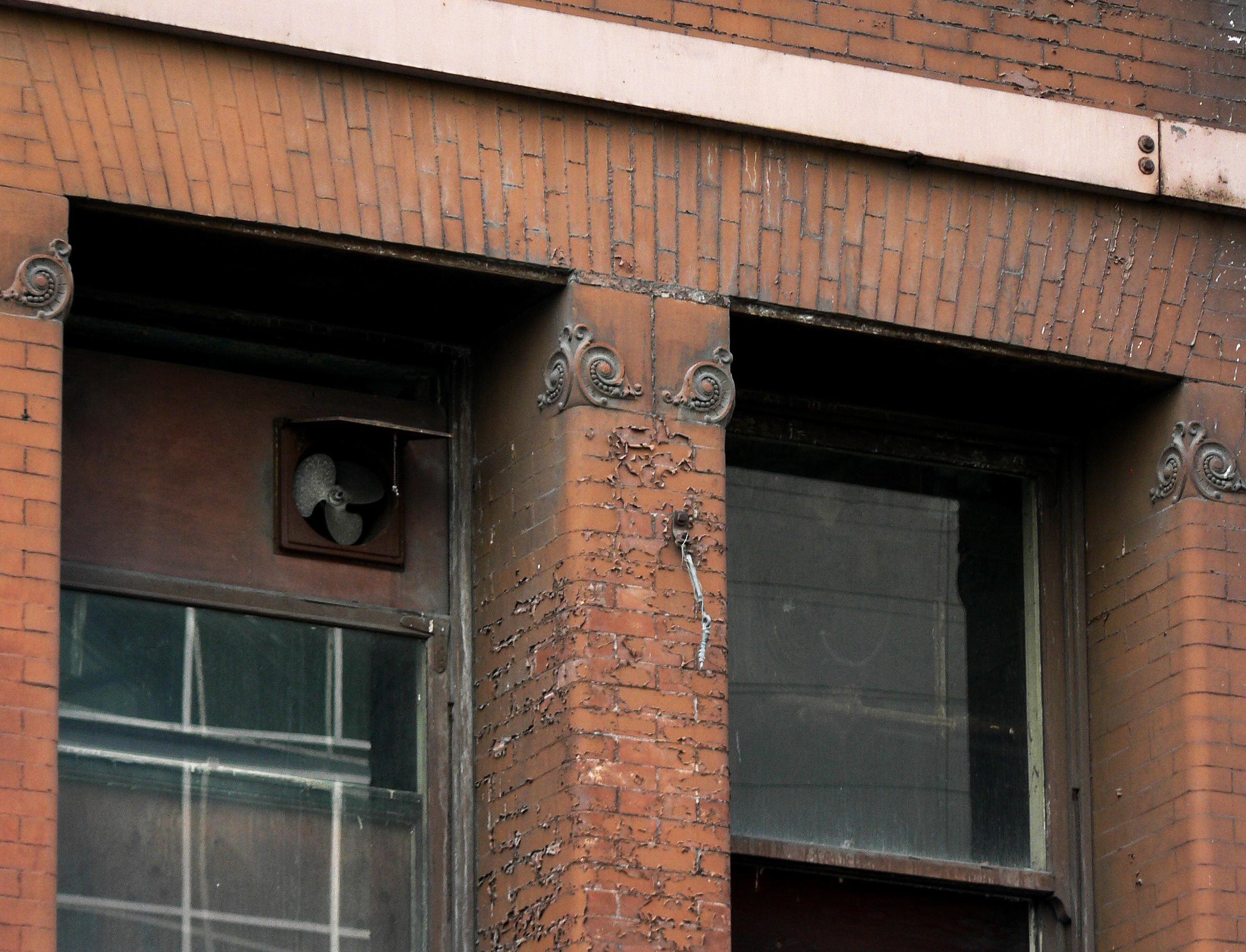
Window detail, Luzon Building prior to demolition

The Luzon Building was a historic six-story building at 1302 Pacific Avenue in downtown Tacoma, Washington designed by Chicago architects Daniel Burnham and John Root.

The Luzon was built in 1890–1891 as the Pacific National Bank, which had a first floor entrance on Pacific Avenue and a second floor entrance on Commerce Street. Both floors contained businesses such as W.L. Davis & Sons Co. Furniture and Chaddy & Son Tailors in addition to the bank; the upper four stories were living space.

The building was named "Luzon" in 1901, after the largest island in the Philippines, where on July 1 of that year William Howard Taft inaugurated establishment of American civil government of the Philippines.

The building was demolished on September 26, 2009, despite efforts by local preservationists.
