= Phenix Building (Chicago) =

Office building in Chicago, Illinois

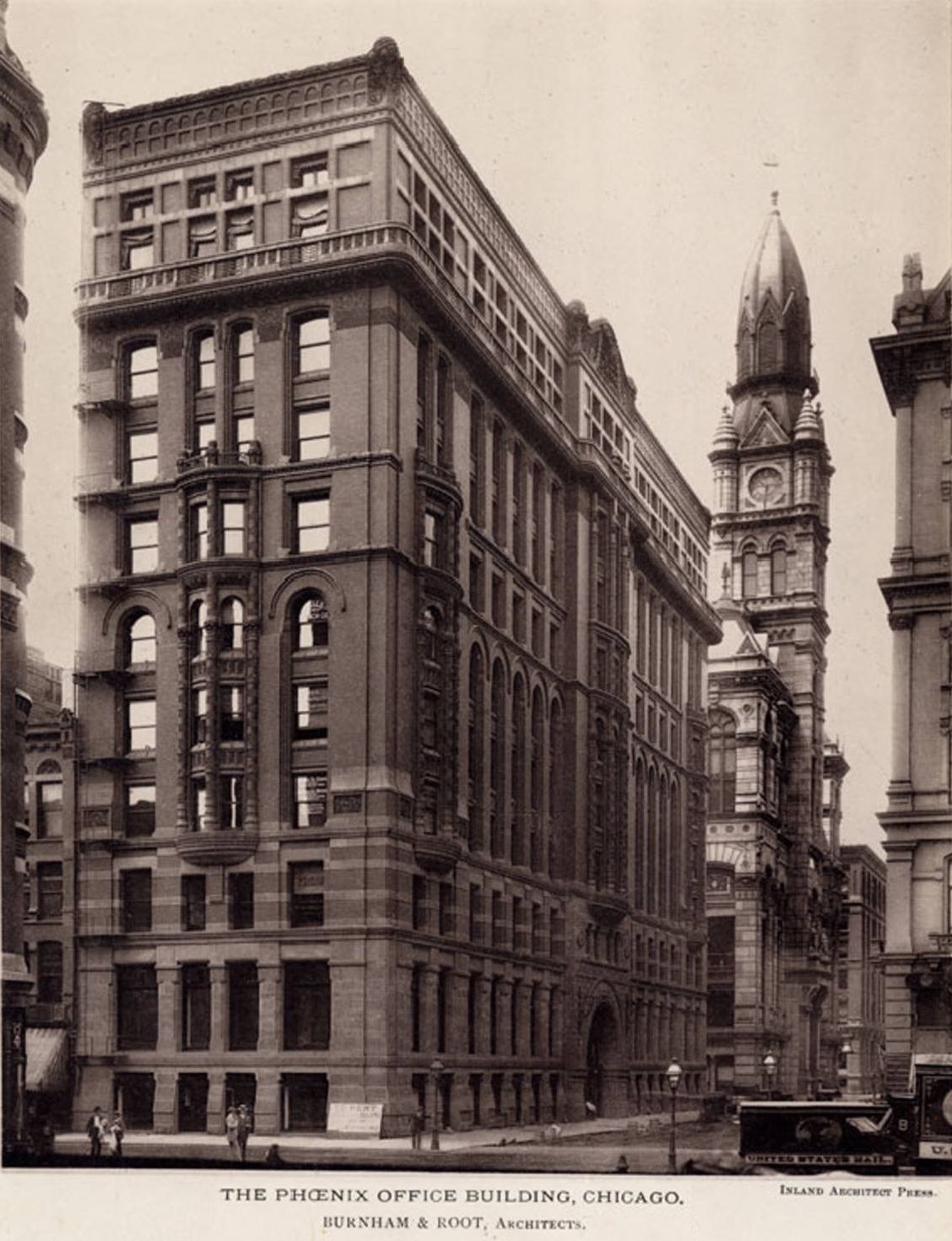
- The Phenix Building as built, 1887
- Former names: Western Union Building; F.C. Austin Building

General information
- Status: demolished (1957)
- Type: high-rise office
- Architectural style: Romanesque Revival
- Location: 138 (now 111 W.) Jackson Boulevard, Chicago, Illinois
- Coordinates: 41.8780°N 87.6314°W
- Construction started: 1886; 140 years ago
- Completed: 1887; 139 years ago
- Demolished: 1957; 69 years ago
- Owner: The Phenix Mutual Fire Insurance Company (as built)

Height
- Tip: about 151 feet

Technical details
- Floor count: 11 (as built) +2 added in 1892
- Floor area: about 125,000
- Lifts/elevators: 5

Design and construction
- Architect: Burnham and Root

The Phenix (aka Phoenix) Building was an office building in Chicago designed by the noted Chicago architectural firm of Burnham and Root. It was built by the Phenix Mutual Fire Insurance Company of Brooklyn, New York and occupied the block fronting Jackson Boulevard between Pacific Avenue (now LaSalle Street) and Clark Street. When completed in 1887, the building was seen as "the latest addition to Chicago's magnificent architectural structures". It was later owned by the Western Union Telegraph Company, who sold the building to the manufacturer and philanthropist Frederick C. Austin (1853–1931) in 1922. Austin donated it to Northwestern University in 1929 with the understanding that the income derived from it would "provide scholarships for the training of business executives". The building was demolished in 1957 and replaced by what today is known as the TransUnion Building, a twenty-four story office building designed by A. Epstein and Sons.

== Features ==
The footprint of the building measured 215 feet on Jackson Boulevard, but was only 50 feet deep. It cost $1 million to complete, not including the $400,000 paid for the lot (other sources state $100,000) which to this point was "covered with shanties". The building was built with a structural steel frame and was advertised as being "absolutely fireproof". The exterior base was sheathed in Vert Island Stone from Ontario, Canada, with the upper floors finished with red terra cotta and St. Louis brick. The lobby, including the walls and stairs, was finished using white marble, as were the interior hallways in the rest of the building, with the woodwork in the offices being of Cuban mahogany. The building had windows on all four sides. The structure was considered groundbreaking in its day in the quality of the interior finish that it provided, in that "As an office building for office purposes, the Phenix Company have gone further than any company in the West, in placing as elegant finish in a building devoted to purely commercial purposes, an example that will be followed until art will find a place where before rough walls and plain finish were considered all that was necessary."

Originally built with eleven stories above ground, two floors were added in 1892 by the Western Union Telegraph Company, a subsequent owner.

== Contractors and suppliers ==
- Brick – Lockwood and Kimbell, Chicago
- Terra Cotta – The Northwest Terra-Cotta Company, Chicago
- Vert Island sandstone – Mr. Henry Kerber, Chicago
- Marble work – Davidson & Sons, Chicago
- Ornamental iron work – Paulsen & Eger, New York City
- Ornamental hardware – Yale & Towne Manufacturing Co., Chicago with Orr & Lockett, Chicago. The Phenix Building is credited as being the first instance for which hardware was custom-designed for use throughout the building.
- Painting, glazing and woodwork finishing – S.S. Barry & Son, Chicago
- Elevators – W.E. Hale & Co., Chicago
- Gas and electrical fixtures – T.W. Wilmarth & Co., Chicago
- Woodwork, including the office furniture – Edward E. Swiney, Chicago
- Washstands, water closets and related fixtures – J.L. Mott Iron Works, New York

== Tenants ==
The Phenix Mutual Fire Insurance Company occupied the top two floors of the building as its Southern and Western Departments headquarters, and leased the remainder of the space. Because of its proximity to the city's many railroad terminals, the building provided office space to a number of railway-oriented manufacturers and suppliers, along with several of the area's passenger and freight railway companies. The building was purchased by the Western Union Telegraph Co. as its headquarters in 1892 for $1.5 million, the highest price paid to that date for any building located downtown.

== Gallery ==
The Phenix Building and related images

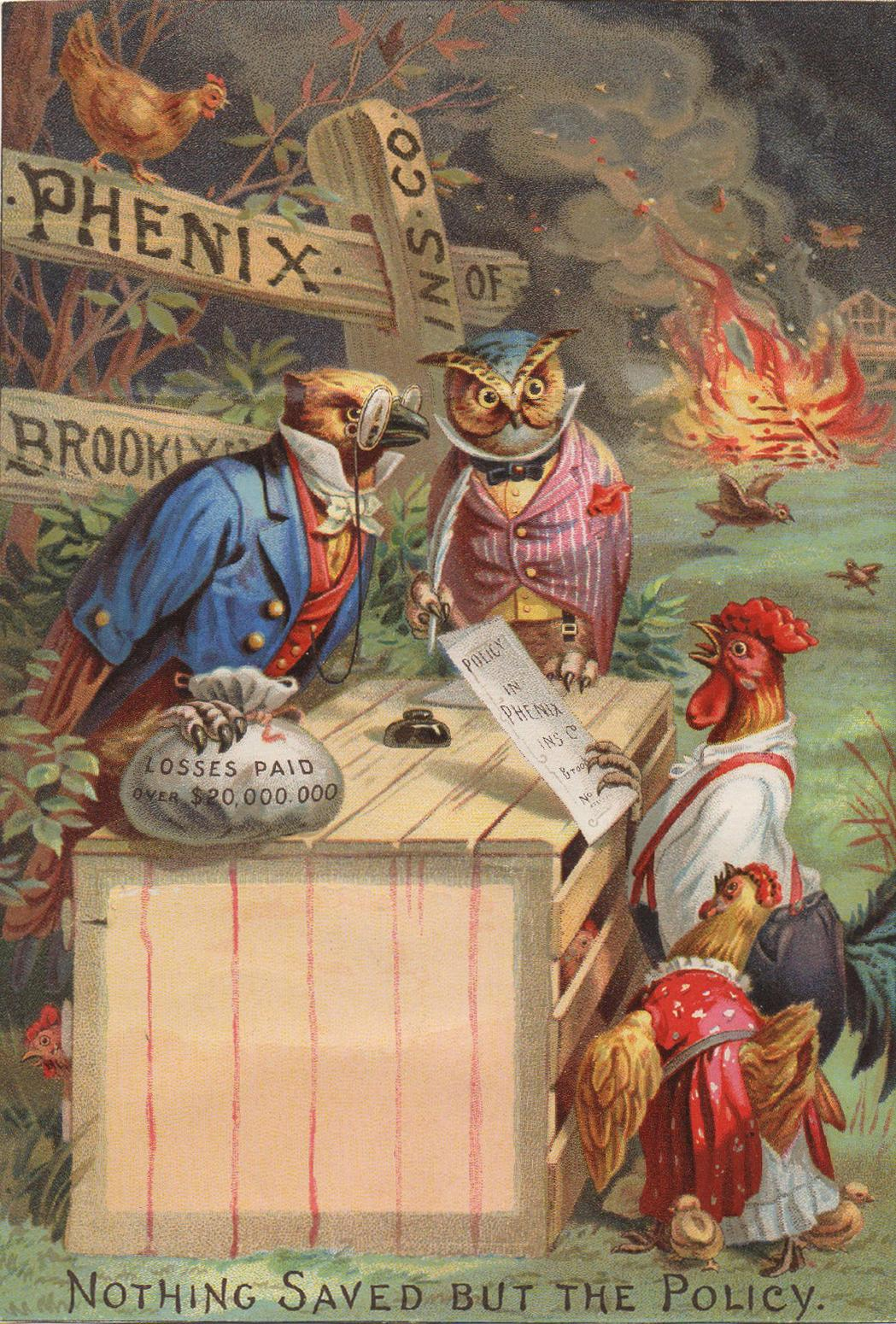
Advertisement for The Phenix Mutual Fire Insurance Co., c.1895

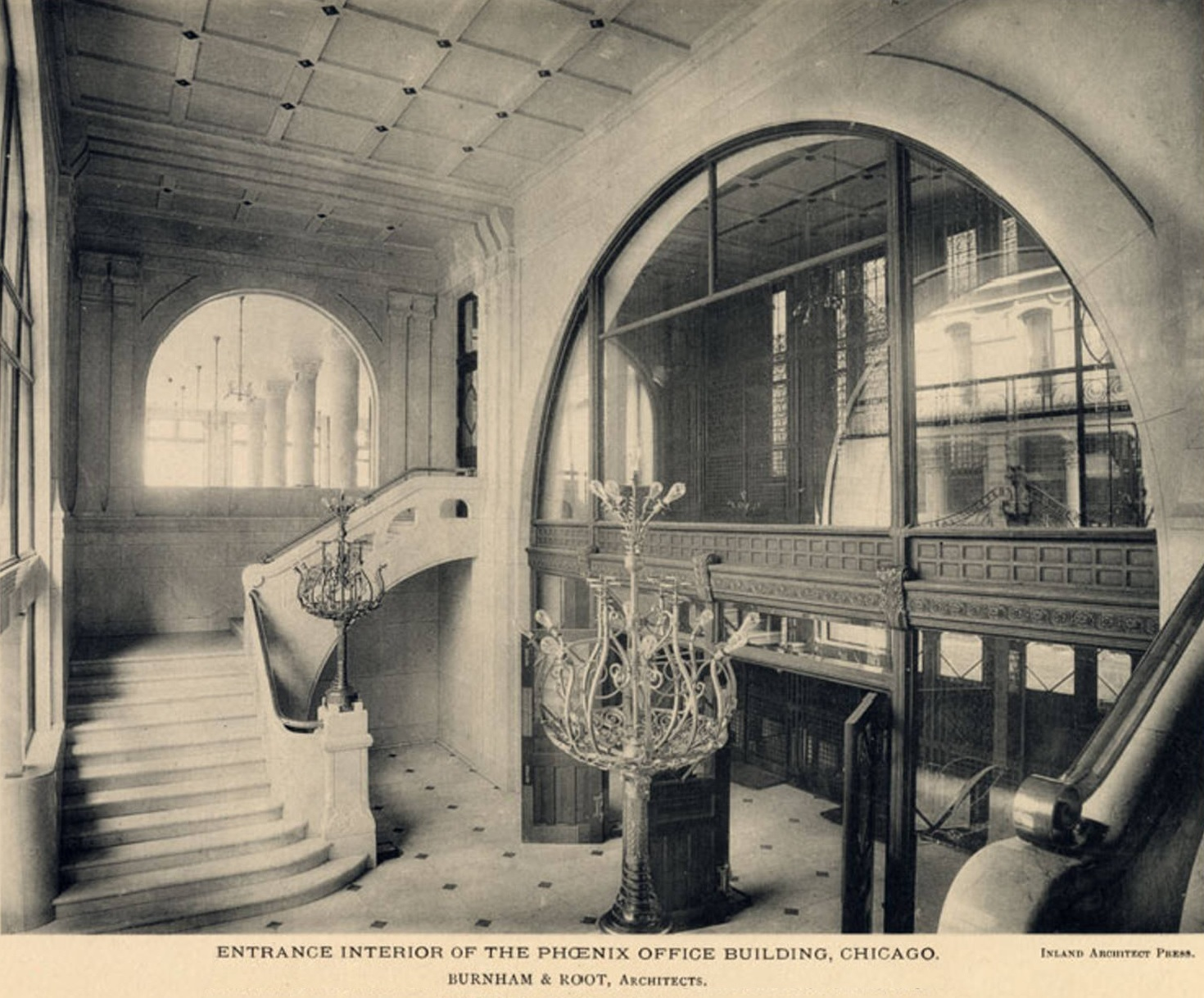
The Phenix Building lobby measured 20 x 45 feet, with the entrance arch leading to it from the outside having a span of 24 feet.

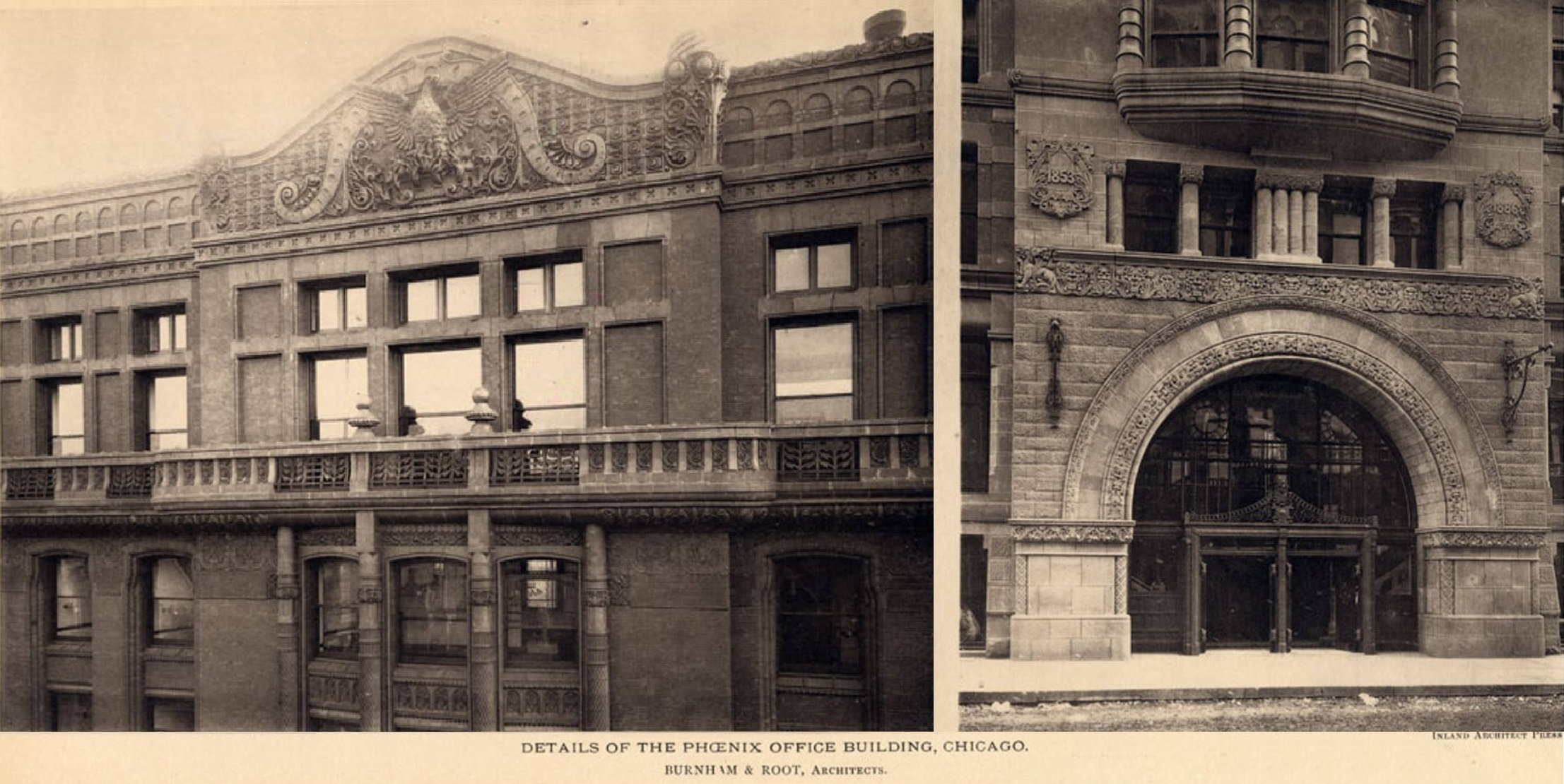
Main façade details. Note the mythical phoenix and namesake of the building incorporated into the cornice as high-relief sculpture. The noted critic and essayist Montgomery Schuyler had this to say about the entrance: "If beauty be its own excuse for being, this entrance needs no other, for assuredly it is one of the most artistic and beautiful works American architecture has to show..."

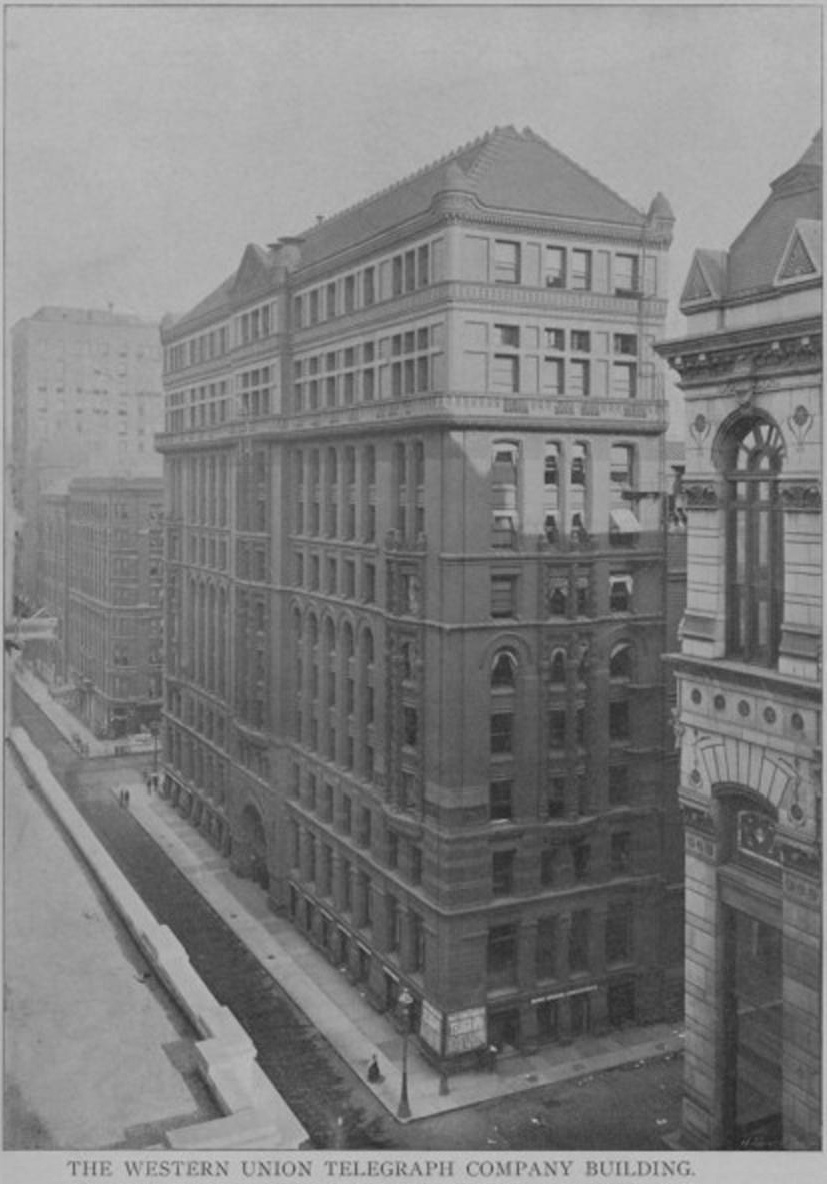
As the Western Union Building, with two floors added in 1892

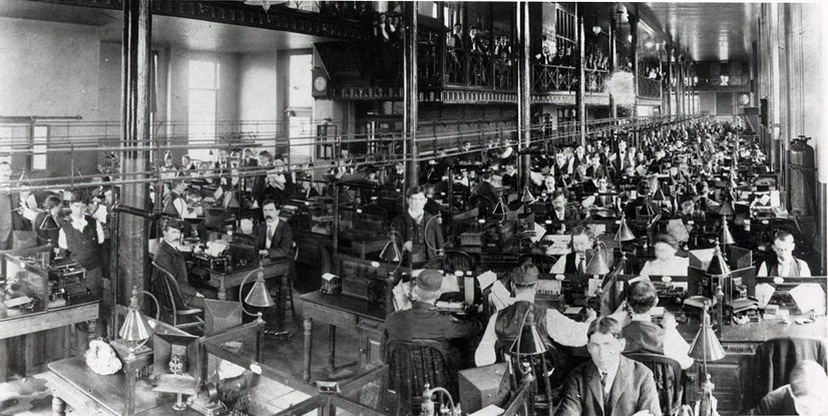
Interior of Western Union office, ninth floor - main operating room - 1901. The floor was left undivided as one 9,750-square-foot space so that the five hundred operators who worked on that level could perform their duties unimpeded by interior partitions.
