= Marriott at Key Center =

Skyscraper hotel in the United States

Coordinates: 41°30′4.5″N 81°41′41.2″W

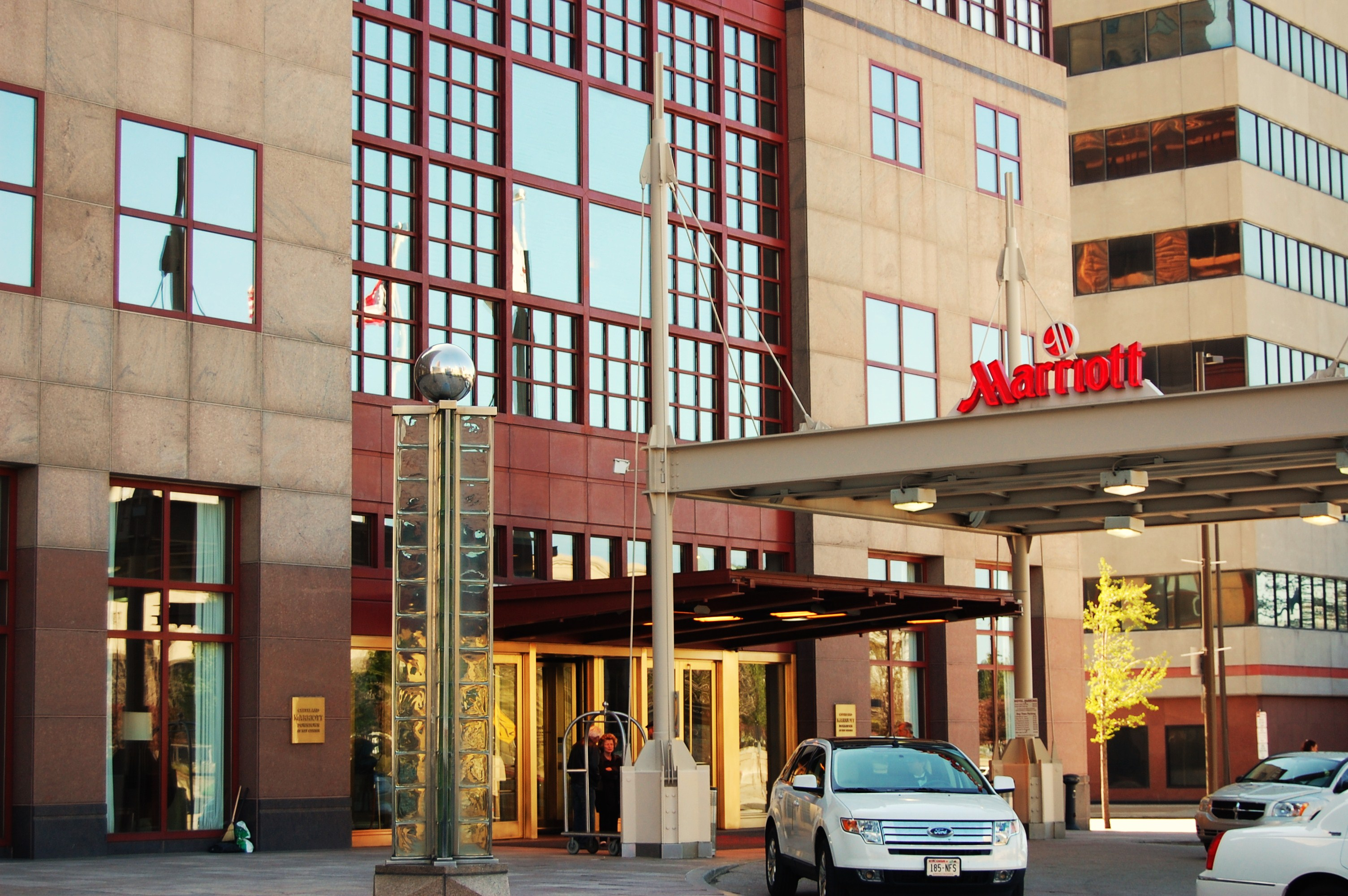
- Entrance facing Mall A
- Interactive map of the Marriott at Key Center area

General information
- Location: 127 Public Square, Cleveland, Ohio United States
- Opening: 1991
- Owner: Wells Real Estate Funds
- Operator: Marriott International, Inc.

Technical details
- Floor count: 25

Design and construction
- Architect: César Pelli
- Developer: Richard E. Jacobs Group

Other information
- Number of rooms: 385
- Number of suites: 15
- Number of restaurants: 3
- Parking: On-Site Parking

Website
- Home page

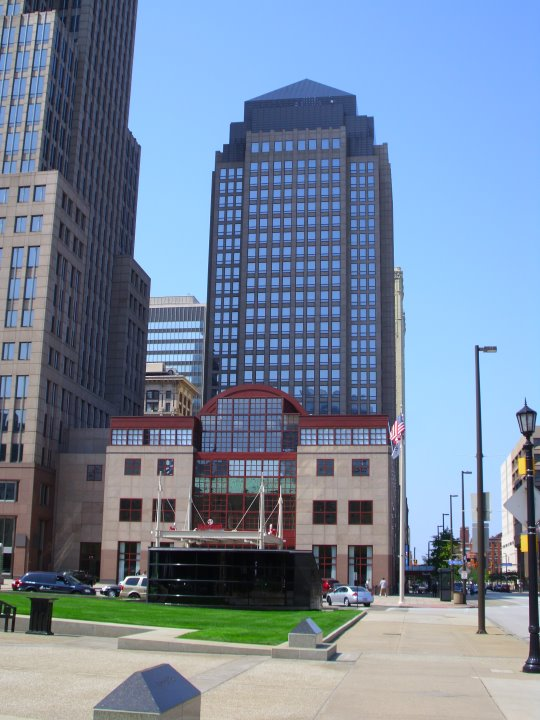
The Marriott at Key Center

The Marriott at Key Center is a skyscraper hotel in Cleveland, Ohio. The building rises 320 feet (98 m). It contains 28 floors, and was completed in 1991. The architect who designed the building was César Pelli, who also designed the neighboring Key Tower, the tallest building in the city and the state. The Marriott at Key Center closely resembles the façade of the Key Tower. These two buildings, together with the Society for Savings Building, comprise Key Center.

The Marriott at Key Center stands on the site formerly occupied by the Engineers Building, which was completed in 1910. This 14-story building had housed the Brotherhood of Locomotive Engineers, or BLE, labor union, but was demolished in 1989 to allow for the construction of Key Center.

In 2016, The Marriott Hotel lost its tallest hotel in Cleveland status to the brand new Hilton Cleveland Downtown Hotel in late 2015, when the HCDH rose 374 feet high, containing 32 floors, thereby eclipsing the Marriott by 4 floors. The Hilton almost bookends the shorter Marriott and sits across the street on the corner of Lakeside Avenue.

== See also ==
- List of tallest buildings in Cleveland
- Key Center
