= Laurel Road =

American online financial services company

- Formerly: Darien Rowayton Bank
- Company type: Public
- Industry: Financial services
- Founded: 2013 in Connecticut
- Headquarters: New York City, U.S.
- Parent: KeyBank

Laurel Road (formerly known as Darien Rowayton Bank) is an online financial services company headquartered in New York City. Laurel Road was initially founded as the national lending division of Darien Rowayton Bank (DRB) in 2013 and acquired by KeyBank in 2019. Laurel Road operates in all 50 states of the US.

The company reported that $9 billion in federal and private school loans had originated through its platform up to September 23, 2021.

== History ==
In 2006, Darien Rowayton Bank was founded in Connecticut, and in 2009, the company was acquired by Alcar LLC and a new management team was put in place. In 2013, DRB launched the DRB Student Loan for professionals with graduate and undergraduate degree to refinance and consolidate federal and private student loans. By February 2015, DRB expanded its national student loan refinancing program to include residents and fellows, enabling them to refinance their loans upon securing employment contracts. In 2017, DRB announced the rebranding of its national online lending division to Laurel Road combining the two entities and becoming Laurel Road Bank. In 2018, Laurel Road partnered with the American Medical Association.

In April 2019, KeyBank, one of the nation's largest bank-based financial services companies and a member of FDIC, acquired Laurel Road. The three bank branches in southeast Connecticut owned by Laurel Road were not included in this transaction. Consequently, Laurel Road shifted its base to Manhattan. In 2021, Laurel Road started a digital bank for physicians, nurses, and dentists called Laurel Road for Doctors, to help them with student debt. It also launched Laurel Road Checking.
