= Great Northern Hotel (Chicago) =

Historic hotel

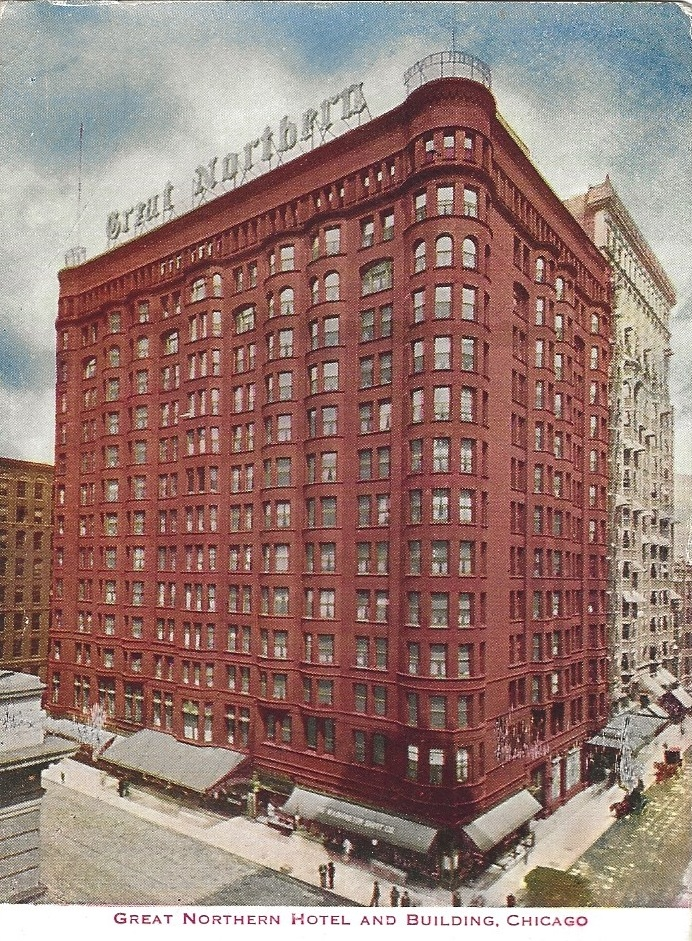
- Great Northern Hotel and Building, Chicago

- Location within Chicago metropolitan area
- 41.8788°N 87.6290°W
- Location: 267 S. Dearborn, Chicago, Illinois, US

History
- Built: 1892
- Demolished: 1940

Site notes
- Architect: Burnham and Root
- Owner: Alvin Hulbert

Great Northern Hotel was a historic hotel in Chicago's Loop area. The building also housed the Great Northern Theatre. It was located at the northeast corner of Jackson Boulevard and Dearborn Street in Chicago, Illinois. The building was designed by Burnham and Root. They created a new design, with an urban office block floor plan that was free of historical or European influences. The site is now occupied by the Dirksen Federal Building.

== History ==
The Great Northern Hotel opened in 1892 with 16-story, 500 rooms, 8 dining rooms, and 6 elevators. The cost of the building was $1,150,000. The building was made with a steel structure and was one of the first fireproof hotels in Chicago. The hotel was constructed by the architecture firm of D. H. Burnham and Company. They created a new design, with an urban office block floor plan that was free of historical or European influences. When the building was constructed in 1892, The Enquirer was located in the hotel.

The hotel was described as the "Chicago Hotel," but owner, Alvin Hulbert of Hulbert & Eden changed the name to the "Great Northern." The hotel was popular during the 1893 Chicago World's Fair. It was close to the World's Fair and Woolworth's Department Stores.

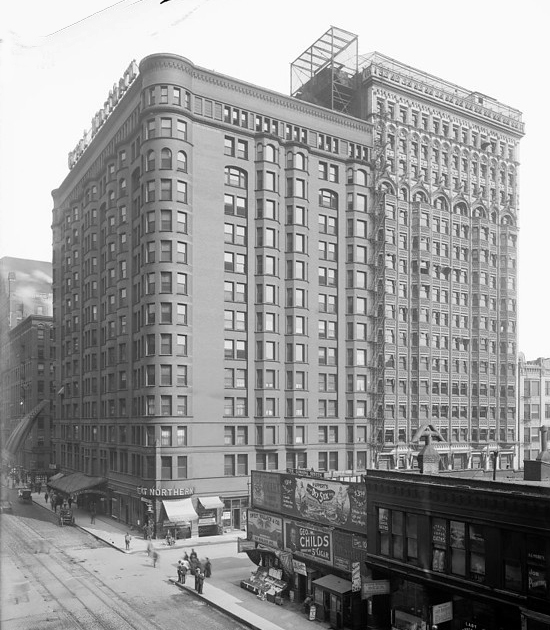
Great Northern Office and Theatre Building, ca.1900.

The Great Northern hotel was demolished in 1940 and replaced with a one story taxpayer. The Great Northern Office and Theatre Building, as well as other buildings, were demolished in 1961 to make way for the Dirksen Federal Building, built in 1964.
