= Key Tower =

Skyscraper in Cleveland, Ohio

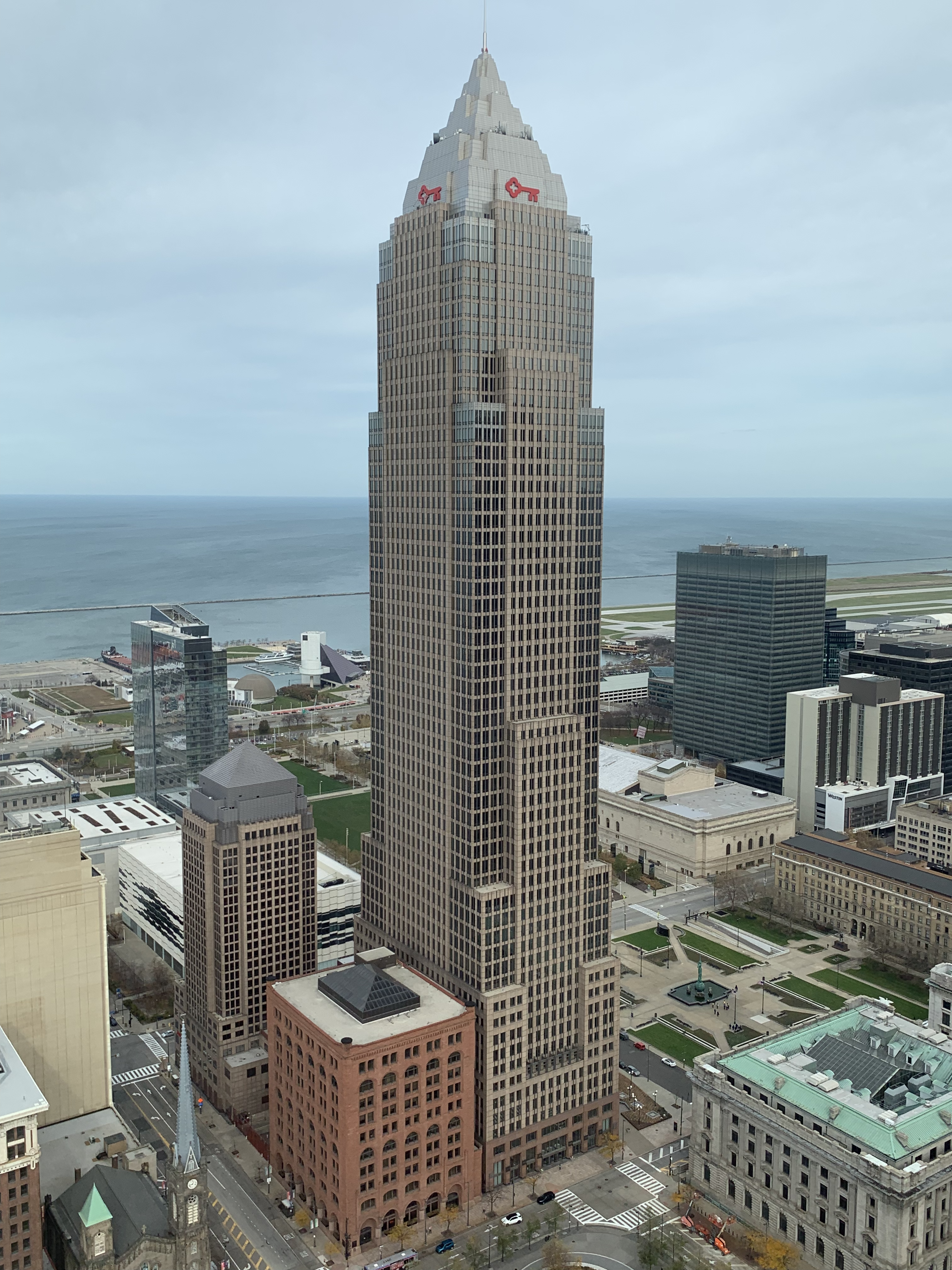
- Key Tower in 2022
- Interactive map of the Key Tower area

Record height
- Tallest in Ohio since 1991^{[I]}
- Preceded by: Terminal Tower

General information
- Status: Completed
- Type: Office
- Location: 127 Public Square; Cleveland, Ohio
- Coordinates: 41°30′04″N 81°41′37″W
- Construction started: October 17, 1988
- Completed: 1991
- Opening: January 1992
- Owner: The Millennia Companies

Height
- Architectural: 947 feet (289 m)
- Roof: 888 feet (271 m)

Technical details
- Floor count: 57
- Floor area: 1,249,981 square feet (116,127.0 m^{2})

Design and construction
- Architect: Cesar Pelli
- Developer: Richard E. Jacobs Group
- Structural engineer: Skilling Ward Magnusson Barkshire

Website
- keytowerohio.com

Key Tower (formerly known as Society Center) is a 57 story skyscraper on Public Square in downtown Cleveland, Ohio. Designed by architect César Pelli and completed in 1991, the 947-foot (289 m) building is the tallest in the state of Ohio, the 42nd-tallest in the United States, and the 165th-tallest in the world. Visible from up to 20 miles (32 km) away, the tower contains about 1.5 million square feet (139,355 m²) of office space.

Key Tower's anchor tenant is KeyCorp, a major regional financial services firm. In 2014 the law firm of BakerHostetler announced that it would move its headquarters to the building, taking up several floors being vacated by KeyCorp. The international law firm Squire Patton Boggs is headquartered here and a major tenant. It is also headquarters to Dan T. Moore Companies, located on the 27th floor. Key Tower is connected to the Marriott at Key Center, built in conjunction with the tower, and the older Society for Savings Building. It was the tallest building between New York City and Chicago until 2007, and is the tallest building in the Midwest United States outside of Chicago.

In October 2008, Wells Real Estate Funds purchased Key Center, including Key Tower, Marriott at Key Center, Society for Savings Building, and the underground Memorial Plaza Garage. Key Tower was subsequently acquired by The Millennia Companies in 2017 for $267.5 million.

== History ==
It was originally built as the Society Center and was the headquarters for Cleveland-based Society Corporation bank. Society had recently acquired AmeriTrust and canceled AmeriTrust's plans for an even taller (61-story) building on Public Square. Its opening ended the Terminal Tower's 60-year reign as the tallest building in Ohio.

It was renamed Key Tower after Society merged with KeyCorp and took the KeyCorp name. Indeed, it was decided to make Cleveland the headquarters for the new KeyCorp because it was felt the then-Society Center was more commensurate with the merged bank's status as a major bank. Pelli originally intended its design for the Norwest Center in Minneapolis, but a late change to the site led to Pelli designing a new tower for it.

Key Tower was developed by the Richard E. Jacobs Group.

When Society Center was completed in 1991 by Turner Construction, it became the tallest building between Chicago and New York City. The 975-foot (297 m) Comcast Center in Philadelphia assumed this distinction in 2007. The Chamber of Commerce Building stood on the tower's site from 1898 to 1955.

F-111, James Rosenquist's large pop art painting, hung in the tower's lobby until building owner Richard Jacobs sold it to the Museum of Modern Art in 1996. He replaced it in 1998 with Songs for Sale, a mural by artist David Salle. In October 2005, Key Bank installed four 15-foot (4.6 m) long illuminated logos at the base of the tower's crowning pyramid. Each sign weighs 1,500 pounds (680 kg).

A smaller-scale building was proposed by Pelli to be built in Hartford, Connecticut, during the late 1980s, but the plan was ultimately canceled.

== See also ==
- List of tallest buildings by U.S. state
- List of tallest buildings in Cleveland
- List of tallest buildings in the United States
