= CrossCountry Mortgage =

American nonbank retail mortgage lender

- Type: Private
- Industry: Mortgage lending Financial services
- Founded: 2003; 23 years ago
- Founder: Ron Leonhardt
- Headquarters: Cleveland, Ohio, United States
- Area served: United States
- Key people: Ron Leonhardt (CEO)
- Products: Residential mortgage loans
- Services: Loan origination, servicing, non-QM investments
- Subsidiaries: Valere Financial; CrossCountry Capital; RoundPoint Mortgage Servicing LLC
- Website: ccm.com

CrossCountry Mortgage (CCM) is a privately owned nonbank retail mortgage lender headquartered in Cleveland, Ohio. It is among the largest retail mortgage lenders in the United States by loan volume.

== History ==
CrossCountry Mortgage was founded in Cleveland in 2003 by Ron Leonhardt as a mortgage brokerage. In 2012, it became an approved seller and servicer for Fannie Mae, Freddie Mac, and Ginnie Mae and expanded its offerings to include conventional, jumbo, FHA, VA, and USDA loans.

CCM expanded through several acquisitions beginning in the late 2010s. In October 2018, Chicago-based bemortgage, a division of Bridgeview Bank Group, became a division of CCM. In March 2019, it acquired Chicago-based PERL Mortgage, which operated 60 branches in 18 states. Later that year, it acquired GMH Mortgage.

In May 2020, CCM acquired the assets of First Choice Loan Services, a New Jersey-based residential mortgage lender that operated the mortgage program for Costco members. Costco discontinued the program in 2022.

In January 2021, the Ohio Tax Credit Authority approved an eight-year job-creation tax credit connected to CCM's planned relocation from Brecksville to Cleveland. The company broke ground in June 2021 on a $46 million, 168,000-square-foot corporate campus in Cleveland's Superior Arts District.

In July 2021, CCM entered a long-term partnership with the Cleveland Browns that included naming rights to the team's training and administrative complex in Berea, renamed the CrossCountry Mortgage Campus.

In November 2021, funds managed by Ares Management and the Caisse de dépôt et placement du Québec led a $400 million loan facility for CCM. In April 2022, it acquired LendUS, an Alamo, California-based retail lender that had originated approximately $7 billion in loans during 2021 through about 350 loan officers and 100 branches. Later in 2022, CrossCountry acquired the retail lending business of Atlanta-based Angel Oak Home Loans.

In January 2024, CCM completed its acquisition of AmCap Home Loans, a privately held retail lender headquartered in Houston and expanded its presence in Texas.

In September 2025, CrossCountry HoldCo expanded its asset-management arm, CrossCountry Capital, through partnerships with an Ares Alternative Credit fund and Hildene Capital Management. The partnerships secured more than $1 billion in equity commitments for additional non-qualified mortgage investments.

In March 2026, CCM agreed to acquire Summit Funding, a Sacramento-based mortgage banker and servicer founded in 1995. Later that month, it entered a definitive agreement to acquire Two Harbors Investment Corp., a real estate investment trust whose subsidiary, RoundPoint Mortgage Servicing, is a major servicer of conventional mortgages. Two Harbors shareholders approved the merger in July 2026.

CCM is also the sponsor of CrossCountry Mortgage Forest Home, which is expected to open in 2026.

== Operations ==
CrossCountry Mortgage is licensed in all 50 states, the District of Columbia, and Puerto Rico and operates more than 1,000 branches. It is a direct lender and an approved seller and servicer for Fannie Mae, Freddie Mac, and Ginnie Mae. Its third-party origination and mortgage investment division operates under the Valere Financial name.

CrossCountry Capital, established in 2022, operates a non-agency securitization platform under the CROSS shelf and manages more than $7 billion in loans in partnership with Hildene Capital Management.
