= Rand McNally Building =

Former skyscraper in Chicago, Illinois

Coordinates: 41.8792°N 87.6330°W

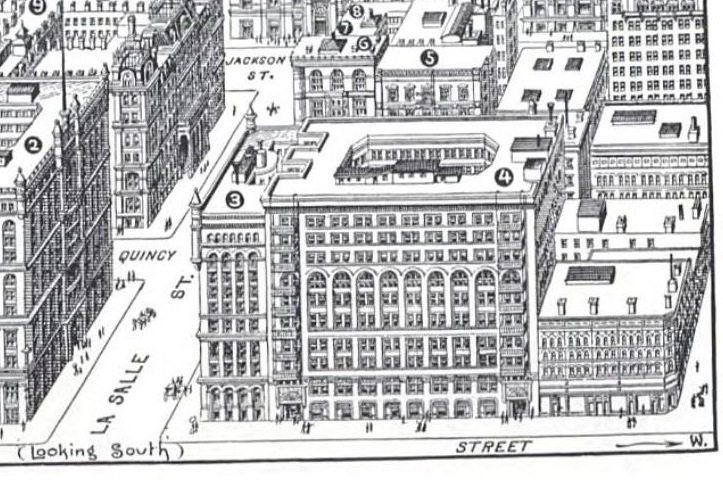
- Rand McNally Building (center, #4) as seen in a Rand McNally "bird's eye" illustration, 1890s
- Interactive map of the Rand McNally Building area

General information
- Architectural style: neoclassical
- Location: Chicago, 160–174 Adams Street
- Opened: 1889
- Demolished: 1911

Design and construction
- Architect: Burnham and Root

The Rand McNally Building was an early skyscraper at 160–174 Adams Street in Chicago, Illinois, built in 1889 and demolished in 1911. Designed by Burnham and Root, it was the world's first all-steel framed skyscraper.

== History ==
The building was located at 160–174 Adams Street (on the south side between LaSalle and Wells) and also fronted #105–#119 on the backside (Quincy Street). It was erected in 1889 at a cost of $1 million. It was 45 m (148 ft) tall, had 10 stories, 16 stores, and 300 offices, but the main tenant was Rand, McNally & Co., printers and publishers, with 900 employees. The general offices of the Chicago, Milwaukee & St. Paul Railway were located here on the 2nd and 3rd floors, as were the headquarters of the World's Columbian Exposition, on the 4th and 5th. The Long Distance Telephone Company (Quincy Street side) allowed patrons the ability to telephone New York City, a novelty at the time.

It was demolished in 1911 and a larger building of that era still stands on the site. For many years, it housed the headquarters of the City National Bank & Trust Company.

== See also ==
- Early skyscrapers
