= Andover College (Maine) =

Coordinates: 43°38′20″N 70°19′26″W

Andover College in South Portland, Maine began as the Andover Institute of Business in Portland in 1967; the name was changed to Andover College in 1977. The college was given accreditation from the New England Association of Schools and Colleges (NEASC) in 1998.

== History ==
Andover College also had a campus in Lewiston, started in 2003. The college was bought by the Kaplan Higher Education Corporation (KHE) in 2005 and joined the Kaplan Higher Education Campuses (KHEC) division. In 2010 the name was changed to Kaplan University, South Portland Campus.

== Notable alumni ==
- Mark Bryant (1983), Maine state legislator
