= Burnham and Root =

Former American architecture firm

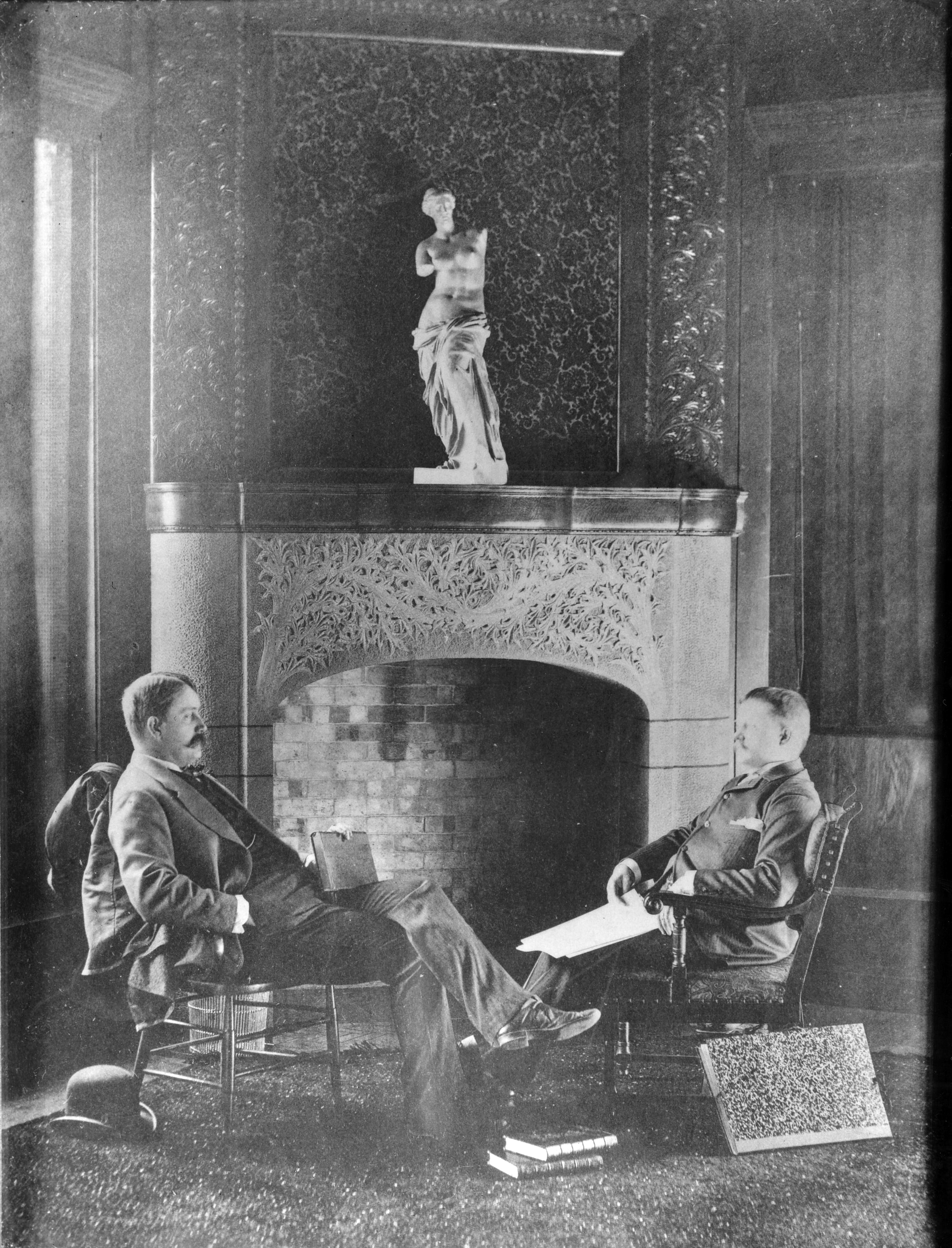
Daniel H. Burnham and John W. Root, circa 1890

Burnham and Root was one of Chicago's most famous architectural companies of the nineteenth century. It was established by Daniel Hudson Burnham and John Wellborn Root.

During their eighteen years of partnership, Burnham and Root designed and built residential and commercial buildings. Their success was crowned with the coordination of the World's Columbian Exposition (World's Fair) in 1893. The two men met when they worked as apprentice draftsmen in the offices of Drake, Carter, and Wight in 1872. A year later they established their own architecture office and began work by building private residences for the wealthy elite of Chicago's meat industry. Both of them married into wealthy families which allowed them to establish a basis for their business. "Daniel Hudson Burnham was one of the handsomest men I ever saw," said Paul Starrett who joined Burnham and Root in 1888 (later he designed the Empire State Building). "It was easy to see how he got commissions. His very bearing and looks were half the battle". While Burnham was the pragmatic designer and impressive salesperson, Root became the creative genius of the company. When Burnham and Root were together, one woman said "I used always to think of some big strong tree with lightning playing around it". Louis Sullivan, the famous architect, called Burnham "a colossal merchandiser" obsessed with building the biggest and costliest structures of the city.

The most significant buildings designed by Burnham and Root were built in the late 1880s and early 1890s. That is when Root's designs actually paved the way for modern day skyscrapers. Until then, buildings relied on exterior masonry for support, limiting their height to 12 stories. The invention of steel support beams gave him the possibility to build higher and to add more windows. The Rand McNally Building, completed in 1890, was the first ever steel-framed skyscraper in the world. Another characteristic of his designs that revolutionized modern architecture is his invention of the urban office block floor plan as we know it. As commissions multiplied, Burnham and Root had the opportunity to experiment and refine their style to create an entirely new aesthetic that was free of historical or European influences. Such buildings as the Great Northern hotel (1892), the Argyle and the Pickwick demonstrate Root's singular style.

In 1890 Chicago won the competition to host the (1892) World’s Columbian Exposition, celebrating the 400th anniversary of Christopher Columbus’ discovery of America. John Root was given the important task of coordinating the event. After deciding on the location of the Fair and doing the preliminary plans of the site, he decided that "No one architect should design these buildings, but a number of the best architects in the United States, all working together as one commission." Hence, the greatest architects of the time were invited to participate in the design of the World's Columbian Exposition. Root died in 1891, leaving his greatest project incomplete. Daniel Burnham, despite only having practical experience and no formal training in the field of architecture, was then given the responsibility to finish coordinating the fair. When it opened for six months, from June to November 1893, it was a complete success. The Exposition was home to many innovations, among which the first Ferris wheel, which was the result of a challenge set out by Burnham to design "a structure of comparable ingenuity and novelty."

Following his success and the loss of his business partner, Burnham continued to operate under the name D. H. Burnham and Co. The projects begun by Root were completed, including the Masonic Temple in 1892, which was for a short period the tallest building in the world at 22 stories. It is then that Burnham's architectural talent became the driving force of the business, resulting in such iconic buildings such as the Flatiron Building in New York City. Burnham was unable to maintain the architectural progress made by Root, but he demonstrated great versatility in his style. Burnham died in 1912 while vacationing in Germany.

== Selected Burnham and Root buildings ==
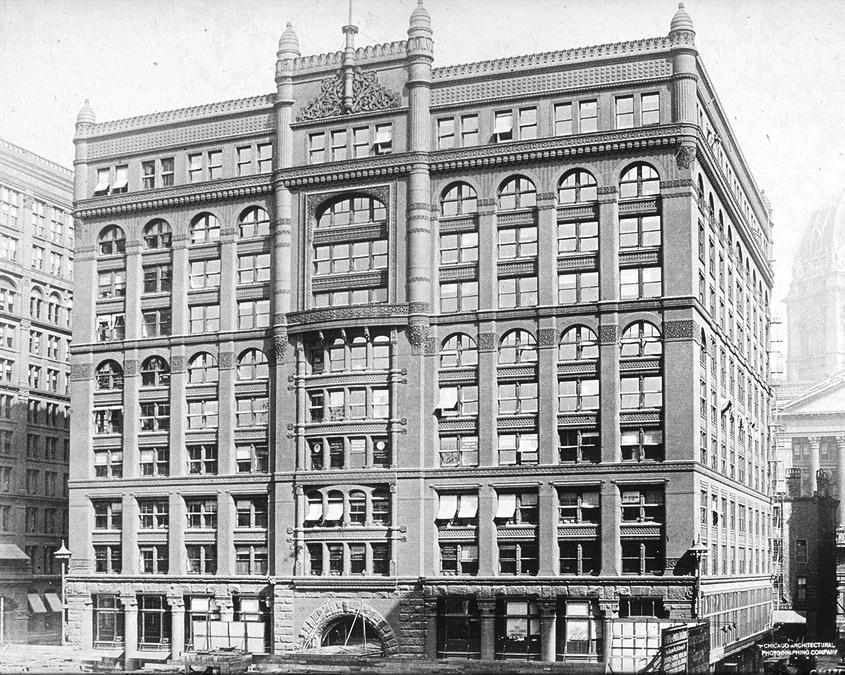
Rookery Building, 1891

- Old Chronicle Building (San Francisco, CA)
- Montezuma Castle (hotel)
- Rookery Building
- Heyworth Building
- Luzon Building
- Montauk Building
- Masonic Temple (Chicago, Illinois)
- Monadnock Building
- Pearsons Hall of Science
- Phoenix (Phenix) Building, Chicago, IL
- Rand McNally Building (1889, the first all-steel framed skyscraper)
- Sydney Kent House
- Great Northern Hotel, Chicago (1892)
- Equitable Building (Atlanta 1892)
- Emmanuel United Methodist Church (Evanston, IL 1890)
