= Economy of Ohio =

Statistics
- GDP: $834.26 billion (1st quarter 2025)
- Population below national poverty line: 15.4%
- Gini coefficient: 0.4594
- Labor force: 5,883,960
- Unemployment: 4.2%

Public finance
- Revenue: $27.3 billion
- Spending: $31 billion

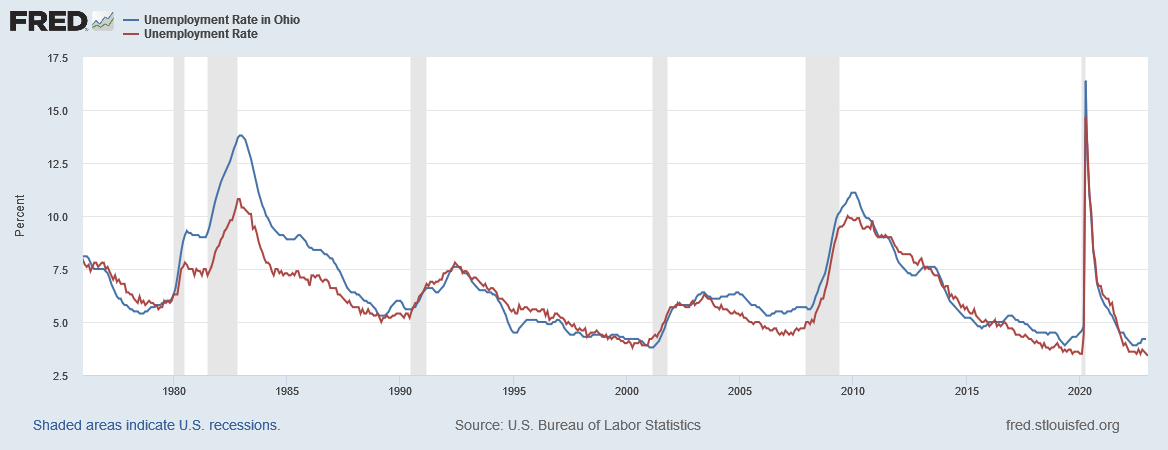
Ohio unemployment rate, 1976–2022 US unemployment rate

The economy of Ohio nominally would be the 20th largest global economy (behind Turkey and ahead of Switzerland), according to the World Bank, as of 2022. The state had a GDP of $822.67 billion in 2022, which is 3.23% of the United States total, ranking 7th in the nation behind Pennsylvania and ahead of Georgia.

Ohio is commonly noted as the Nation's Industrial Capital, dating to its roots in the Rust Belt and Ohio's present-day intelligence and scientific dominance. The year ending July 2011 saw the state ranked fourth in the nation in job creation behind Texas, California, and New York. By 2016 the state wasn't in the top 10 for job growth, but between 2017 and 2018 the state saw an increase in job creation of 44,600.

After California and Texas, Ohio is the third largest U.S. manufacturing state, with total output in 2017 approaching $108 billion. Home to more than 12,000 manufacturers, 12.6% of the Ohio work force is dedicated to manufacturing.

Ohio is considered a center of science and industry, with museums dedicated to such in Columbus, COSI, the Great Lakes Science Center in Cleveland, the Imagination Station in Toledo, and the Boonshoft Museum of Discovery in Dayton. The state includes many historically strong industries, such as banking and insurance, which accounts for 8% of the gross state product, motor vehicle manufacturing, research and development, and steel production, accounting for 14-17% of the nation's raw output. More traditional industries include agriculture, employing one out of seven Ohioans, and new and developing sectors include bioscience, green, information, and food processing industries. Ohio is the biggest manufacturer of plastics and rubber in the country, has the largest bioscience sector in the Midwest, and ranked fourth in the country for green economic growth through 2007.

The state is recognized internationally as the "Fuel Cell Corridor", while Toledo is recognized as a national solar center, Cleveland a regenerative medicine research hub, Dayton an aerospace and defense hub, Columbus a technological research and development hub, and Cincinnati a mercantile hub.

Wal-Mart is the largest private sector employer in Ohio with approximately 50,500 employees in 2017. The largest Ohio employer with headquarters in Ohio is the Cleveland Clinic, with approximately 49,050 employees and headquarters in Cleveland. The largest employer at a single location in Ohio is Wright Patterson Air Force Base in Dayton. 70% of the nation's electrometallurgical ferroalloy manufacturing employees are located in Ohio.

== Overview ==
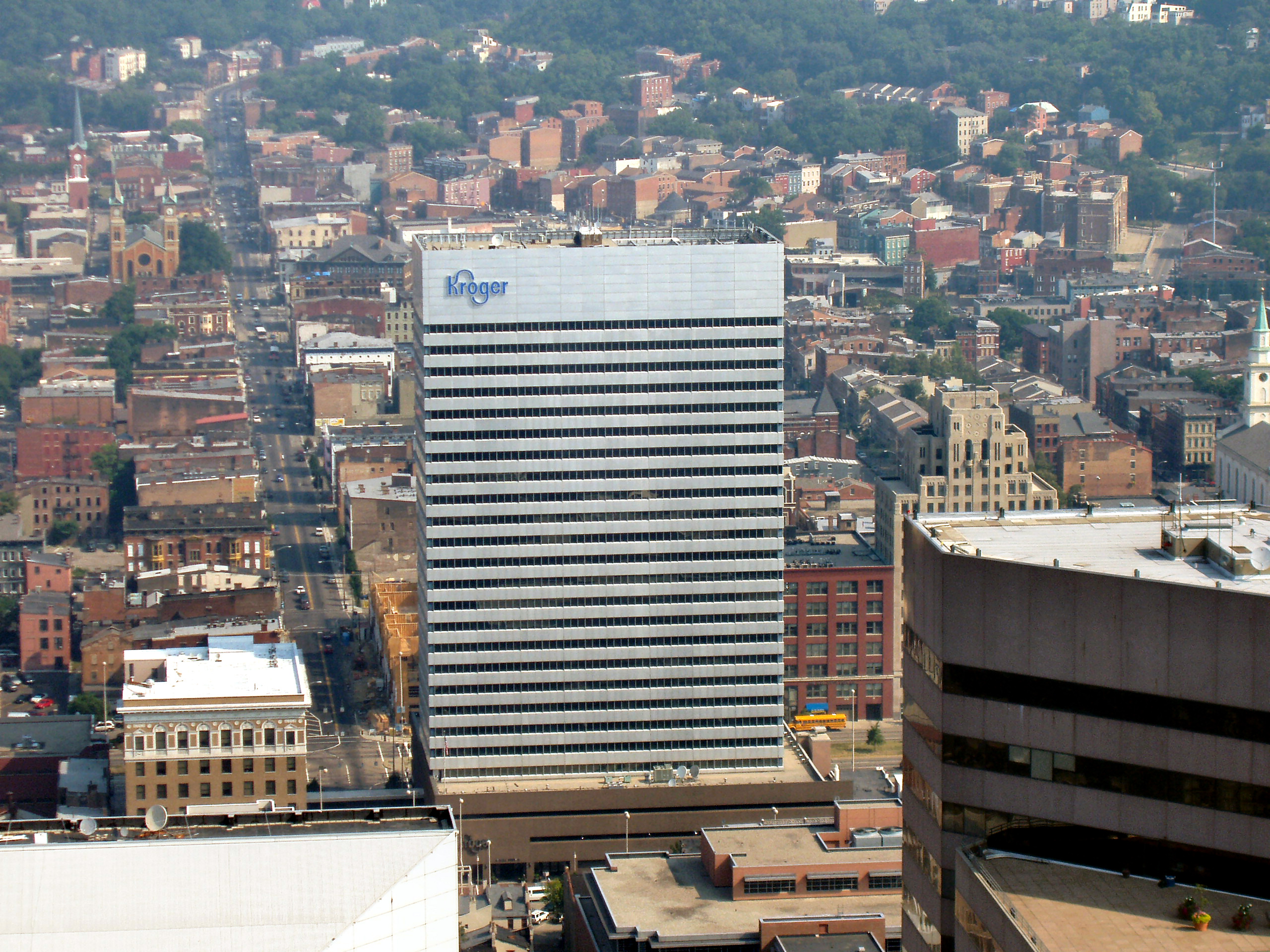
Kroger, a supermarket company based in Cincinnati, is the largest employer of those companies headquartered in the state.

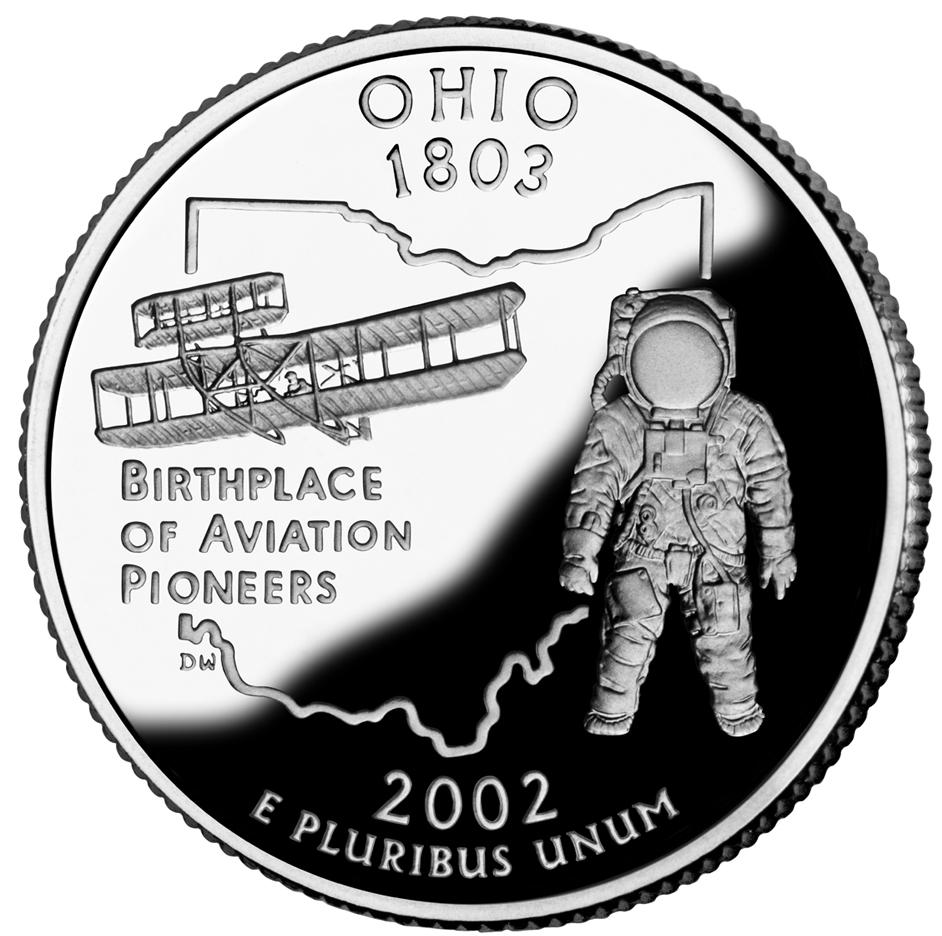
Ohio's state quarter lays claim to the "Birthplace of Aviation Pioneers," in which Ohio's aerospace and defense industry is still economically strong.

The economy of Ohio nominally would be the 25th-largest global economy behind Sweden and ahead of Nigeria according to the 2013 World Bank projections, and the 24th-largest global economy behind Sweden and ahead of Norway according to the 2013 International Monetary Fund projections. According to the Bureau of Economic Analysis, the state had a projected GDP of $526.1 billion in 2013, up from $517.1 billion in 2012, and up from $501.3 billion in 2011.

A 2014 report by the Quantitative Economics and Statistics Practices (QUEST) of Ernst & Young in conjunction with the Council On State Taxation (COST), ranks Ohio third in the nation for friendliest tax environment. The study, entitled "Competitiveness of state and local business taxes on new investment," provides a state-by-state comparison of tax liabilities. The Top 5 states ranked with the lowest effective tax rate on new investment are: (1) Maine (3.0%), (2) Oregon (3.8%), (3) Ohio (4.4%), (4) Wisconsin (4.5%), and (5) Illinois (4.6%). In 2013, Ohio was ranked in the Top 10 among states with the best business climate by Site Selection magazine, based on a business-activity database. The state was edged out by Texas and Nebraska for the 2013 Governor's Cup award from the magazine, based on business growth and economic development. Ohio was ranked No. 11 by the council for best friendly-policy states according to their Small Business Survival Index 2009. The Directorship's Boardroom Guide ranked the state #13 overall for best business climate and #7 for best litigation climate. Forbes ranked it #8 for best regulatory environment in 2009. Ohio was also ranked No. 8 by U.S. News & World Report in 2008 for best high schools. Overall, the state's schools were ranked No. 5 in the nation in 2010. However, by 2016 the state's high school rankings had slipped to #11 according to U.S. News & World Report, and #22 overall in quality by Education Week in 2017. The year ending July 2011 saw the state being ranked fourth in the nation in job creation behind Texas, California, and New York. By 2016, the state wasn't ranked within the top 10 for job growth, and between 2015 and 2016, the state saw a decrease in job creation of 38,800. Since February 2010, the state was 2.5% below the national average.

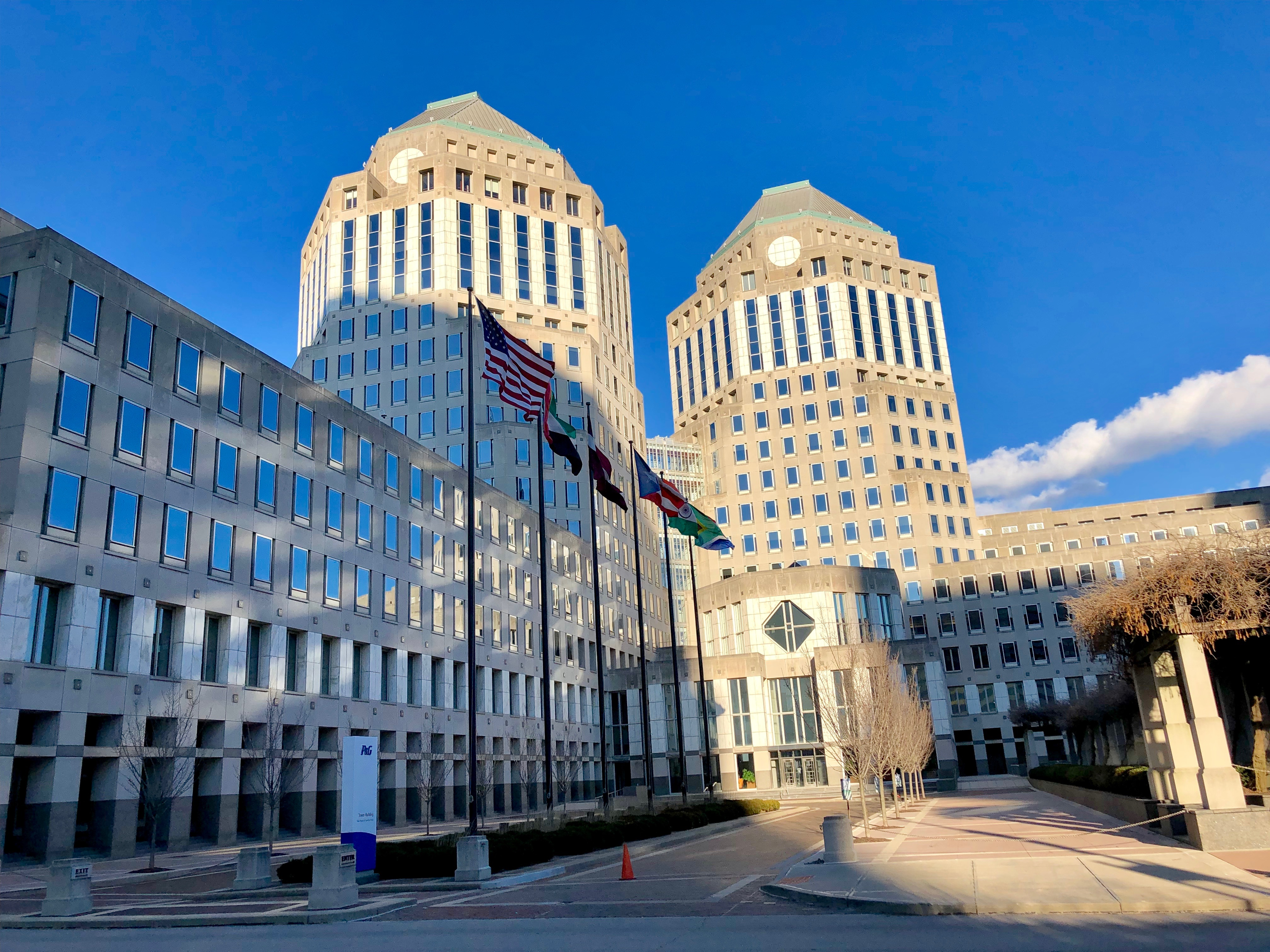
Procter & Gamble headquarters in Cincinnati

Ohio's private sector consists of 921,000 employers, which hire at least 50.4% of the state's non-farm private workforce. The state has a developing technology sector, and it is home to over 28,000 employers employing roughly 820,000 people; its rate of technology operations is 14% higher than the US average. Between 2006 and 2014, Ohio's employment is expected to grow by 290,700 jobs, or approximately 5.0%. Personal income grew an average of 3.1% in 2008. About 659,900 people are employed in the state's manufacturing sector. Major manufacturing employers in the state include AK Steel, Timken, and Honda. In 2007, foreign-based companies employed 229,500 of Ohio's citizens, led by Japan, the United Kingdom, Germany, France, and Switzerland.

Ohio's exports constituted 3.2% of total U.S. exports in 2009, with top destinations being Canada at $14.2 billion, followed by Mexico, China, the United Kingdom, Greece, Brazil, Japan, Germany, France, and Australia. In 2009, the state was ranked as the nation's seventh-largest exporter with $34.1 billion. About 092 companies exported in 2009, with transportation equipment accounting for $9.9 billion, machinery $4.9 billion, chemicals $4.4 billion, and computer and electronics products $2.4 billion.

As of 2020, Ohio was ranked No. 5 in the nation for Fortune 500 companies, with 27, including Cardinal Health (#16), Marathon Petroleum (#22), Kroger (#23), Procter & Gamble (#50), Nationwide Insurance (#74), Progressive Insurance (#86), Sherwin-Williams (#180), Goodyear Tire and Rubber (#216), L Brands (#248), Fifth Third Bank (#325), Dana (#367) and Owens Corning (#431).

== Major employers ==
The following is a list of the top ten employers with headquarters in Ohio, as of January 2023.

Rank	Employer	Number of Ohio employees	Headquarters location	Sector
1	Cleveland Clinic Foundation	56,986	Cleveland	Health
2	Kroger	44,077	Cincinnati	Retail: food stores
3	Ohio State University and Medical Center	35,656	Columbus	Education and health
4	Wright Patterson Air Force Base	28,000	Dayton	Government: Air Force base
5	University Hospitals Health System	30,891	Cleveland	Health
6	Mercy Health Partners	30,510	Cincinnati	Health
7	OhioHealth	30,488	Columbus	Health
8	ProMedica	18,712	Toledo	Health
9	Cincinnati Children's Hospital Medical Center	17,204	Cincinnati	Health
10	Kettering Health	14,413	Dayton	Health

The following is a list of the top Ohioan employers not headquartered in Ohio, as of January 2023.

Rank	Employer	Number of Ohio employees	Headquarters location	Sector
1	Wal-Mart	55,262	Bentonville, Arkansas	Retail: general merchandise
2	Amazon	45,000	Seattle, Washington	Retail: general merchandise
3	JP Morgan Chase	20,228	New York, New York	Finance: bank
4	Giant Eagle	17,400	Pittsburgh, Pennsylvania	Retail: food stores
5	FedEx	15,250	Memphis, Tennessee	Transportation: air delivery
6	United Parcel Service	15,236	Atlanta, Georgia	Transportation: air delivery
7	Lowe's Companies	14,400	Mooresville, North Carolina	Retail: home improvement
8	Honda Motor Company	14,400	Tokyo, Japan	Manufacture: motor vehicles
9	The Home Depot	12,600	Atlanta, Georgia	Retail: home improvement
10	Target	12,410	Minneapolis, Minnesota	Retail: department stores

== Industries ==
=== Aerospace and defense ===
Dayton is designated as the state's aerospace hub due to its high concentration of aerospace and aviation technology. In 2009, Governor Ted Strickland designated Dayton as Ohio's aerospace innovation hub, the first such technology hub in the state. Aircraft engine manufacturing accounts for nearly 75% of Ohio's aerospace and defense industry workforce.

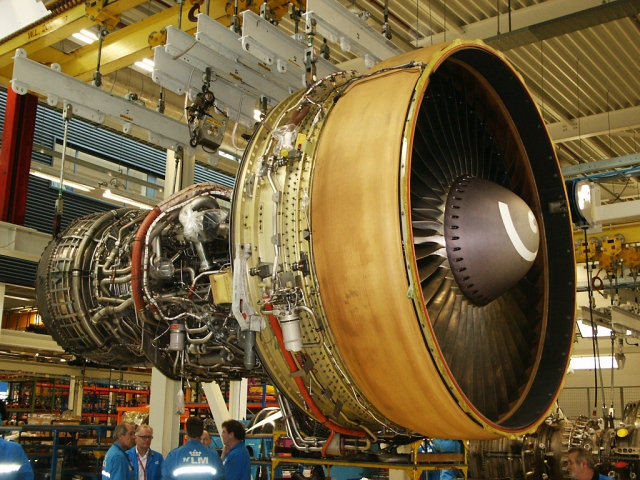
GE Aerospace, headquartered in Evendale, is a major manufacturer of aircraft engines. In 2010, EPISCENTER, a new R&D center for the corporation to be located in Dayton, was announced by the Third Frontier program. Aircraft engine manufacturing accounts for nearly 75% of Ohio's aerospace and defense industry workforce.

The aerospace and defense industry employs 16,000 Ohioans. Employment has been increasing after 2003, despite an overall decrease in employment since the industry's peak at 37,000 employees in 1990. In 2005, Ohio ranked fifth among US states in the production of aerospace products and parts, and eighth in the number of aerospace industry workers. Recently the states' employees have ranked No. 1 in value produced per worker. Ohioan workers in the aerospace industry made an annual average salary of $75,765 in 2005, compared to $48,208 in for workers in the manufacturing sector generally. Nearly 75% of the state's aerospace and defense employees work in the aircraft engine manufacturing sub-sector; only Connecticut has larger aircraft engine workforce.

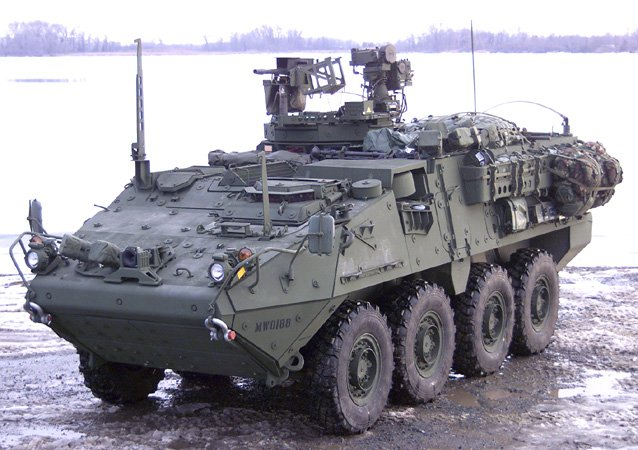
Weapon systems are integrated onto the M1131 fire support vehicle, or Stryker FSV, at the Joint Systems Manufacturing Center in Lima.

Notable aerospace and defense companies in Ohio include GE Aerospace, Timken, Goodrich Corporation, GE Honda Aero Engines, CFM International, and Aircraft Braking Systems. France-based CIRCOR Aerospace, Inc., which develops systems for aerospace fluid control, has a commercial unit located in the state. Boeing's Central Ohio Aerospace and Technology Center in Heath is a venture amongst five of the top 10 U.S. defense contractors, including Atlantic Inertial Systems, Honeywell, Kearfott, Northrop Grumman, L3 Communications, and Raytheon, which is also the headquarters of the Air Force Metrology and Calibration Program Office. RTI International Metals's location in Niles produces titanium used in every France-based Airbus aircraft. RTI was originally headquartered in Niles before moving to Pittsburgh in the 21st century, while Airbus has invested $4.3 billion in the state. Makino's Titanium Research and Development Center is located in Mason. Nextant Aerospace has manufacturing facilities at the Cuyahoga County Airport.

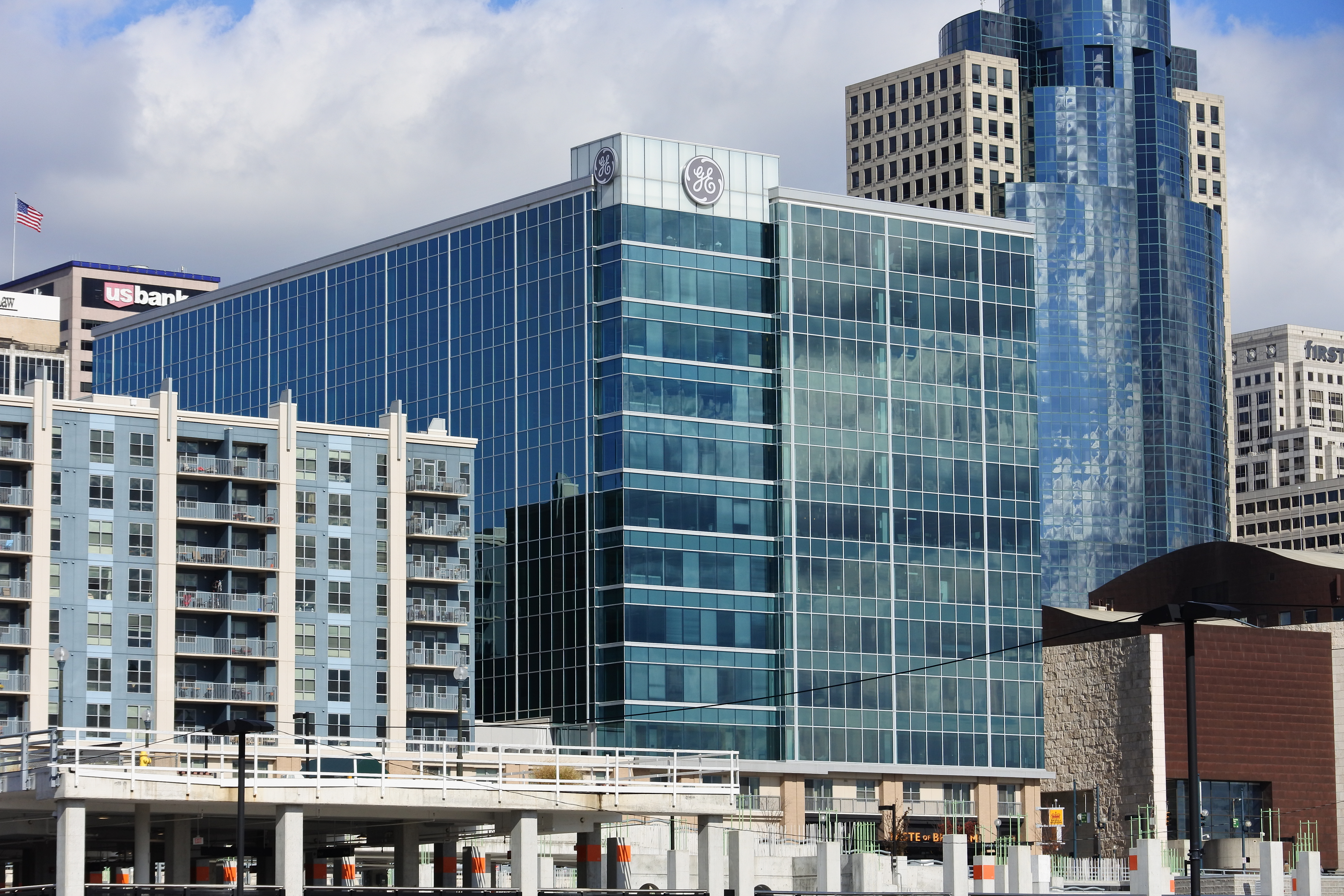
General Electric's Global Operations Center is headquartered in Downtown Cincinnati.

Defense systems play a smaller role in the industry. Ohio corporations were awarded around $5.5 billion of United States Department of Defense procurements. Notable defense contractors include Goodyear Tire and Rubber Company in Akron, Lockheed Martin in Akron, which won a contract to develop a space-ship in 2003 and produces the vertical launch ASROC missile, and Armor Holdings Aerospace and Defense Group in Fairfield. United Kingdom-based BAE Systems has a large facility in West Chester producing armored vehicles, armor kits, and ballistic glass.

The Joint Systems Manufacturing Center in Lima, in cooperation with General Dynamics, assembles armored combat vehicles, including the Expeditionary Fighting Vehicle and M1A2 Abrams tank. Columbus-based Zyvex Performance Materials develops the Piranha Unmanned Surface Vessel. Gravitational Energy Corporation, located in Cuyahoga Falls, proliferates Gravity Assisted Power (GAP) machines in cooperation with DriPowder, LLC to the military.

The United States Department of Defense currently maintains a large Supply Center in Whitehall, a suburb of Columbus.

Wright-Patterson Air Force Base, located in Dayton, and partially named for the Wright Brothers from Ohio who are credited with inventing the airplane, employs 27,400 residents. The Air Force estimates that Wright-Patterson's annual economic impact on the Dayton region is $5.1 billion.

=== Bioscience ===
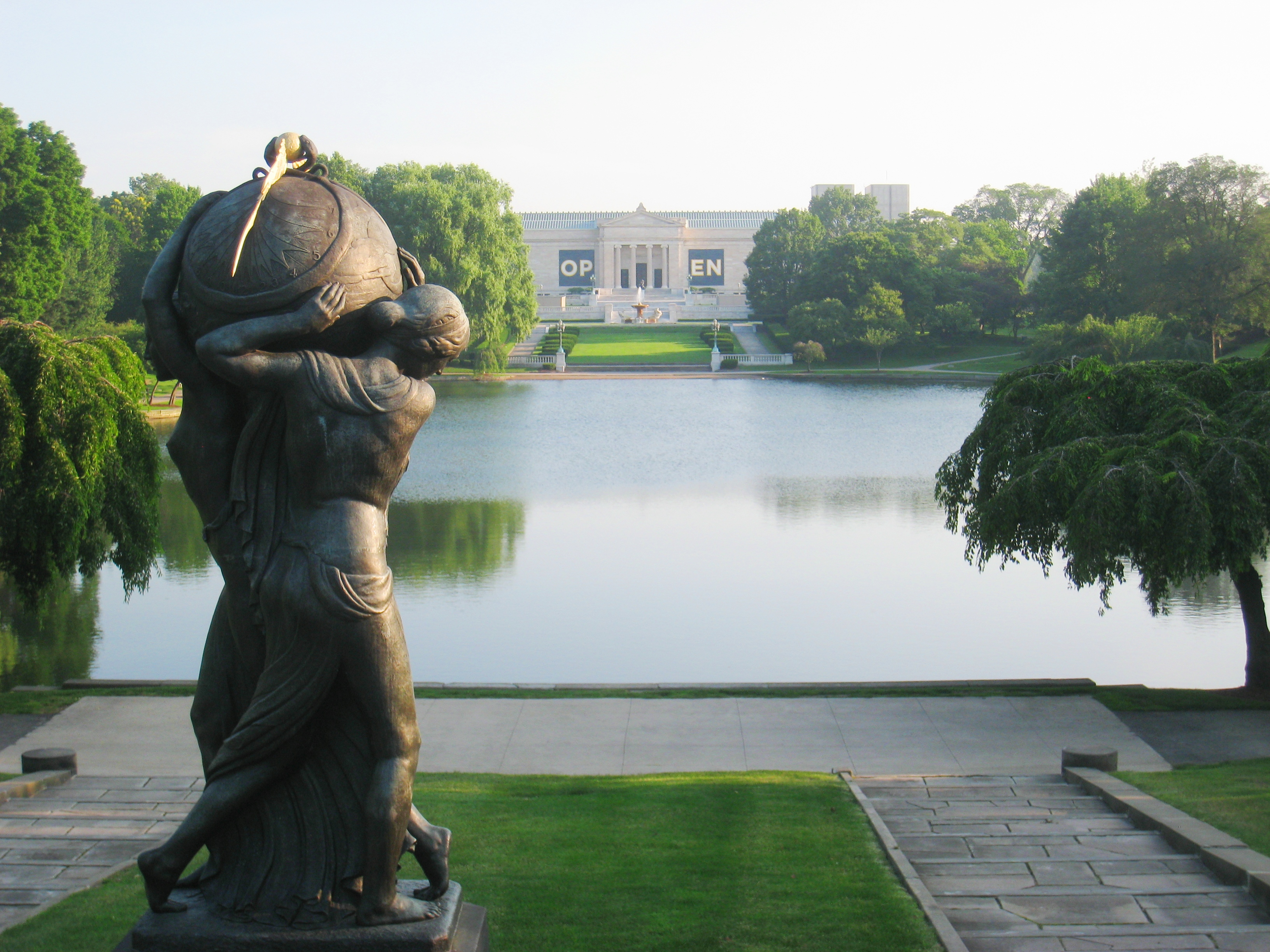
Wade Lagoon in University Circle, home to the Case Medical Center and neighboring Cleveland Clinic, which is set to begin human clinical trials of their breast cancer vaccine in 2011. Netherlands-based Philips Healthcare is currently constructing a medical imaging research and development center in the neighborhood, referred to as the Cleveland Health-Tech Corridor.

In 2008, Ohio was ranked No. 1 in the Midwest and 4th in the nation for biotech industry strength by Business Facilities magazine. As of 2008, there were over 1,100 biotech related firms operating in the state, employing 1.4 million residents overall in direct or indirect related fields, including healthcare, with $2.5 billion in investment in 2007. Ohio had three city-regions in the top 30 biotech locations in the country, with Cleveland-Akron ranked No. 20, Columbus #22, and Cincinnati #28.

The overall economic impact of the bioscience industry in Ohio, including healthcare, amounted to $148.2 billion in 2007, representing 15.7% of Ohio's economic output. Half of the biotech industry is located in northeast Ohio, with 574 firms, while central and southern Ohio are home to around 200 each. 635 companies are FDA-certified to manufacture medical devices. Biotech research and development employs directly 12,415 residents, while agricultural bioscience contributed the largest economic impact, at $10.7 billion. Medical device manufacturers employ 9,757 residents.

=== Healthcare ===
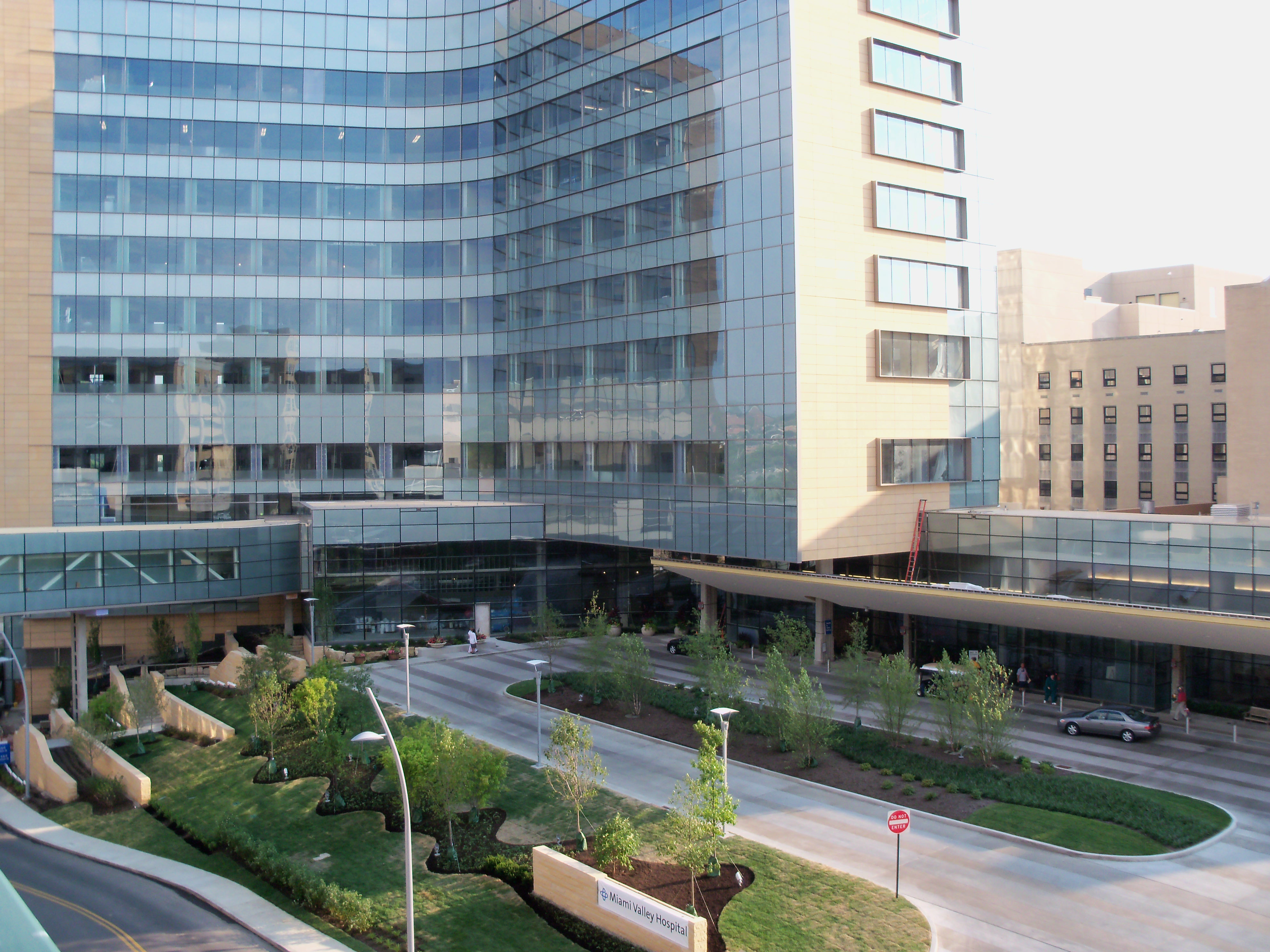
Miami Valley Hospital is ranked one of the nation's top hospitals with ratings from U.S. News & World Report, Forbes, and Healthgrades.

Major hospital employers include the Cleveland Clinic Health System with 41,400 employees, Mercy Health Partners in Cincinnati with 28,200, University Hospitals of Cleveland with 21,800, OhioHealth in Columbus with 15,300, ProMedica in Toledo with 14,500, and Premier Health Partners in Dayton with 14,000. Welltower, an S&P 500 company headquartered in Toledo, is a major healthcare real estate firm.

In 2011, Dayton was ranked the #3 city in the United States for "excellence in health care". The ranking is from HealthGrade's list of America's Top 50 Cities for Hospital Care. Other Ohio cities listed include Cincinnati at #6 and Cleveland at #16. Also in 2011, the cities of Cincinnati and Dayton were ranked No. 1 and #4 in the nation for emergency room care. Then in 2013, HealthGrades ranked the Dayton region number one in the nation for the lowest hospital mortality rate.

Ohio medical facilities include the Cleveland Clinic, which has locations throughout the world. In 2009, U.S. News & World Report ranked the clinic as the fourth best hospital in the country, and the #1 heart center in the country for the 15th year in a row. The Ohio State University Medical Center was ranked No. 21. Overall, the magazine ranked 16 Ohio hospitals among the best hospitals in the nation, making the state #3 in the country in total. The Cincinnati Children's Hospital Medical Center ranked No. 6 in the nation for pediatric hospitals, and overall, four children's hospitals in Ohio ranked among the best.

Apart from U.S. News & World Report, in 2010, HealthGrades ranked nine Ohio hospitals in the top 50 in the United States and 27 of Ohio's hospitals as Distinguished Hospitals for Clinical Excellence, with the majority of these hospitals in the Cleveland and Dayton areas. They also ranked 37 Ohio hospitals in the 5% of the country for emergency care service.

Child magazine ranked Cincinnati Children's #4, Nationwide Children's Hospital in Columbus #6, including #1 for emergency care, and Rainbow Babies & Children's Hospital in Cleveland #9. University Hospitals Case Medical Center in Cleveland was named in the top 15 for major teaching hospitals, while Riverside Methodist Hospital in Columbus and Hillcrest Hospital in Mayfield Heights ranked in the top 16 for minor teaching hospitals. Southwest General Health Center in Middleburg Heights was ranked in the top 15 for large community hospitals, and Mercy Hospital Clermont in Batavia Union Hospital in Dover Sycamore Medical Center in Miamisburg and Wooster Community Hospital in Wooster ranked in the top 16 for medium-sized community hospitals.

In 2009, Thomson-Reuters named the Kettering Medical Center in Kettering, The Ohio State University Medical Center in Columbus, Good Samaritan Hospital in Cincinnati, and Grandview Medical Center in Dayton to their top 30 list of teaching hospitals with cardiovascular programs.

==== Pharmacies ====
Ohio is home to pharmacy chains including Discount Drug Mart in Medina, and previously Phar-Mor, which was headquartered in Youngstown, and Revco, which was headquartered in Twinsburg.

=== Education ===
Ohio's medical colleges are sixth in the nation in terms of economic impact, resulting in 425,000 direct or indirect positions and $37.2 billion.

The University System of Ohio is the nation's largest comprehensive public system of higher education. Member universities include the University of Cincinnati, which has a $3+ billion annual economic impact and is the largest employer in Cincinnati, Kent State University, which contributes a $1.9 billion economic impact in Northeast Ohio, and the University of Toledo, which contributes a $1.1 billion economic impact in Northwest Ohio.

=== Agriculture ===
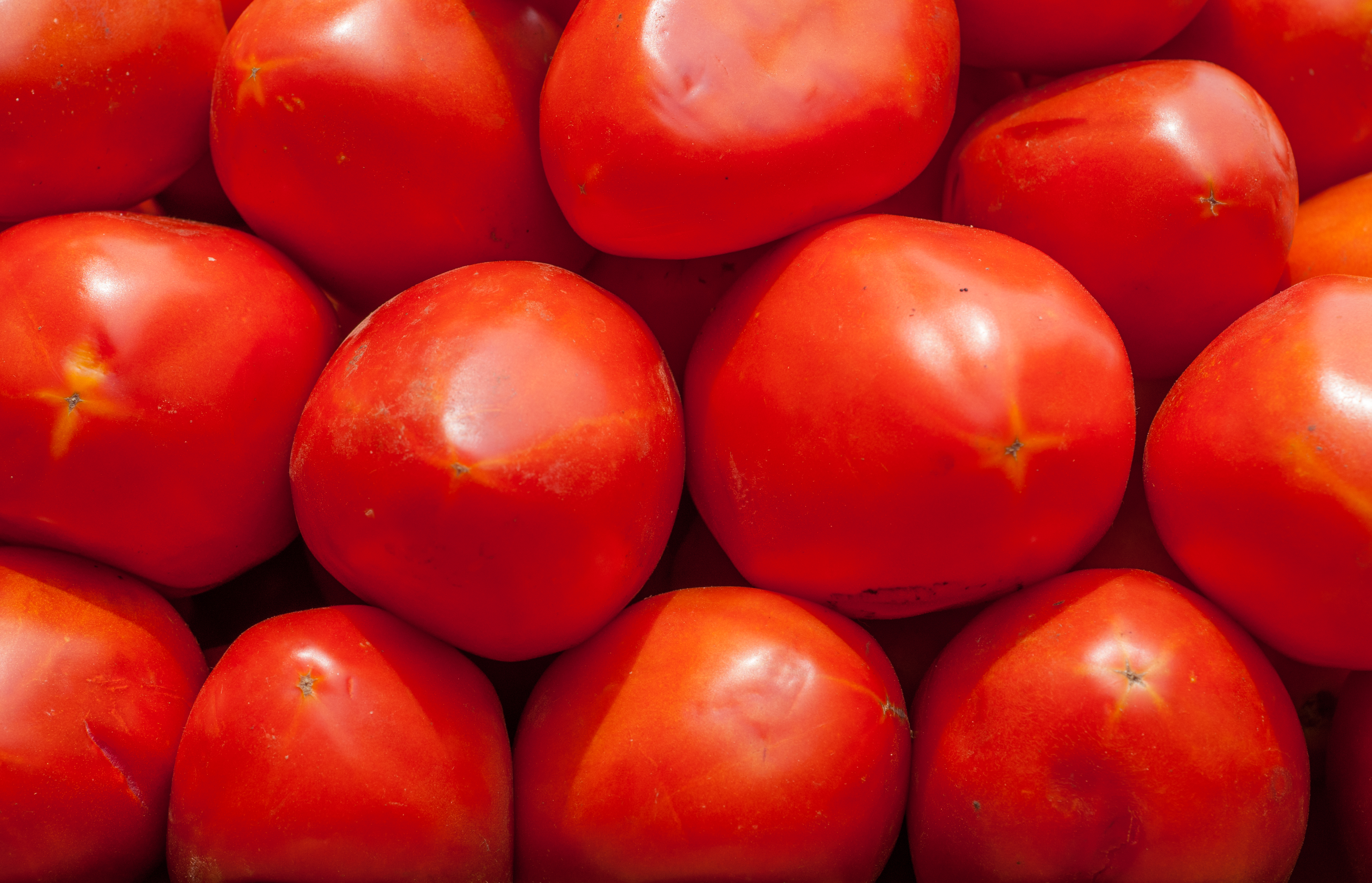
Tomatoes are an example of why Ohio's agriculture industry has deep relations with Ohio's food processing industry. Ohio is the 3rd largest producer of tomatoes out of all 50 states in the United States, and, in turn, the world's largest ketchup processing plant is located in Fremont.

Ohio's agricultural industries represent $124 billion of the state's economic output, employing one in eight Ohioans directly or indirectly. Ohio's agricultural market exports many different products. Ohio ranks 1st in the production of Swiss cheese out of all 50 states, 3rd in egg production, 6th in soybeans, 8th in hogs, and 9th in corn for grain.

Ohio's corn and small grains sectors are supported by industry groups including the Ohio Corn & Wheat Growers Association (a membership organization representing nearly 2,000 farmers that advocates for public policy supporting growers) along with related checkoff programs for market development, research, and promotion.

The agriculture and food processing and eatery industries are heavily intertwined in Ohio. Ohio, being the 3rd largest producer of tomatoes in the United States, in turn has the world's largest ketchup processing plant in Fremont.

The number of farms in Ohio stood at 75,462 as of 2018.

==== Horticulture and floriculture ====
Ohio is a producer of horticulture products, from greenhouse and nursery plants to bulbs. The state is a producer of white ash trees for landscaping, totalling 25,000 annually. California, Florida, Texas, Michigan, and Ohio accounted for 42% of the nation's production of bedding plants in 2002. Oberer's Flowers, headquartered in Dayton, is the nation's fifth-largest florist, while Aris Horticulture, headquartered in Barberton, is active in research and breeding. Lake County Nursery offers over 1,000 varieties of plants and California-based Monrovia Nursery Company operates nurseries in Springfield.

=== Energy ===
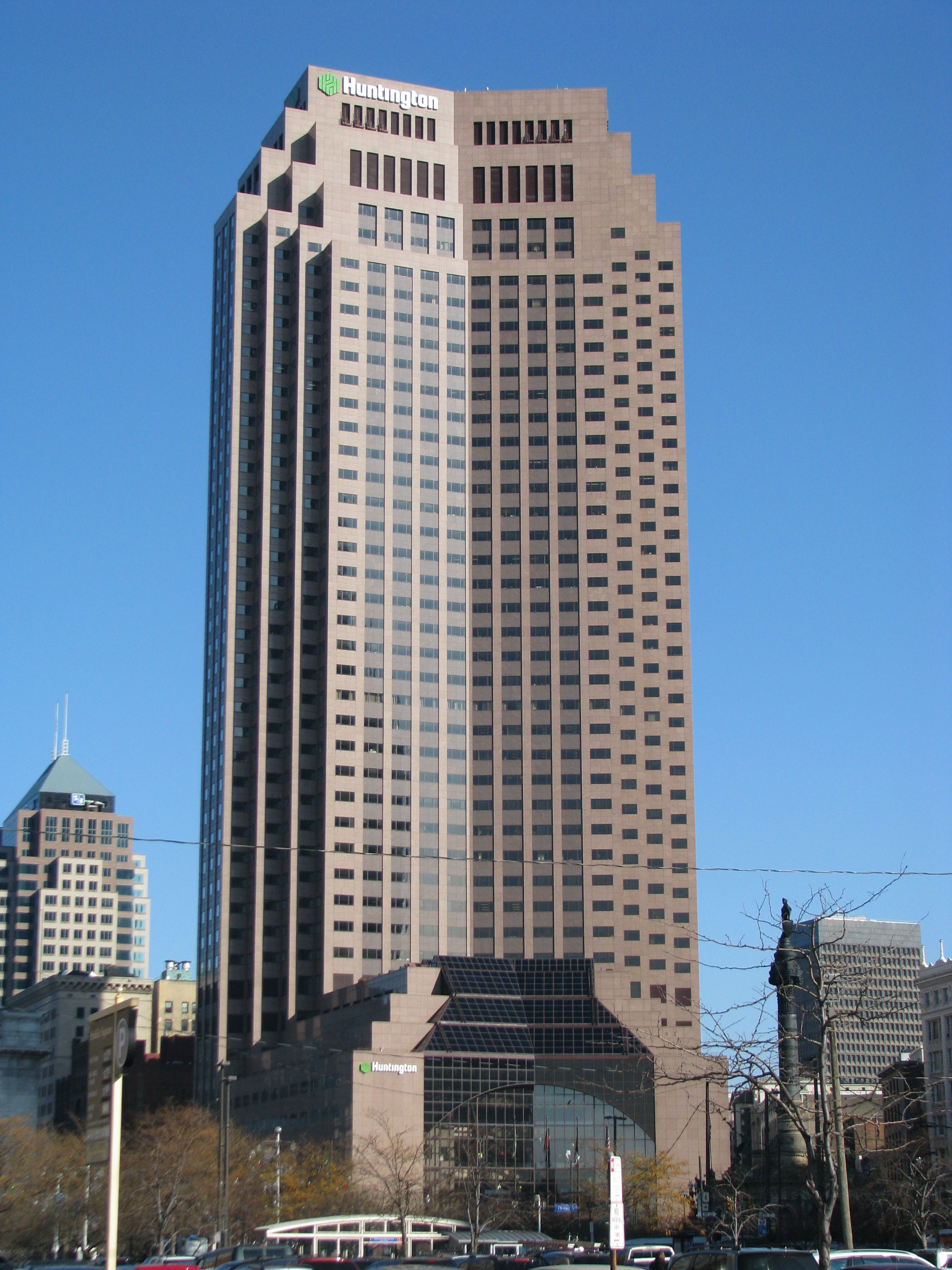
200 Public Square (formally called the British Petroleum Tower) located in Cleveland

The energy sector of Ohio is composed of thousands of companies and cities representing the oil, natural gas, coal, solar, wind energy, fuel cell, biofuel, geothermal, hydroelectric, and other related industries. Ohio is second nationally in solar energy industry manufacturing as Toledo is considered a national solar hub, nicknamed "Solar Valley." In 2021, First Solar announced its third Ohio facility, a new $680 million photovoltaic panel manufacturing plant in suburban Toledo that will bring its total production capacity in the state to nearly 6 gigawatts annually.

Oil and natural gas accounts for $3.1 billion annually in sales while ethanol generates $750 million. The state is recognized internationally as the "Fuel Cell Corridor", and Hamilton is poised to become the biggest municipal provider of renewable energy in the Midwest, and one of the largest in the country, with over 70%. In 2008, the state led the country in alternative energy manufacturing according to Site Selection Magazine, while the natural gas industry has experienced growth due to the Great Shale Gas Rush.

Several notable energy companies are headquartered in the state, including American Electric Power, Columbia Gas of Ohio, DPL Inc., Marathon Petroleum Company, American Municipal Power, Inc., Cliffs Natural Resources, Murray Energy, FirstEnergy, Oxford Resource Partners LP, AB Resources, American Hydrogen Corporation, and IGS Energy. Rolls-Royce North America's Energy Systems Inc., a subsidiary of United Kingdom-based Rolls-Royce plc, is headquartered in Mt. Vernon, specializing in gas compression, power generation, and pipeline technologies. Ultra Premium Oilfield Services and V&M Star Steel operate steel production facilities in the state, which cater to energy exploration.

Ohio consumed 160.176 TWh of electricity in 2005, fourth among U.S. states, and has a storied history in the sector, including the first offshore oil drilling platform in the world, and a modern, renewable energy economy along with the traditional nuclear, oil, coal, and gas industries.

=== Research and development ===
Ohio is a major research and development center, home to many institutions. In 2008, institutions and companies in the state won 10 R&D 100 Awards, given annually to the top 100 innovations recognized by R&D Magazine, finishing second behind California. Ohio State University is among the country's top public research institutions at #7. Ohio is ranked in the top eight for states conducting clinical trials, including conducting the most clinical trials per capita.

In 2006, the state had a high-tech payroll of $9.8 billion, with 155,174 high-tech employees at 10,756 high tech locations. In 2005, industry in Ohio spent $5.9 billion on research and development, with colleges spending $1.5 billion, but by 2009, $8.2 billion in R&D contracts were identified, ranking 13th nationally. Ohio receives around $2.7 billion annually in federal R&D funds, ranking #9.

=== Insurance ===
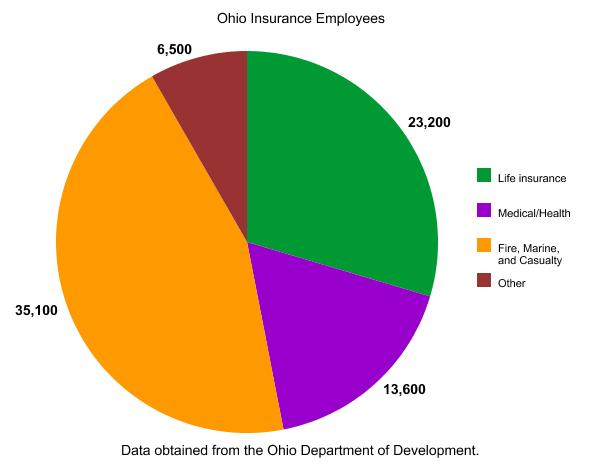
Ohio insurance employees work in a broad array of sub-industries. Around 44.8% of insurance employees work in fire, marine, and casualty insurance; this helps make Ohio the 4th largest casualty insurance state, in the measure of employees, trailing behind only California, New York, and Illinois.

Ohio is a major center for insurance corporations, ranking 6th out of all 50 states in the insurance industry, based on overall employment, and Ohio ranks 4th in casualty insurance out of all 50 states. Ohio also ranks 6th out of all 50 states in the number of domestic insurance companies headquartered in the state. As far as gross state product, from the period of 1990–1999 Ohio insurance contribution to Ohio's gross state product grew about 161% from $2.6 billion to $6.8 billion, despite population growth from 1990 to 2000 of only about 4.67%, from 10,847,115 to 11,353,140. Ohio's insurance employment is expected to grow continuously at a rate of 9.8%. Ohio is home to the 3rd most claim examiners in the United States, out of all 50 states.

Five Fortune 500 companies are Ohio-based insurance companies. These companies are:

- Nationwide Insurance, in Columbus
- Progressive Corporation, in Mayfield
- Western & Southern Financial Group, in Cincinnati
- Cincinnati Financial, in Fairfield
- American Financial Group, in Cincinnati

Ohio Casualty, a subsidiary of Liberty Mutual, is also headquartered in Ohio, in Fairfield.

=== Financial services ===
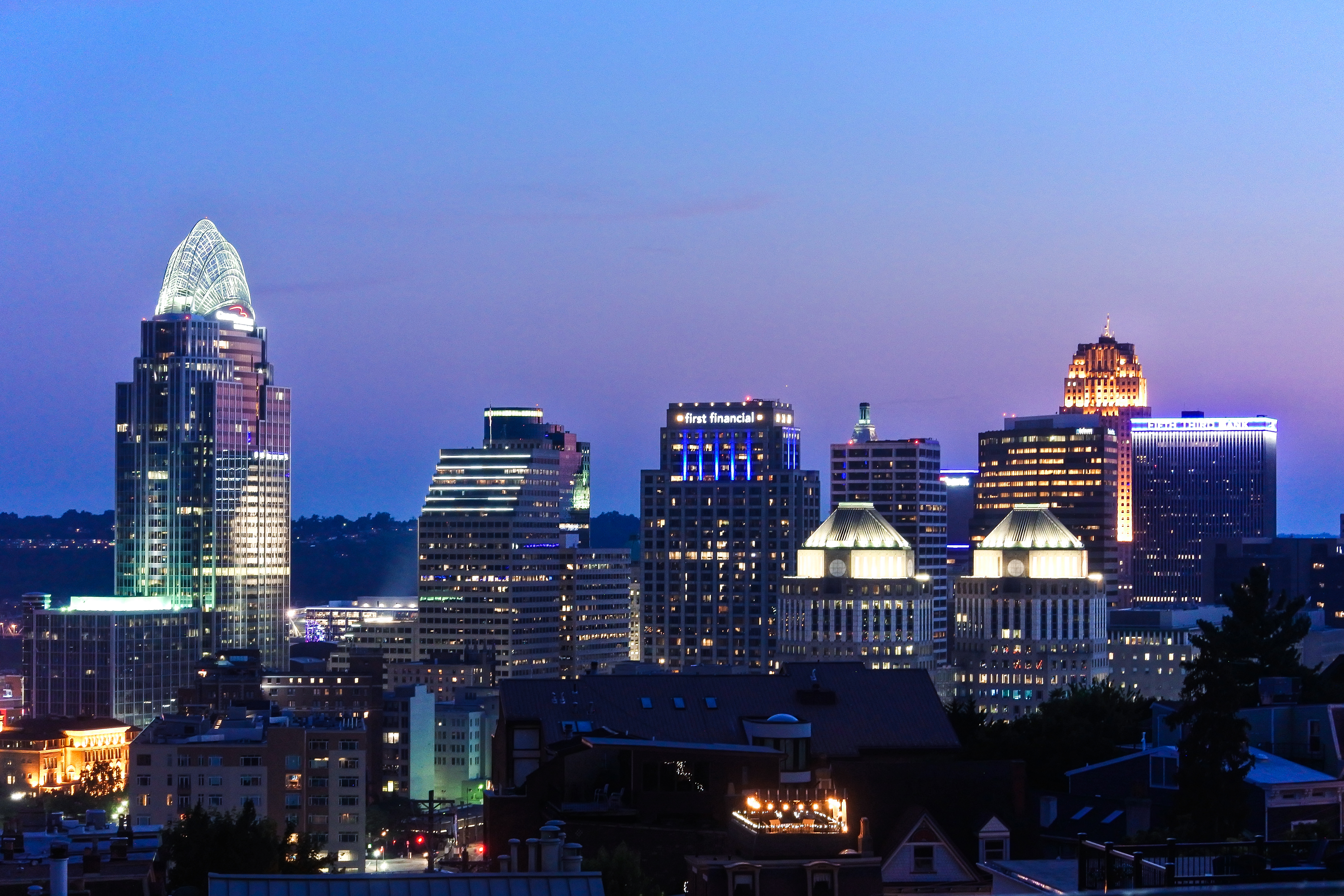
Cincinnati hosts several large financial institutions and insurance companies.

Ohio is home to three commercial banks that rank among the largest commercial banks in the United States as measured by asset size. Up until 2008, Ohio had four banks among the Top 25, however the acquisition of Cleveland-based National City Corp. by Pittsburgh-based PNC Financial Services eliminated the fourth.

- KeyBank, headquartered in the Key Tower in Cleveland, is the 27th largest bank in the US.
- Fifth Third Bank, the bank holding company for Fifth Third Bank N.A. headquartered in Cincinnati. Currently second to PNC in market share in the state, and tops among Ohio-based banks in the state, it is the 26th largest bank in the US.
- Huntington Bancshares, the bank holding company for The Huntington National Bank headquartered in the Huntington Center in Columbus, is the 38th largest bank in the US.
- Wright-Patt Credit Union, headquartered in Dayton, is the largest credit union in Ohio with 23 member centers, $4.3 billion in assets, and serves over 375,000 member-owners.

The Federal Reserve Bank of Cleveland is located in the state. Other notable institutions headquartered in the state include First Federal Bank of the Midwest, Liberty Savings Bank, and Park National Bank.

Germany-based BMW operates a financial subsidiary in Dublin.

=== Automobile manufacturing ===
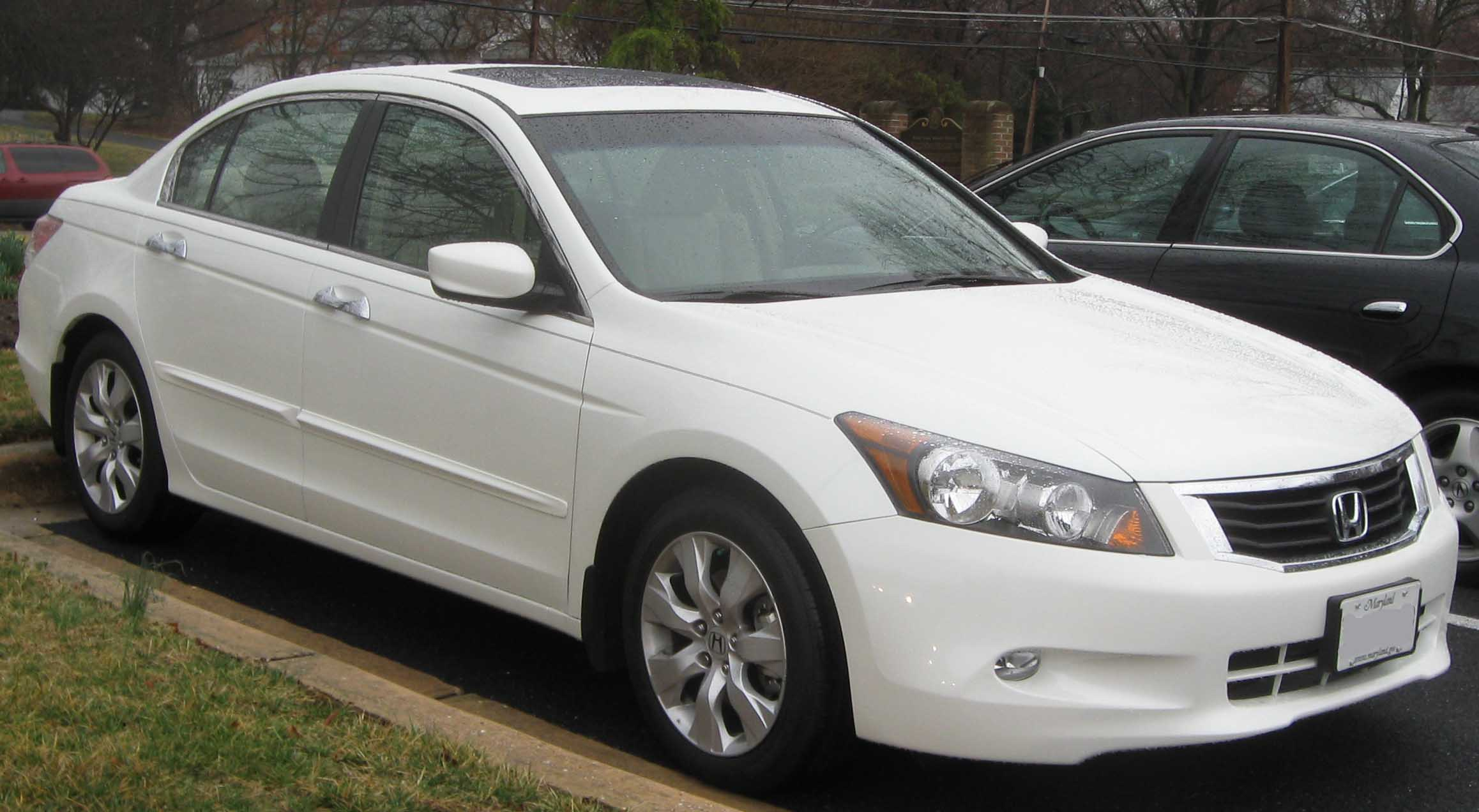
The Honda Accord was the single model that was most produced in Ohio. Almost all Accords are assembled in Marysville. The Accord's Ohio production exceeded 200,000, one of only five models to do so in Ohio.

Ohio native Charles Kettering invented the self-starter for the automobile, an advancement which contributed to the mainstreaming of the transport.

The current state of the motor vehicle industry in Ohio is mixed and dotted. In 2002, the Ohio motor vehicle industry produced about $16 billion of items. This is about 14% of the automobile production of the United States, and Ohio outputs every state in production of motor vehicles except for Michigan. These $16 billion account for approximately 4.1% of Ohio's gross state product; however, the motor vehicle industry only accounts for 1.1% of the United States' output. In 2003, Ohio was able to produce about 1,885,000 motor vehicles, accounting for 15.6% of the United States' production, and, again, more than any state except for Michigan; 928,000 of these were automobiles.

The Ohio Department of Development estimates that there are 555 motor vehicle production establishments in Ohio, and that by employing around 138,000 people, Ohio motor vehicle production employees account for 12.7% of the United States' motor vehicle production employees. Despite sharp losses since 1999, the motor vehicle production industry was able to recover in 2001, producing a net gain of 148,000 vehicles. General Motors produced the highest number of motor vehicles in Ohio, with 36.5% of the production of motor vehicles in Ohio, followed closely by Honda with 35.9%. Other major motor vehicle producers in Ohio include DaimlerChrysler (with 17.5% of production) and Ford (with 10.5% of production). However, despite the growth listed above, employment statistics and outlooks are much more grim.

In 2004, the number of people employed in the motor vehicle assembly industry in Ohio was reported to be around 31,000, down from about 40,000 throughout the 1990s, while in the motor vehicle parts production industry in Ohio, in December 1997, employment stood at approximately 122,000 employees; however, that number dropped by about 26% to 90,000 employees by 2004. Despite the growth facts above, the loss of employment is more likely to directly affect Ohio's economy. The Ohio Bureau of Labor Market Information estimates that there will be 3,300 less assembly employees and 2,400 less parts manufacturing employees in 2012 than 2002. Major firms operating in the state include Ford, Honda, and General Motors. Some major motor vehicle assembly production plants in the state include the Toledo Complex, Marysville Auto Plant, East Liberty Auto Plant, Ohio Assembly, and Toledo North Assembly. France-based Faurecia Group operates a division in Toledo.

In June 2010, auto parts manufacturer Sanoh America, located in Streetsboro, announced a $3.5 million, 35,000-square-foot (3,300 m^{2}) expansion of their North American headquarters, while Austria-based automotive part manufacturer Miba announced $30 million in new investments at production sites around the state. In September of that year, the new 87,100-square-foot (8,090 m^{2}) R&D facility of Amtex, Inc., a subsidiary of Japan-based Hayashi Telempu Co. based in Lebanon, became operational in Plymouth.

=== Iron and steel ===
Ohio is considered the historical center of steel production in the U.S. The state produces annually around 14.5 million tons, with a $7.2 billion state economic impact. The largest steel foundry in North America is located in Columbus, Columbus Castings. It was formerly part of Buckeye Steel Castings, which traces its root back to the 19th century.

Ohio produces between 14% and 17% of the United States' raw steel. The sector of objects made from purchased steel in Ohio ranks 2nd out of all 50 states, and 3rd in the sector of iron, steel, and ferroalloys.

70% of the United States' electrometallurgical ferroalloy manufacturing employees are located in Ohio. The entire industry as a whole, although not as concentrated as the electrometallurgical ferroalloy manufacturing sector, employs 34,000 paid workers at 234 individual workplaces. Ohio's 234 workplaces make up 9.5% of the United States industry's workplaces, and the 34,000 paid workers make up 13.6% of the United States industry's workers. Of these workers and workplaces, the sector of iron, steel, and ferroalloys make up the largest sector in Ohio's industry, with 17,000 paid workers in 73 workplaces.

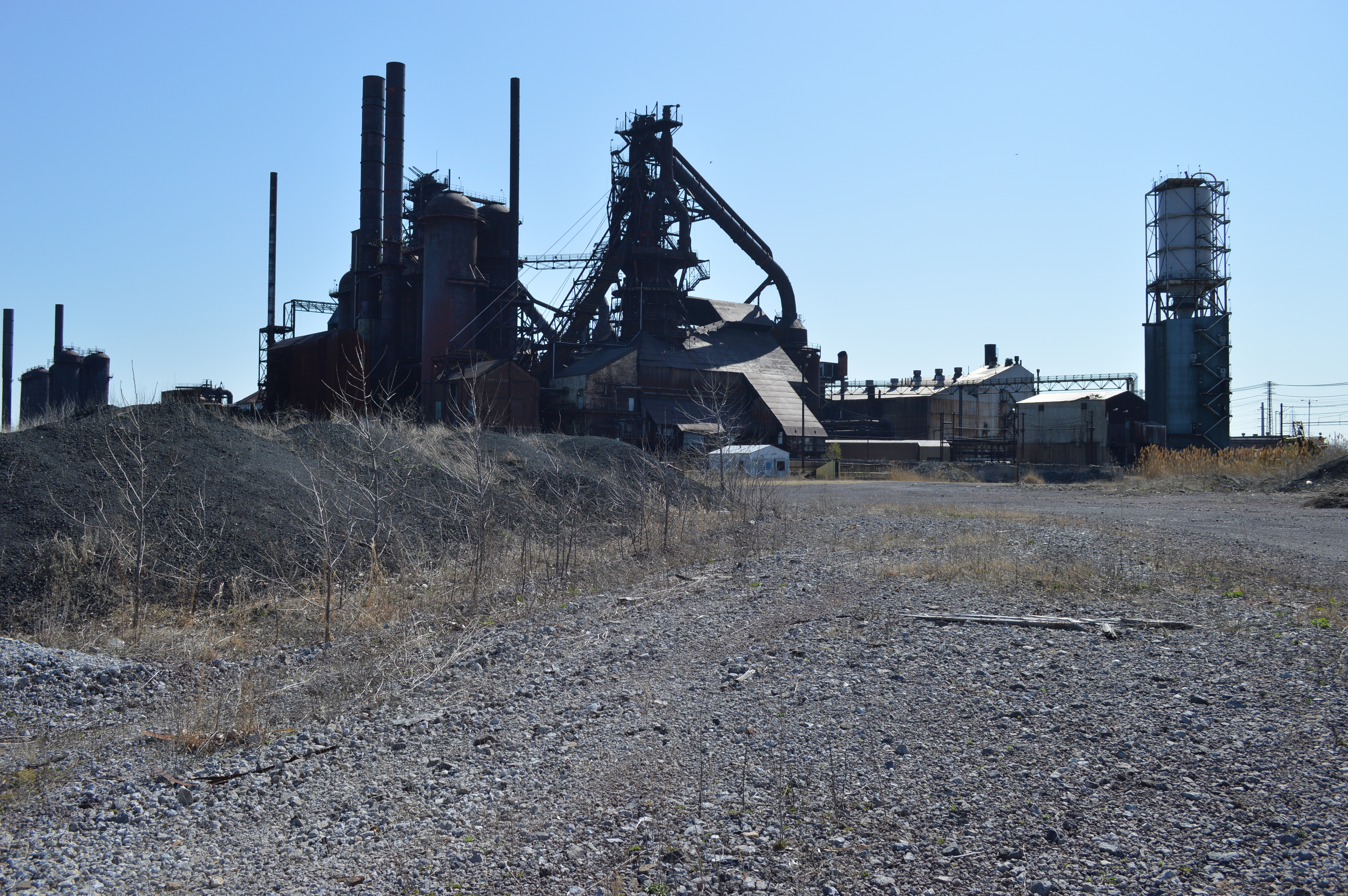
The former US-Steel-Kobe works

However, despite Ohio's large presence in the iron and steel market, employment rates have declined in Ohio, generally attributed to the weakening national economy. Between 1998 and 2005, the number of Ohio iron and steel industry workers decreased from 52,700 to 34,000. The Ohio Department of Development predicts the decreases will continue in coming years. The average annual salary for iron and steel industry workers in Ohio was $59,686, compared the national industry average of $53,352.

Major iron and steel manufacturers with world headquarters in Ohio: Timken Company, located in Canton, and Worthington Industries, located in Columbus. Other manufacturers include Cleveland-Cliffs in Cleveland, and Republic Engineered Products, North America's largest supplier of specialty bar quality steel, located in Canton. V&M Star Steel, a subsidiary of France-based Vallourec, broke ground on a $650 million production facility in Youngstown in June 2010.

In August 2010 Arizona-based International Technical Coatings announced plans to construct a 667,000-square-foot (62,000 m^{2}), $15 million production facility in Columbus, while Pro-Tec, a joint venture between U. S. Steel and Japan-based Kobe Steel headquartered in Leipsic, announced in September 2010 a $290 million, 415,000-square-foot (38,600 m^{2}) expansion of existing facilities.

In April 2018, Cleveland-Cliffs Inc. broke ground on a $700 million hot-briquetted iron production facility in Toledo, Ohio. It was expected to be complete in 2020, and will process nearly 2.5 million tons per year of iron ore for use in the domestic steel industry.

=== Rubber and plastics ===
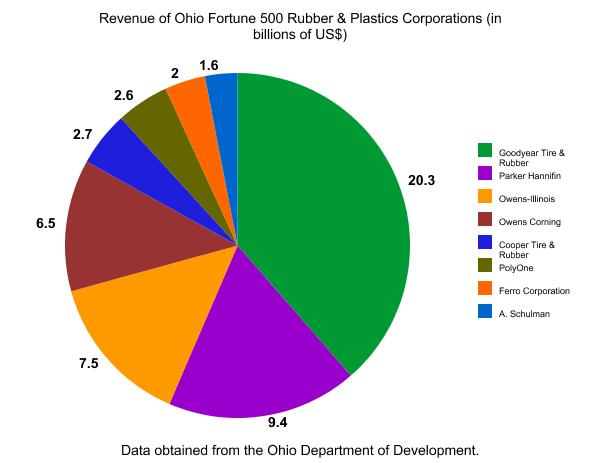
The rubber and plastics industry in Ohio is largely dominated by Goodyear Tire & Rubber, in terms of revenue, although there are more non-rubber producing Fortune 500 rubber and plastics companies in Ohio than Ohio Fortune 500 rubber and plastics companies that do produce rubber.

One of Ohio's historically strong industries is the rubber and plastics industry. Ohio ranks 1st of all 50 states in rubber and plastics production, producing around $17.4 billion of rubber and plastics shipments annually. Seven Fortune 1000 rubber and/or plastics corporations are located in Ohio:

- Goodyear Tire & Rubber, Akron
- Parker Hannifin, Cleveland
- Owens-Illinois, Perrysburg, Ohio
- Owens Corning, Toledo
- Cooper Tire & Rubber, Findlay
- PolyOne, Avon Lake
- A. Schulman, Akron

Ohio ranks 1st in the gross state product of the rubber and plastics industry of any state. For the 5-year period of 2000–2004, inflation-adjusted production increased around 10%. In addition, in this period, the US rubber and plastics industry only grew 6%.

Ohio exported around $1.3 billion worth of rubber and plastics shipments in 2006. Rubber and plastics exports make up for 7.3% of total sales. Canada is the largest importer of Ohio's $1.3 billion worth of exports, accounting for 46% of this amount. The Census Bureau expects that an addition $1.1 billion worth of material is indirectly exported, through the means of other goods that are made from rubbers and plastics, including motor vehicles and machinery.

However, despite increased production, employment has been decreasing in Ohio's rubber and plastic industry. In 2000, Ohio employed around 92,000 rubber and plastics industry workers. By 2006, those rates have declined by about 26% to about 69,000 workers. The Ohio Bureau of Labor Market Information predicts that, from 2004 to 2014, there will be 11,200 less workers in Ohio's industry. They also predict that plastics employment in Ohio will decrease by 13.7%, and that rubber products employment will decrease by 20.7%. The industry currently employs about 73,000 Ohio workers, and employs about 12.3% of the United States' rubber employees, and 7.8% of the United States' plastics employees.

In October 2010, Sweden-based Hexpol AB announced the acquisition of Solon-based Excel Polymers for $215 million.

In August 2011, China-based A3T L.L.C broke ground on their North American headquarters in Akron and signed an R&D agreement with the University of Akron.

=== Other manufacturing ===
==== History ====
In 1837, William Procter and James Gamble founded a candle and soapmaking business in Cincinnati called Procter & Gamble. In the 1880s, the company introduced the product Ivory, a bar of soap. Eventually they began manufacturing Crisco, and sponsored radio dramas, which led to the name "soap operas". Today Procter & Gamble is the 8th largest company in the world by market capitalization fully diversified in household products, and has 135,000 employees worldwide, with manufacturing operations located throughout the state, and their headquarters still in Cincinnati.

In 1866, Henry Sherwin and Edward Williams founded Sherwin-Williams, a general building supplies company, in Cleveland. Their first factory was opened on the Cuyahoga River in 1873, and today the company has four manufacturing and distribution facilities in Ohio, located in Columbus, Cincinnati, Grove City, and Bedford Heights, and numerous locations throughout the country and world, with their world headquarters maintained in Cleveland. The company employs 3,394 residents alone just in the Cleveland-area.

In 1879, James Ritty, a saloon owner, invented a mechanical cash register, paving way for its production through the National Cash Register Company, based in Dayton. The company prospered through the 21st century, producing automated teller machines, barcode scanners, and other related products, employing thousands. It was eventually relocated to Georgia in 2009.

In 1886 Ohio-native Charles Martin Hall helped pioneer the Hall–Héroult process, which made aluminum inexpensive to produce. He sold his share in 1888 to the Pittsburgh Reduction Company, known today as Alcoa. Alcoa has operations in the state, including facilities in Cleveland which manufacture aluminum wheels for Automobili Lamborghini.

Between 1902 and 1911 the Marion Steam Shovel Company, whose founders were Edward Huber, George W. King and Henry Barnhardt, shipped 112 then state-of-the-art power shovels to Panama to dig the Panama Canal. A successor firm also built the crawler-transporters that were used by NASA in the 1960s and 1970s to transport Saturn V rockets to the launch pad at Cape Canaveral to send men into space and to the Moon.

In 1907, a janitor named James Spangler working for the Hoover family invented the first electronically portable vacuum cleaner. Production of the device began at a factory in New Berlin (later renamed North Canton), and today the company is known as The Hoover Company, with its headquarters still located in North Canton.

In 1918, the Parker Appliance Company was founded in Cleveland, later becoming the Parker Hannifin Corporation. They manufacture motion and control technologies, with locations throughout Ohio, the country, and the world. Their headquarters is maintained in Cleveland, employing 2,201 residents in the local area.

==== Present ====
Overall, Ohio is home to 21,250 manufacturing operations. Cincinnati is ranked No. 6, Cleveland #10, and Columbus #19 respectively in the nation for manufacturing jobs. Ohio leads the nation in general-purpose machinery production and is #2 in metalworking machinery production. In 2004, Ohio was third in the nation for major industrial operations, and second in the nation for total manufacturing payroll. Ohio was third in the nation in manufacturing GDP in 2008, but has lost 106,629 manufacturing jobs and over 1,000 manufacturers since 2007.

Crown Equipment Corporation, headquartered in New Bremen, employs 8,300 residents in the state and is the 7th largest manufacturer of heavy-duty equipment in the world. They recently unveiled 20 new fork-lift models employing fuel cell technology, bringing that total product-specific inventory to 29 models. Ametek Technical and Industrial Products is headquartered in Kent and a manufacturer of industrial products with sales of $950 million in 2009. Headquartered in Toledo, Libbey, Inc. is the leading producer of glass tableware products in the Western Hemisphere.

Miamisburg-based NewPage Corporation is the largest producer of coated paper in North America, with sales of $3.1 billion. Verantis Corporation, headquartered in Middleburg Heights, is an environmental engineering company.

Germany-based ThyssenKrupp has several operations in the state, including AIN Plastics in Columbus, Ken-Mac Metals in Cleveland, Copper and Brass sales divisions in Toledo, Cleveland, and Dayton, a ThyssenKrupp Industrial Services division in Toledo, and a ThyssenKrupp Bilstein of America sales division in Hamilton. ThyssenKrupp Krause is located in Cleveland, Vertical System Elevators in Cincinnati as well as other ThyssenKrupp Elevator divisions in Cincinnati, Westerville, Northwood, and Broadview Heights, and Rotek Incorporated is located in Aurora, which underwent an $82 million facility expansion in 2008.

United Kingdom-based Mondi Group has facilities in Lancaster. Brush Wellman is headquartered Mayfield Heights and is a supplier of alloy, precious metals, electronic, and engineered material systems and products, with a major facility in Elmore. Liebert is a manufacturer of environmental, power, and monitoring systems located in Columbus.

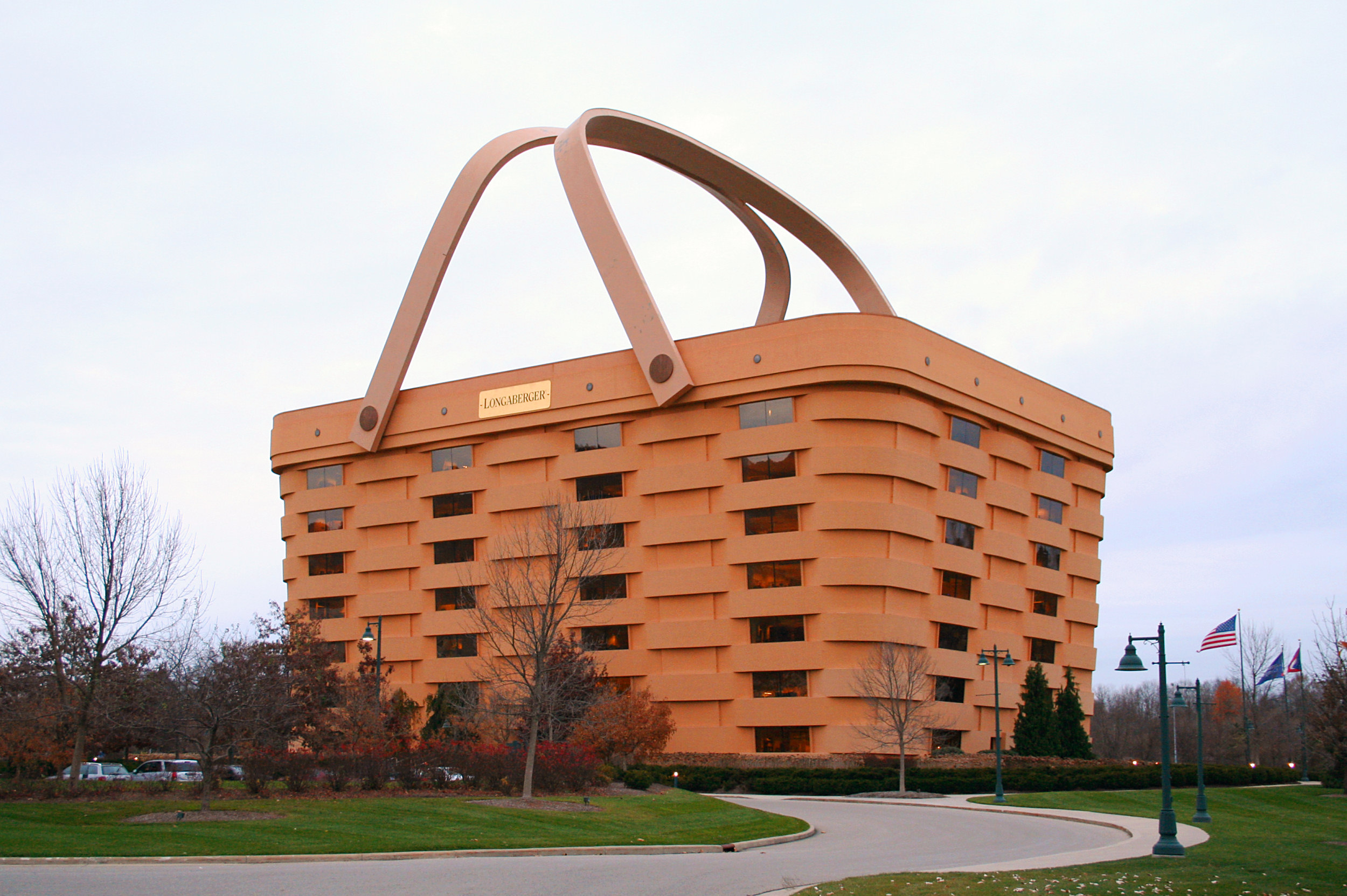
The Longaberger Company former headquarters in Newark

Headquartered in Cleveland and founded in 1932, MTD Products employs 6,800 residents in the state and is a major manufacturer of heavy duty lawn equipment. Advanced Drainage Systems headquartered in Hilliard employs 3,900 residents and specializes in manufacturing industrial components and equipment. Aleris International, headquartered in Beachwood, employs 8,500 residents and is one of the world's largest recyclers of aluminum and zinc, manufacturing alloy sheet metal. Park-Ohio, Inc., located in Cleveland, operates in 16 countries with over 3,000 employees. Mallory Marine is a manufacturer of aquatic travel components and located in Cleveland. Cincinnati-based Michelman, Inc. is involved in developing water-based barrier and functional coating.

Newark-based The Longaberger Company is a manufacturer of home and lifestyle products, and Brooklyn is home to the American Greetings Corporation, the world's largest publicly traded greeting card manufacturer.

Sweden-based Trelleborg AB recently announced they were moving their Wheel Systems Americas headquarters from Hartville to Fairlawn. Westlake-based Nordson Corporation is a manufacturer of precision equipment. Parma-based GrafTech International Limited is a manufacturer of carbon and graphite products with facilities on four continents.

ESCORT is a manufacturer of radar detection devices and navigational services headquartered in West Chester.

New Jersey-based Hartz Mountain Corporation, a pets-product manufacturer, announced an expansion of their existing operations in the state in 2010. Little Tikes is a toy manufacturer headquartered in Hudson.

In August 2010, Switzerland-based WICOR announced plans for a manufacturing operation in Urbana, while in September of that year Italian-owned Eurostampa North America announced plans for the construction of a new $7.2 million, 70,000-square-foot (6,500 m^{2}) facility in the Roselawn neighborhood of Cincinnati, which broke ground later month and will also serve as their headquarters.

GE Lighting is headquartered in Cleveland, with manufacturing operations in the state, including Bucyrus, which was awarded $60 million for expansion in September 2010 for the manufacturing of energy-efficient light bulbs. In October 2010, West Virginia-based Simonton Windows announced it was moving its headquarters to Columbus. Deceuninck North America, a subsidiary of Belgium-based Deceuninck NV, is headquartered in Monroe and operates one of the largest vinyl window extruders in North America.

Australia-based Blastmaster announced in September 2010 plans to locate their North American headquarters in the Columbus area. In October 2010, California-based Avery Dennison opened their Customer Innovation Center in Miamisburg to showcase their RFID technology.

===== Chemicals =====
Hexion Specialty Chemicals is headquartered in Columbus and is a manufacturer of resins and coatings. Lubrizol Corporation is a provider of specialty chemicals headquartered in Wickliffe and a Fortune 500 company. Kentucky-based Ashland Performance Materials is located in Dublin. Columbus is home to the world's largest clearinghouse of chemicals data, CAS, or Chemical Abstracts.

===== Robotics and lasers =====
In June 2010, Yaskawa America announced the construction of their new North American headquarters in Dayton, a 300,000-square-foot (28,000 m^{2}) facility, which broke ground in August. KC Robotics, located in Fairfield, is a major distributor of robots, including Yaskawa's Motoman.

Robotics Research, located in Cincinnati, is a developer of robotic technology. FANUC Robotics America, Inc. has a regional headquarters located in Mason. Other companies include YAC Robot Systems in Hamilton, Bellevue Manufacturing Company in Bellevue, Panasonic Robotics in Hilliard, Ohio(shares office with INS Robotics) and Adept Technology, which has an office in Cincinnati.

Lockheed Martin in Akron manufacturers laser-enhanced sniper systems for the Department of Defense. AT&F Steel in Cleveland operates the largest Hybrid Laser Arc Welding facility in the United States. Elyria-based RIDGID, a division of Missouri-based Emerson, manufacturers hand-held laser devices.

===== Nanotechnology =====
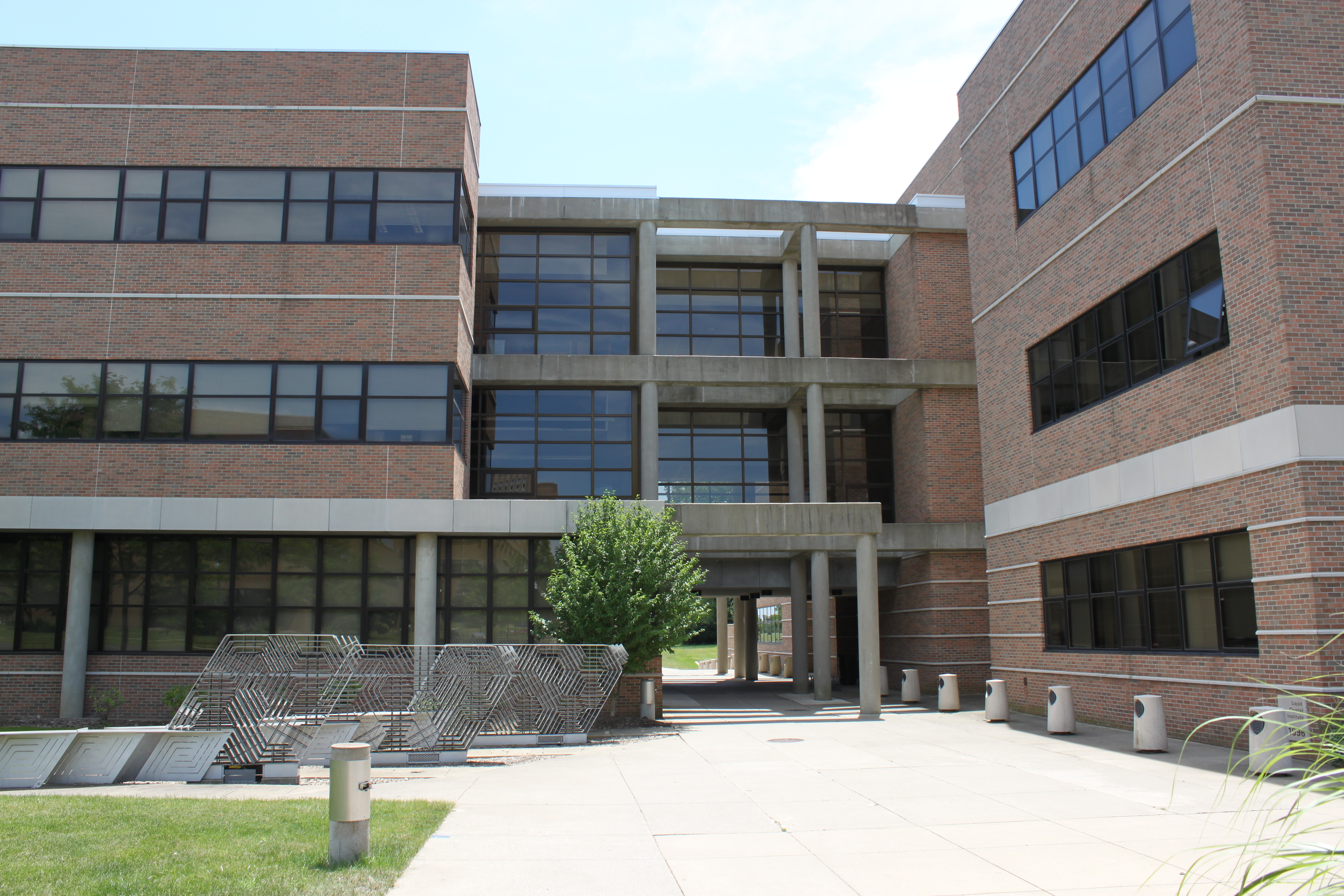
The Liquid Crystal Institute, headquartered on the campus of Kent State University, made early contributions to the liquid crystal display.

Kent State University was one of the inventors of the modern liquid crystal display at their Liquid Crystal Institute.

Through 2005, Ohio was ranked in the top ten for states with the best environment for nanotechnology development. The Center for Multifunctional Polymer Nanomaterials and Devices at the Ohio State University was awarded $22.5 million from the Third Frontier around the start of the 21st century with a goal of returning $78 million in research and commercialization. The University of Dayton Research Institute was also awarded investments from the state. Other major research institutes include the Institute for Nanoscale Science and Technology at the University of Cincinnati. The University of Toledo is home to professor Abdul-Majeed Azad, a world-renowned nanotechnologist who won a Nano50 Award from NASA in 2007 for developing a method of converting steel mill waste into nanoscale iron particles, and is also a recent recipient of the Fulbright Distinguished Chair Award.

Nanotek Instruments, a Dayton area company, is a nanomaterial research and development company focused on bringing nanotechnology into consumer applications. Founded in 1997, Nanotek Instruments currently holds some of the oldest intellectual property on the "wonder material" graphene. Nanotek's current research focuses on using the properties of graphene in energy storage applications such as Li-ion batteries and supercapacitors. Their research on graphene based supercapacitors was selected as one of the top five nanotechnologies of 2010.

In 2007, Nanotek Instruments spun off Angstron Materials for the purpose of mass-producing graphene materials. Angstron Materials, also located in Dayton, is currently the world's largest producer of nano graphene platelets. Angstron's graphene platelets are being used in multiple research areas, including energy storage, thermal management, nanocomposites, transparent conducting films, sensor, and lithium-ion batteries.

Other Ohio companies involved in nanotechnology development include MesoCoat, the winner of three R&D 100 awards; SRICO in Columbus; Cleveland Clinic; Zyvex Performance Materials (developers of the Piranha Unmanned Surface Vessel); PowderMet, a research and development operation; General Electric, NanoFilm, Procter & Gamble, Battelle Memorial Institute, NanoSperse, First Solar, Goodyear Tire and Rubber, and Midwest Optoelectronics.

=== Logistics ===
The Columbus/Dayton corridor is considered one of two "centroids" in America's logistics sector. This is evident in the Dayton region, in part, with the expansion of a 1,000,000-square-foot (93,000 m^{2}) distribution center by Caterpillar Inc. and a major Payless ShoeSource distribution center. Transportation and warehousing employs 183,000 Ohioans, amounting to a $12 billion industry, or 3.6% of the GSP. Since 2003, Ohio has added 21,500 logistics jobs.

Ohio has the 8th largest highway system, and 4th largest interstate system in the country. Ohio's trucking industry ranks 4th in the nation with a total economic output of $5.2 billion. The state ranks third in the country in total value of inbound and outbound shipments at $907 billion, and first in value of outbound shipments at $244 billion.

Ohio has the fourth largest rail system, and is ranked third in total economic output at $1.3 billion.

Major employers include BAX Global, now part of Germany-based DB Schenker; Total Quality Logistics, UPS, FedEx, Roadway Express, CSX Corp, Pacer International, and ABX Air. Parsec Inc., based in Cincinnati, controls 45% of the nation's intermodal transportation business. The logistics headquarters of ThyssenKrupp Industrial Services North America is located in Northwood.

Wooster-based TechniGraphics is a provider of imagery and geospatial services to the U.S. intelligence community.

In 2009, CSX began the construction of a $175 million intermodal facility in North Baltimore, employing OCR technology from the Saudi Arabia-based Gulf Stevedoring Contracting Company. As part of their "National Gateway" project, it is a rival to Norfolk Southern's "Heartland Corridor" project. Norfolk Southern operates a large intermodal facility in Columbus as part of their "Heartland Corridor," which the company recently constructed.

Cleveland Ships in October 2010 announced a bid to take over Northrop Grumman's shipbuilding operations, and later that month Canada-based Great Lakes Feeder Lines announced the Port of Cleveland was a target for its U.S. international container service headquarters, the first on the Great Lakes.

=== Food processing ===
Ohio's food processing industry produces $23.5 billion in food shipments annually and is #5 nationally. The frozen food industry is the largest sub-industry, surpassing even the state of California by $700 million in frozen food shipments, in which Ohio ships $2.4 billion of frozen food shipments annually. Ohio also ranks 1st out of every state in the United States in frozen food shipments and Ohio's frozen food industry accounts for 20.7% of the United States' frozen food processing.

Several of the world's largest food operating plants are operated in Ohio: the world's largest yogurt processing plant is operated by France-based Groupe Danone in Auglaize County, which announced an $88 million expansion of its facilities in 2011; Campbell's operates the world's largest soup processing plant in Napoleon, Heinz operates the world's single largest ketchup processing plant in Fremont, and General Mills operates the world's largest frozen pizza processing plant in Wellston. Nestle maintains a major presence in Solon employing over 2,000 people in a variety of corporate, technical, and production capacities supporting the local manufacture of Hot Pockets, Lean Pockets, Stouffer's, Lean Cuisine, Buitoni, Nestlé Toll House, Libby's pumpkin and Carnation milk.

Major food processing companies in Ohio include Kroger (Cincinnati), T. Marzetti Company (Columbus), The J.M. Smucker Co. (Orrville), The Iams Company (Cincinnati), Shearer's Foods (Massillon), Sunny Delight Beverages (Cincinnati), and Givaudan (Cincinnati). The Boston Beer Company and Jim Beam Brands has operations in Cincinnati. Mane SA, a $1.2 billion processor of flavors and fragrances headquartered in France, maintains their US headquarters and major manufacturing presence in Milford. Wyandot Snacks, based in Marion, and Rudolph Foods of Lima, are major family-owned players in the snack space. Pierre's Ice Cream, headquartered in Cleveland, recently underwent an $8 million, 35,000-square-foot (3,300 m^{2}) facility expansion of their operations.

Other food processing sub-industries that Ohio is prominent in include pet food (8.4% of the nation's pet food, ranking in 2nd), ketchup and dressings (7.6% of the nation's ketchup and dressing production, ranking 2nd), cookies and crackers (9.9% of the nation's production, ranking 4th), and soft drinks (6.2% of the nation's production, ranking 4th). The county with the most food processing facilities is Hamilton County, followed by Franklin County and Stark County.

Alpine Cheese in Winesburg is the only manufacturer in the Western Hemisphere of Norwegian Jarlsberg cheese. In October 2010, Coca-Cola announced a $120 million expansion of their existing facilities in Columbus.

==== Eateries ====
Major eateries headquartered in Ohio include Bob Evans Restaurants and White Castle (Columbus) and Wendy's (Dublin). Buffalo Wild Wings was founded in Columbus in 1982. The first Arby's was located in Boardman. Charley's Grilled Subs is headquartered in Columbus. Perkins Restaurant and Bakery was founded in Cincinnati. TravelCenters of America, which is the second-largest truck stop chain in the country, is headquartered in Westlake. It is also a Fortune 500 company.

Toledo-based Marco's Pizza was named the fastest growing pizza brand in 2023 and now boasts over 1,100 locations in the United States, with 200 more in development.

==== Wineries and fine dining ====
Through 2008, the state was home to 124 wineries, up from 75 in 1999, producing 4108 employment positions. The industry generated $458 million in revenues and $124 million in wages. 2.2 million visitors toured Ohio's wineries during that year, while the state ranked No. 11 nationally in production and #9 in grape production. Notables include Lake Erie Wineries, Debonne Vineyards, and Ferrante Winery and Ristorante.

Cameron Mitchell Restaurants is headquartered in Columbus.

=== Information ===
Ohio-native Thomas Edison helped contribute to the modern communications world through many of his inventions, including his stock ticker, Kinetoscope, phonograph, and his contributions to the telegraph. Ohio resident Granville Woods invented the telegraph, which he sold to the American Bell Telephone Company.

Ohio is in the 1st quintile in the information industry, in terms of establishments for the information industry. In 2002, Ohio had reached 4,143 establishments, which are 3% of the United States' information establishments. Information establishments include printing and publishing establishments, broadcasting establishments, and telecommunications establishments. The Ohio Supercomputer Center is one of the largest supercomputer facilities in the country.

As of 2002, there were approximately 106,754 workers in Ohio working in the information industry. The total industry ranks 8th out of all 50 states in the number of establishments, and 9th in the number of paid workers, which was 106,754 in 2002.

A prime sector in Ohio's information industry is the broadcasting sector. The broadcasting sector ranks 9th out of all 50 states in the number of establishments, which is 1,954, 11th in number of paid workers, and 11th to its contribution to Ohio's gross state product, which is $6.6 billion.

==== Telecommunications, data, and information technology ====
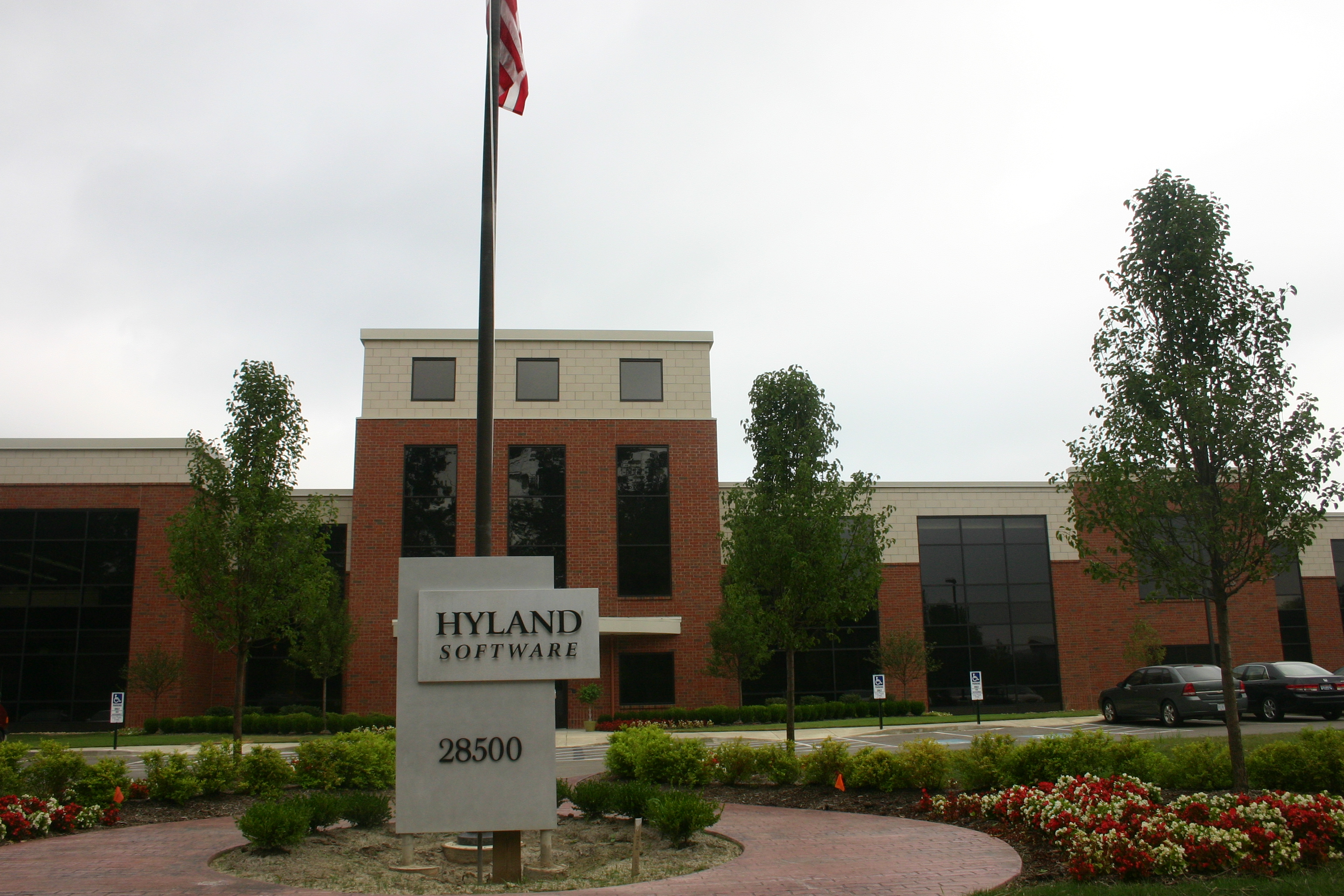
Hyland Software, headquartered in Westlake, is the developer of the enterprise content management software OnBase.

In the second half of 2010, telecommunications companies announced $540 million in investments and projects in the state, to result in over 20,000 new employment positions.

Major telecommunication employers with headquarters in the state include Cincinnati Bell, Ohio Bell, a subsidiary of AT&T in Cleveland; Ohio Telecom in Port Clinton, RACO Industries in Blue Ash, First Communications in Akron, and Horizon Telcom, Inc. in Chillicothe. Companies with operations in the state include L-3 Communications, Time Warner, AT&T, Verizon, Sprint, SBA Networks, Collabera Inc., Cavalier Telephone, Waveland Communications, Embarq, Open Range Communications, Russell Cellular, and Windstream Communications. Frontier Communications in 2010 announced $150 million in investment in the state to upgrade systems and high-speed internet services.

Although since overshadowed by Silicon Valley, Ohio played a major role in the development of the American information technology sector during the 1960s. Dayton was the birthplace of LexisNexis, the first successful computer-assisted legal research service. The Ohio Computer Library Center transformed into the Online Computer Library Center as it expanded to serve libraries around the world; today, it goes by the name OCLC and is still based in Dublin.

Today, Miamisburg-based Teradata is the world's largest data warehousing and enterprise analytics company, and Richfield-based OEConnection is the world's largest online automotive parts exchange, or OPSX. One Call Now, headquartered in Troy, is the nation's largest information notification service and part of INC Magazine's fastest-growing companies list three years in a row, while OneCommand, headquartered in Mason, is an integrated, automated and personalized communications firm.

Hyland Software is located in Cleveland and employs 1100+. India-based Tata Group operates an information center in Reno, while a software consultancy subsidiary Tata Consultancy Services located in Milford recently won a Workforce One Investment Board of Southwest Investing in People Award. Virginia-based Computer Sciences Corporation has operations in Dayton, and Zethus Software is located in Youngstown.

Convergys Corporation, the largest holder of outsourced SAP licenses in the world, is headquartered in Cincinnati. Dublin-based Glomark-Governan is active in Enterprise Value Creation systems. QC Software is headquartered in Cincinnati and a provider of Tier 1 warehouse control systems. Hilliard-based Redemtech, a division of Micro Center, is involved in technology change management. Veeam Software is located in Dublin, and TOA Technologies is active in cloud computing-based mobile workforce management and based in Ohio's "Silicon Suburb" of Beachwood.

In July 2010, AT&T announced the construction of a $120 million data center in Akron, their 9th facility dedicated to such for the eastern seaboard of the United States, which was followed by the announcement in August of the construction of a $20 million Involta data facility, also in Akron, which will be constructed to meet LEED certification.

In October 2010, South Korea-based Nautilus Hyosung, an ATM manufacturer, began operating their global software headquarters in Miamisburg. In December 2010, France-based Alcatel-Lucent announced a $20.2 million project to move existing operations in Columbus to a new 60,000-square-foot (5,600 m^{2}) facility in the city, followed by New Jersey-based Zycus, a software company, which announced in January 2011 it was opening offices in the state.

Diebold, the world's third largest ATM manufacturer, announced in 2011 it would construct a new $100 million headquarters in the Akron/Canton area.

==== Publishing ====
A main sector of the industry is the publishing sector. It ranks 9th out of all states in the number of establishments, which is 1,015, 10th in the number of employees, and 13th in its contribution to the gross state product. McGraw-Hill operates a division in Columbus, Brown Publishing Company distributes over 70 publications throughout the state, and was recently sold to Ohio Community Media; American Legal Publishing Corporation, headquartered in Cincinnati, codifies ordinances for 1,800 cities and counties, and Knight-Ridder has its roots in Akron, although now headquartered in California.

Block Communications, located in Toledo, owns major newspapers such as the Pittsburgh Post-Gazette, as well as numerous television stations and networks from Idaho to Illinois. The E.W. Scripps Company, headquartered in Cincinnati, is a major American media company with newspapers from Florida, Texas, to California, and owns television stations located in markets from Baltimore to Phoenix.

=== Legal ===
Ohio is home to some major legal firms, including Jones Day and Squire Patton Boggs, headquartered in Cleveland. The state is also home to some of the United States' largest firms, including Baker Hostetler in Cleveland, Taft Stettinius & Hollister, Frost Brown Todd, and Dinsmore & Shohl in Cincinnati, and Vorys, Sater, Seymour and Pease in Columbus.

=== Retail ===
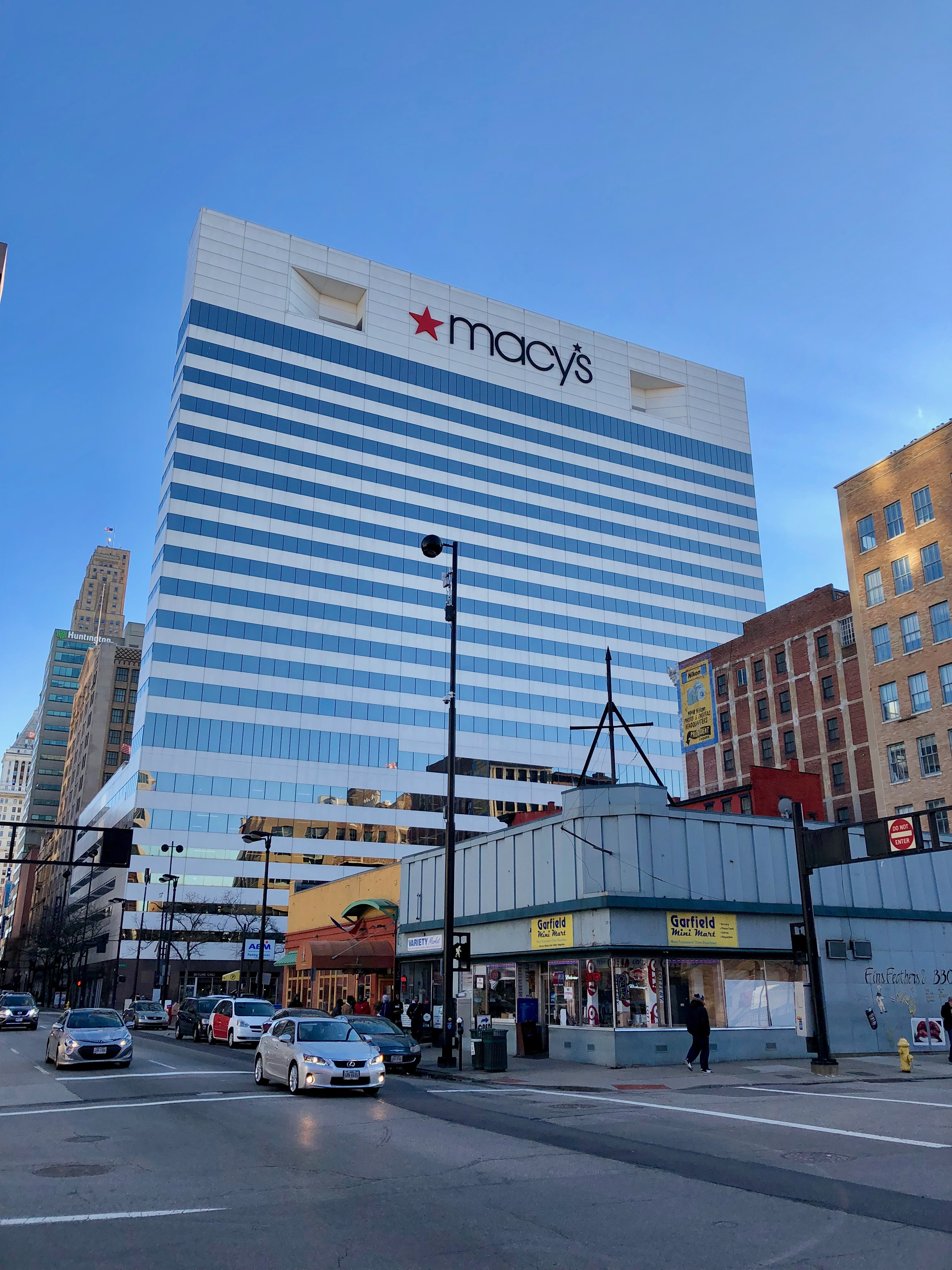
Macy's moved its headquarters to Cincinnati after it merged with Federated Department Stores in 1994.

Ohio is home to major retailers such as Macy's, Luxottica, Abercrombie & Fitch Co., Limited Brands, Victoria's Secret, Pink (Victoria's Secret), Bath & Body Works, Express, Big Lots, Inc., Value City, Tween Brands, Lane Bryant and DSW. Lululemon Athletica, Gap, Inc, Eddie Bauer and JCPenney also have major distribution centers in Columbus.

=== Tourism ===
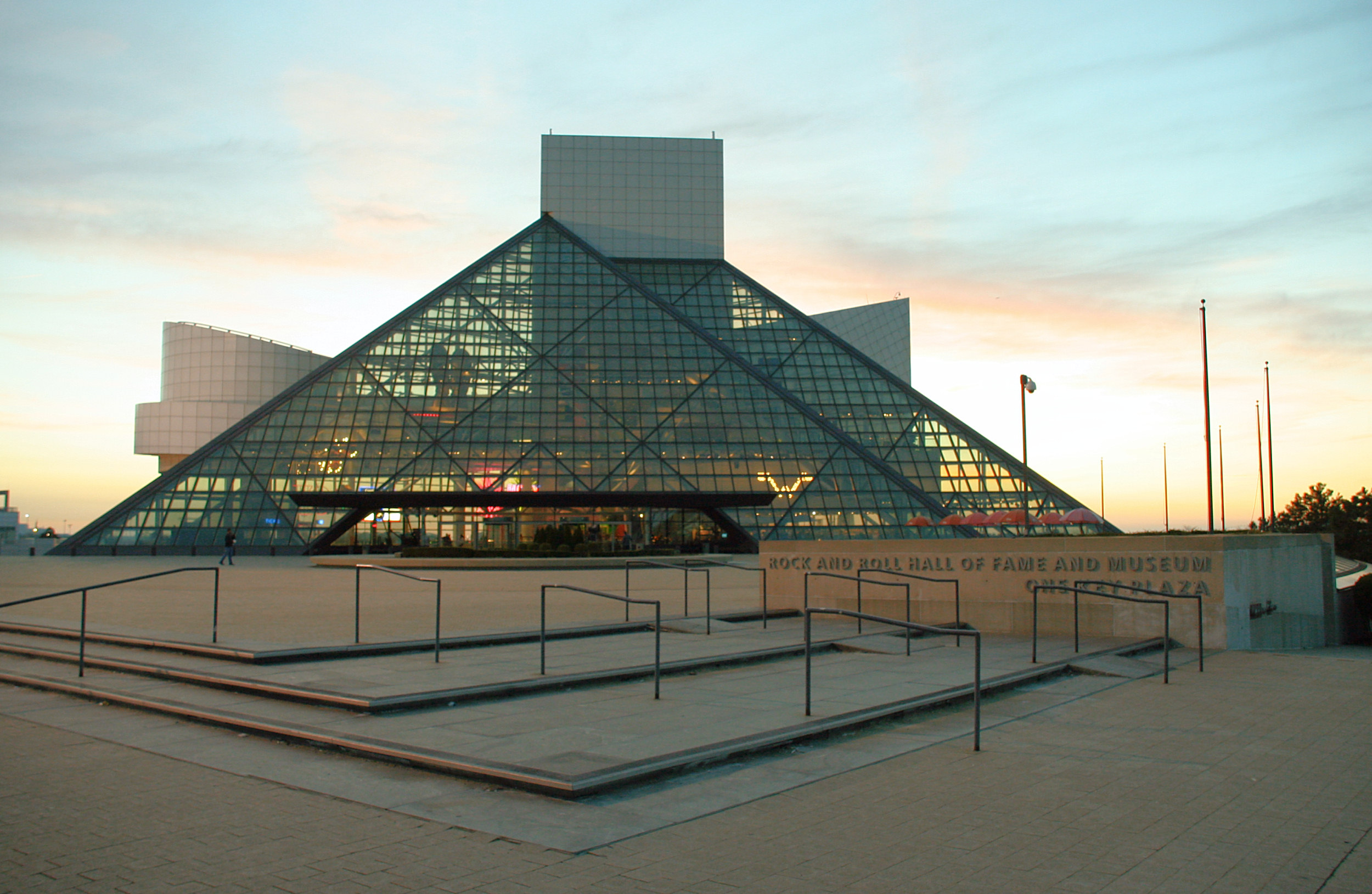
The Rock and Roll Hall of Fame is a well-visited tourist attraction in Cleveland. This is one of many tourist attractions that help make up Ohio's diverse tourism industry.

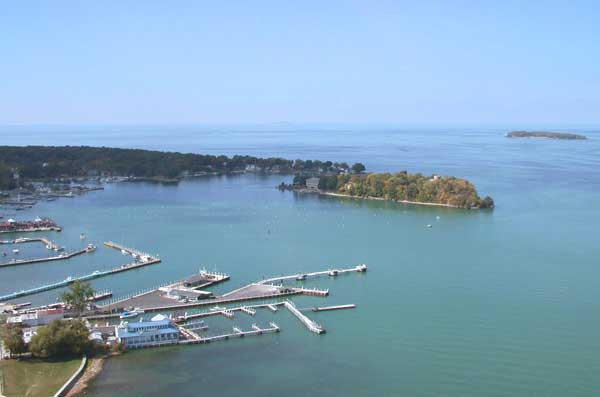
Put-in-bay, located on the Bass Islands in Lake Erie, attracts international tourism.

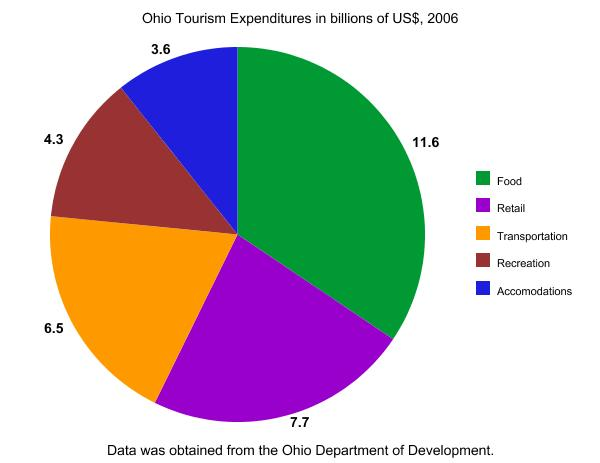
Ohio tourism expenditures by category. About 34.4% of the expenditures were on food, making food the highest of all Ohio tourism expenditures.

In 2009 voters approved a ballot initiative allowing the construction of four new casinos in the state. Thirty months later Horseshoe Casino Cleveland, developed by Rock Gaming LLC and Caesars Entertainment Corporation, became Ohio's first casino, when it opened on May 14, 2012. Hollywood Toledo, developed and operated by Penn National Gaming, opened 2 weeks later on May 29 followed by Hollywood Columbus, which opened on October 8, 2012. Horseshoe Cincinnati is expected to be the state's fourth and final full-service casino when it opens on March 4, 2013.

Ohio has two of the largest amusement parks in North America: Cedar Point in Sandusky and Kings Island in Mason. Other major attractions include the Rock and Roll Hall of Fame in Cleveland; the Pro Football Hall of Fame in Canton; the Bass Islands near Sandusky; the National Museum of the United States Air Force, the world's largest and oldest military aviation museum located in Dayton; The Wilds, one of the world's largest conservation centers located in Cumberland; the Columbus Zoo and Aquarium; Lake Erie; and the annual Arnold Sports Festival in Columbus. Other notable attractions include the Toledo Museum of Art, the National McKinley Birthplace Memorial in Niles, the Egypt Valley Wildlife Area in Belmont County, the Stan Hywet Hall and Gardens in Akron, the Cincinnati Zoo and Botanical Garden, the Great Lakes Science Center in Cleveland, the Center of Science and Industry in Columbus, the Boonshoft Museum of Discovery in Dayton, the 125 historic covered bridges located throughout the state and the Great Serpent Mound in Adams County.

Toledo has been home to the National Museum of the Great Lakes since 2014. Docked at the museum, on the right bank of the Maumee River, is the Col. James M. Schoonmaker, a 617 ft. long museum ship that was once the largest freighter on the Great Lakes.

Notable hospitality venues include the Ritz-Carlton and InterContinental Suites in Cleveland, Westin's The Great Southern Hotel and the Hyatt Regency in Columbus, and The Cincinnatian Hotel in Cincinnati.

=== Film ===
The motion picture industry has had a steady presence in the state for decades. Production companies include Hemlock Films, Tri-C, Access Video, Creative Technology, Second Story Productions, and Shadetree Films in the Cleveland area; Media Magic Productions, which includes an Emmy-winning producer, and Classic Worldwide Productions in the Toledo area; BCB Productions, Mills James, one of the nation's largest independent production companies, I'AMedia, Arginate Studios, Media Source, and Ascension 7 Films in the Columbus area; and Bright Light Productions, J. Cage Productions, and Panoptic Media in the southwestern Ohio area. Studios and sound stages include RISE Studios and CSI Production Concepts in Cincinnati, Cleveland Audio Visual, and Gaiam Inc. in West Chester.

Since the Ohio Film Tax Credit was signed in July 2009, twelve projects have received approval with a combined budget of $76.4 million through spring 2011. The legislation makes eligible projects over $300,000 in production costs to receive up to 25% reimbursement up to $5 million and 35% for locally employing. The legislation resulted in 9 movies filmed or planned in northeast Ohio alone in 2010, resulting $9.46 million in wages for 3700 local employees, with an economic impact of $24.3 million for local businesses. In 2010 expenditures on film in the state were estimated to total over $31 million, filming in locations that include Akron and Cincinnati also. In 2011, Marvel Studios announced it would be filming portions of The Avengers in the Cleveland area, the largest film production in state history.

Other films that went into production in 2011 included Boot Tracks starring Stephen Dorff, Confession starring Danny Glover and Melissa Leo, The Yank starring Fred Willard, and the film adaptation of I, Alex Cross. The video game Galaxy Command is also slated for production. These productions will contribute to a further $17.1 million economic impact on the state.

Academy Award-winning films with production in Ohio have included Terms of Endearment, The Silence of the Lambs, The Deer Hunter, Rain Man, and Traffic. Other notable films include Air Force One, Men in Black, Shawshank Redemption, The Rainmaker, The Soloist, Eight Men Out, Tango and Cash, Major League, Spider-Man 3, A Christmas Story, and Happy Gilmore.

=== Oil and natural gas ===
Ohio is in the early stages of the development and exploration of the Utica-Point Pleasant deposits in Ohio with more than 1,000 wells drilled. The hydraulic fracturing process enables energy companies to tap into shale deposits to extract oil, natural gas, natural gas liquids, and condensate.

Ohio is home to four major oil refineries, with two located in Oregon and one each in Lima and Canton. These facilities represented nearly 600,000 barrels per day of refining capacity as of 2018.

== Personal income ==
Ohio had an estimated $575 billion in total personal income in 2018. The mean household income for the top 5% in the state is $296,000.

According to the Bureau of Labor Statistics in 2018, the mean wage for Ohioans was $48,220. The highest paid professionals in the state were concentrated in the medical fields. Anesthesiologists, with average mean wage of $285,000, were the highest paid, followed by surgeons at $267,680, obstetricians and gynecologists at $255,560, orthodontists at $228,420, general internists at $219,910, and all other physicians at $212,160. Average mean wage for other selected professionals include chief executive officers at $201,100, computer and information research scientists at $135,510, financial managers at $135,610, postsecondary health specialty teachers at $130,280, human resource managers at $123,680, industrial production managers at $109,190, nurse practitioners at $101,970, and police officers at $61,040.

The state of Ohio's residents in 2017 had an overall $45,615 per capita personal income, up from $36,360 in 2010. Ohio's per capita income is 29th in the US and is 91% of the national average.

== Housing ==
According to the United States Census Bureau, there are an estimated 5,045,356 houses in Ohio, of which 4,499,506, or about 89.2% are estimated to be occupied; this is 0.8% above the national average rate of occupation. Houses with a mortgage are estimated to cost owners about $1,216 per month, which is $186 below the national average. The United States Census Bureau also estimates that 3,150,239 houses are owner-occupied, or about 70%, which is 2.7% above the national average, and that an estimated 1,349,267 houses are renter-occupied. The median house value is $135,200, which is a significant $50,000 below the national average. Also, there are an estimated 545,850 unoccupied houses. The highest number of houses in Ohio were built from 1940 to 1959 (1,175,325 houses), and that 3,058,721 houses are in some way dependent on utility gas.

In late 2009, the average home value in Cleveland was $139,900, Cincinnati $149,900, and Columbus $164,900. Clear Capital's Home Data Index in July 2009 showed that Cleveland, Columbus and Cincinnati led the nation in home value increases, up 19.6, 15.6 and 12.9 percent. The top five counties through November 2006 for average listing price were Geauga County at $388,822, Ottawa County at $314,786, Union County at $306,872, Warren County at $267,236, and Hamilton County at $237,965.

Some historians suggest Ohio is the birthplace of public housing, having submitted the first application for such to the Public Works Administration in 1933. The state was also the first to establish a local public housing authority. Ernest J. Bohn, a Romanian immigrant to Cleveland, is credited as a pioneer in public housing.

=== Homelessness ===
Homelessness in Ohio has increased in recent years. In 2024, the state experienced a 3% rise in the homeless population, with certain areas having a larger increase. For example: Columbus and Franklin County reported a 7.4% increase in 2025. All three major cities in Ohio saw increases in homelessness in 2023, in part due to housing shortages. Recent reports have ranked Ohio among the top 10 states with the largest total homeless populations, and a 2023 analysis similarly identified it as having a high number of people experiencing homelessness.

Despite the high total numbers, Ohio's per capita homelessness rate remains closer to the national average. In 2024, the rate was estimated at 9.66 per 10,000 residents, compared to the national rate of 22.7 per 10,000.

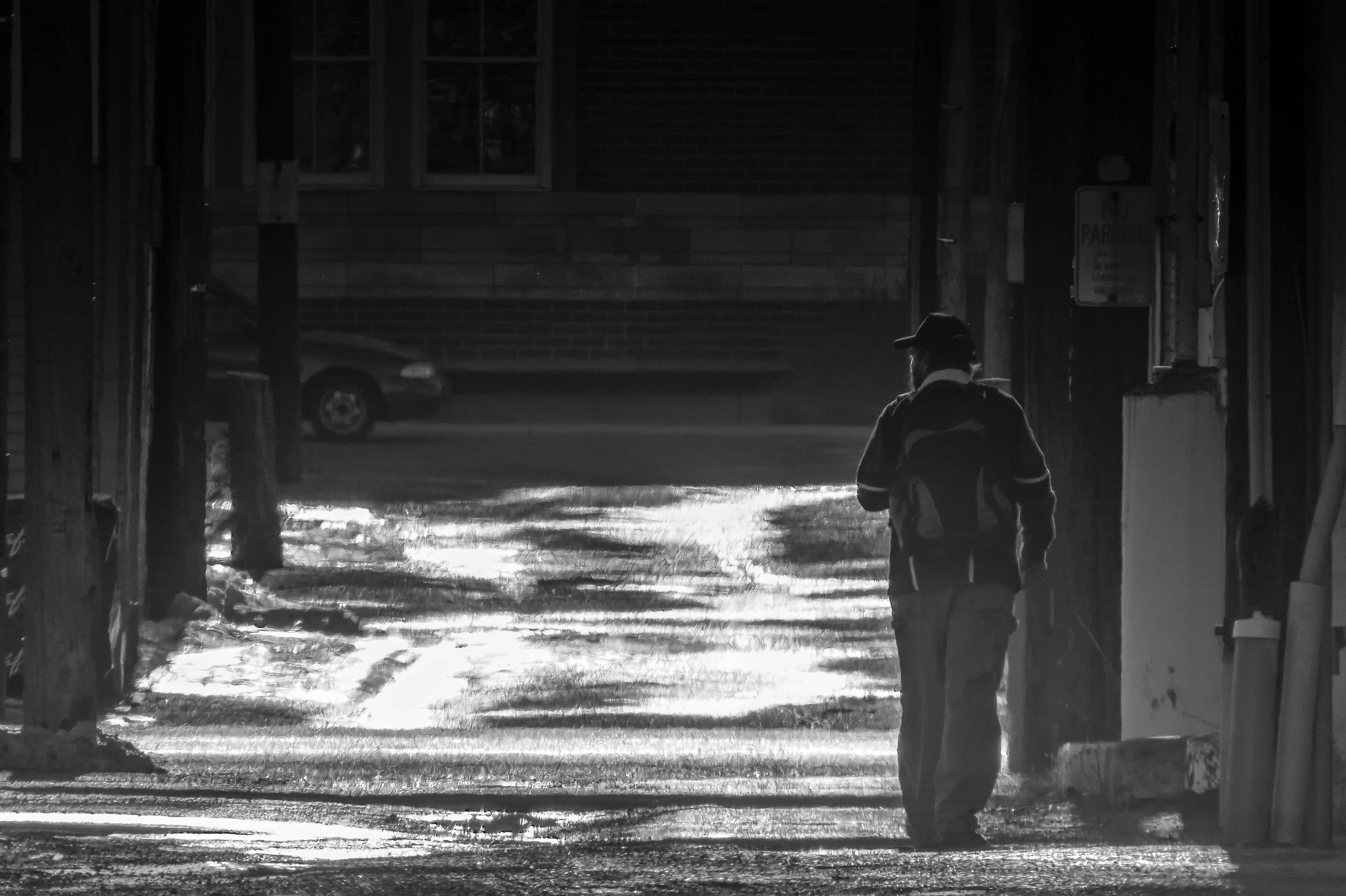
A man walking down alley in Newark, Ohio

The 2022 Annual Homelessness Assessment Report (AHAR) from the U.S. Department of Housing and Urban Development estimated that 10,654 Ohioans experienced homelessness that year, with over 80% being sheltered. This group included 3,214 people in families with children, 703 unaccompanied youth, 633 veterans, and 1,023 chronically homeless individuals. Although the statewide rate had remained relatively stable in prior years, the 2022 population still represented a 5.4% decrease from 2007. Since 2007, Ohio also saw the fourth-largest decrease in chronic homelessness among states, with 1,285 individuals or 55.7% of that group exiting chronic homelessness during that time.

In contrast to national stereotypes, a 1986 study of nearly 1,000 homeless individuals in Ohio found that many had strong local ties: 65% had lived in the same county for at least a year or were born there, and 87% had previously held a job. A quarter of those surveyed were employed at the time of the study.

== Taxation ==
A 2014 report by the Quantitative Economics and Statistics Practices (QUEST) of Ernst & Young in conjunction with the Council On State Taxation (COST), ranks Ohio as third in the nation for friendliest tax environment. The study, "Competitiveness of state and local business taxes on new investment," provides a state-by-state comparison of tax liabilities. The top five states ranked with the lowest effective tax rate on new investment are: (1) Maine (3.0%); (2) Oregon (3.8%); (3) Ohio (4.4%); (4) Wisconsin (4.5%); and (5) Illinois (4.6%).

The rate has been steadily declining since the 2005 tax reform, dropping from $11,506.20 + 7.5% of excess over $200,000 in 2004 to $8,671.63 + 5.421% of excess over $208,500 in 2013. Ohio has replaced its corporate income tax with a gross receipts tax called the Commercial Activity Tax (CAT). Businesses with annual taxable gross receipts of more than $150,000 are subject to an annual minimum CAT of $150. Businesses with annual taxable gross receipts in excess of $1 million are subject to the annual minimum CAT of $150 plus apply a CAT effective rate of .26% on receipts above $1 million on a quarterly basis (with a $250,000 quarterly exclusion). Ohio is #24 in average property taxes at 3.016% of personal income, but the taxes vary by city and district. The state is #29 in overall average percentage of income used for sales, excise, and gross receipt taxes at 3.234%.

Below are the simple personal income tax rates for Ohio:

Income range	Tax rate per dollar earned
$0–$26050	$0
$26050–$100000	$360.69 + 2.75% of excess over $26,050
More than $100000	$2,394.32 + 3.5% of excess over $100,000

== See also ==
- Great Lakes Megalopolis
