= Air Force Metrology and Calibration Program Office =

Metrology provider for the U.S. Air Force

- Part of Central Ohio Aerospace & Technology Center
- Near Heath, Ohio in the United States
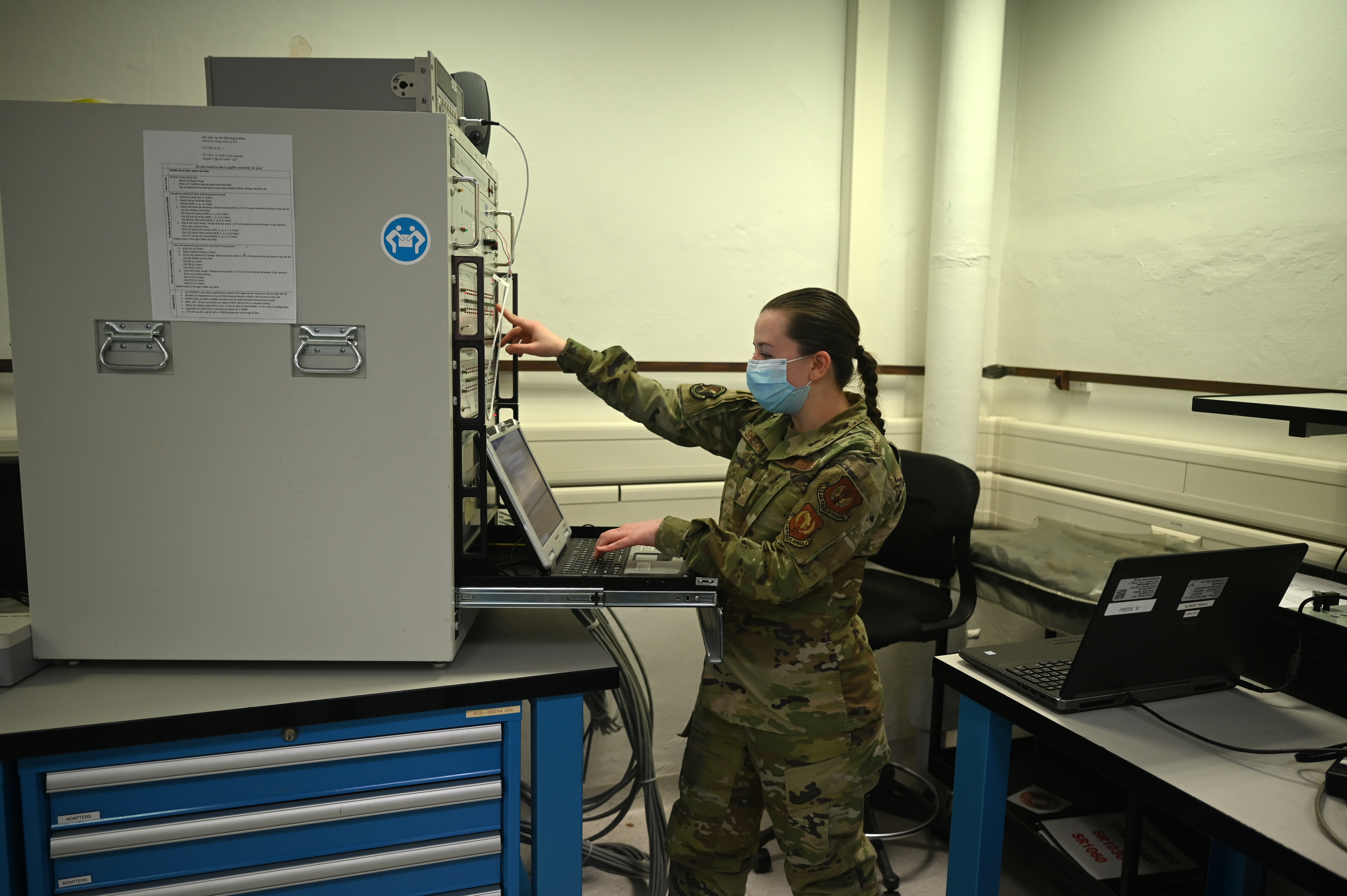
- A USAF calibration technician runs a calibration test

Site information
- Type: Program office
- Owner: Department of Defense
- Operator: US Air Force
- Controlled by: Air Force Materiel Command
- Condition: Operational
- Website: Official website

Location
- Coordinates: 40°01′13″N 82°28′23″W

AFMETCAL (Air Force METrology and CALibration Program Office), located in Heath, Ohio is the primary manager of metrology services for the U.S. Air Force. It retains engineering authority for all calibrations performed in the PMEL labs throughout the Air Force, and oversees the contractor managed and operated Air Force Primary Standards Lab (AFPSL). It currently operates as a direct reporting unit of the Air Force Life Cycle Management Center for Wright-Patterson AFB, Wright-Patterson, OH.

== Mission ==
To develop and sustain precision measurement capabilities ensuring accurate, reliable, and safe air and space systems performance through effective management of the Air Force Metrology Program.

== History ==
The United States Air Force calibration program was initiated in January 1952 to comply with AF Regulation 74–2, which outlined policies and assigned responsibilities for managing the Air Force Metrology and Calibration (AFMETCAL) Program. The Dayton Air Force Depot, located at Gentile Air Force Station, Dayton, Ohio, developed and implemented a plan to ensure traceability to national standards that would apply to all measurements made on any weapon system in the Air Force.

The Dayton Air Force Depot was given the authority to establish a centralized calibration program. Under their plan, the Air Materiel Area Depots were given a set of measurement standards, which were periodically calibrated by the Dayton Air Force Depot using standards traceable to the National Bureau of Standards.

The operational success of a "Test Shop" program set up at March AFB, California, on 15 September 1957, led to the establishment of the base-level Precision Measurement Equipment Laboratories providing the Air Force with a complete calibration system that could handle the increasingly stringent measurement needs of the new missile and aircraft systems. The Dayton Air Force Depot facilities were becoming inadequate to support the increasing accuracy requirements of the Air Force so the search for a suitable replacement facility was begun in 1958. Air Force Industrial Plant No. 48 at Heath, Ohio, contained most of the features desired, such as the underground facilities and a stable seismic environment. On 1 February 1959, it was redesignated the Heath Maintenance Annex of the Dayton Air Force Depot. Authorization to begin construction was given by public law on 9 June 1960.

The Dayton Air Force Depot personnel associated with the Air Force calibration program began their moves to the Heath Maintenance Annex in April 1962, and by June, most had been relocated to Heath, Ohio. In June, the name was also changed to the 2802nd Inertial Guidance and Calibration Group under HQ Air Force Logisitics Command. By July 1962, the Metrology function was fully staffed. By the end of 1962, the primary calibration labs and the Air Force Measurement Standards Laboratories were completed, consisting of four levels underground containing 20,000 square feet (1900 m^{2}) of laboratory area. In November 1962, the facility was named Newark Air Force Station.

In 1965, the Air Force assigned management of the worldwide Precision Measurement Equipment Laboratories certification program to the Calibration and Metrology Division. In 1968, the 2802nd Inertial Guidance and Calibration Group was inactivated and replaced by the Aerospace Guidance and Metrology Center (AGMC). The Calibration and Metrology Division was changed to the Directorate of Metrology on 8 November 1968. Newark Air Force Station was renamed Newark Air Force Base in June 1987.

During the 1990s privatization took place at Newark AFB. This has resulted in the functions of the Air Force Primary Standards Laboratories, and Technical Order preparation, being performed by a private contractor. The Air Force created the Air Force Metrology and Calibration Program Office (AFMETCAL) at Heath, Ohio, to manage metrology services for the Air Force, retain engineering authority for all calibrations performed in the PMEL labs throughout the Air Force, and manage the contractor operated Air Force Primary Standards Lab. This is the present configuration of the Air Force Metrology program.

== Notes ==
- Newark Air Force Base was the first base to be targeted by BRAC for privatization. The base was originally targeted for closure. When it was discovered the work there could not be done elsewhere it was only then they tried privatization to correct the BRAC Commissions failure of fact finding.
- AFMETCAL and the AFPSL are located at the Central Ohio Aerospace and Technology Center (COATC), also known as "The Base," on land leased from the Heath-Newark-Licking County Port Authority.

== See also ==
- List of United States Air Force installations
