= Egypt Valley Wildlife Area =

Wildlife preserve in Ohio

Coordinates: 40°06′58″N 81°07′03″W

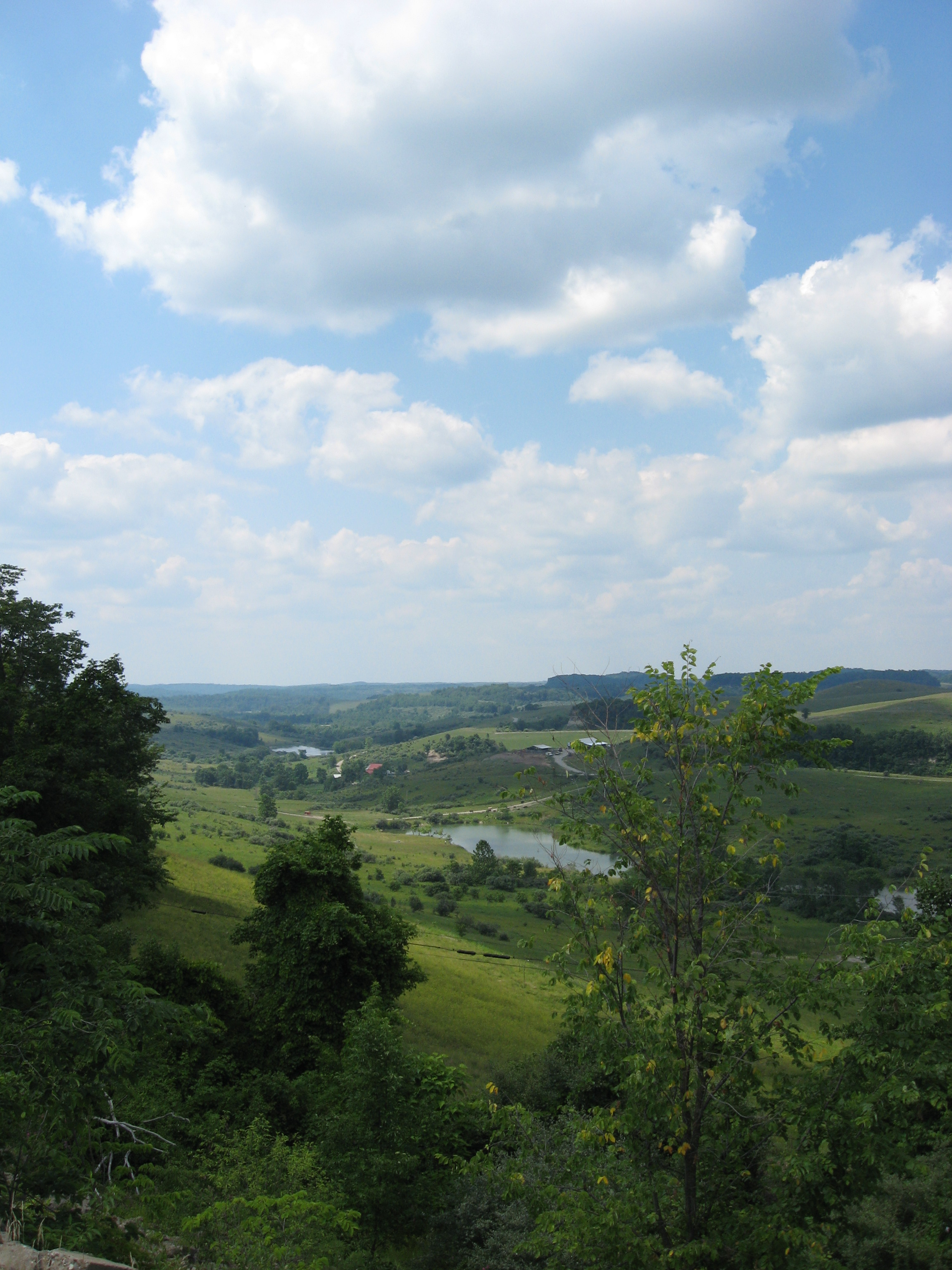
- Egypt Valley Wildlife Area
- Interactive map of Egypt Valley Wildlife Area
- Location: Belmont County, Ohio, United States
- Area: 14,300 acres (58 km^{2})
- Established: 1994
- Governing body: Ohio Department of Natural Resources Division of Wildlife
- Website: Egypt Valley Wildlife Area

The Egypt Valley Wildlife Area is a 14,300 acres (5,800 ha) former surface mining area in northwestern Belmont County Ohio, United States. Since the mid-1990s, the Ohio Department of Natural Resources has administered the area. For many years, local residents have fished, hunted, camped and explored the high walls, backwaters, and graveyards that make up this area. People, to a lesser extent, call the area Egypt Bottom.

The area encompasses the northwest corner of Belmont County. Morristown and Hendrysburg are on the southern edges of the area, while Holloway and Flushing are on the northern edge of the area. The southern end of Piedmont Lake, the opposite end of the dam in Piedmont, juts into the northern pocket of the area as well.

== Coal mining ==
Before the area became a sporting destination, it was surface-mined. Egypt Valley was home to some of the largest earth moving machines, most notably the GEM of Egypt, and the less known Mountaineer. The high walls and unique look to the area was the end-result of this mining method. Most coal extraction ceased in the early 1990s.

== Folklore ==
Aside from the coal mining in the area, Egypt Valley is known for its rich tradition of local folklore. The Salem Cemetery, located in the middle of the area, is home to the grave of Louiza Fox, who was murdered in 1869. Her murderer, Thomas Carr, was the first person hanged in Belmont County.

Louiza Fox was a thirteen-year-old girl working as a servant for Alex Hunter, the owner of a coal mine. Thomas Carr, 22 years old, worked for Hunter at his mine.

During this time, Carr came into contact with the child and began to stalk her, relentlessly begging her and her father for her hand in marriage. He was repeatedly denied by both as not only was Louiza too young, her father recognized that the man was quite peculiar and had little income or motivation to provide for a wife. Carr became instantly angry upon hearing this news and plotted the murder of the child.

Carr waited behind a fence on a path that Fox frequently traveled. When the girl went for a walk with her brother, Carr met up with them and sent her brother back home. Carr then slit the throat of his love and stabbed her fourteen times. He then threw her in a ditch and fled the scene.

Fox's brother, who watched the entire thing, informed his parents immediately. The family sent out a search party and eventually found Thomas Carr with wounds from his suicide attempt. He attempted to slit his throat and shoot himself in the head, but failed and was taken into custody and nursed back to health.

Several days after the murder, Carr admitted to killing Fox, along with thirteen other people and laughed at his sentencing, saying “he did not care a damn if it was to be tomorrow.”

Louiza was buried in Salem cemetery, where there have been reports of the girl weeping at her grave. She and Carr both are said roam the land of Egypt Valley and also have been seen at the site of Louiza's murder.

== Hunting and fishing ==
Egypt Valley, a popular regional outdoor destination, offers many small, mainly isolated, strip pit ponds, creeks, and backwaters to explore, hunt, and fish.
