= MesoCoat =

- Headquarters: Euclid, Ohio, U.S.
- Products: nanocomposite metal and ceramic coating
- Website: www.mesocoat.com

MesoCoat, Inc. is a Euclid, Ohio-based equity-backed company providing metal protection and repair. MesoCoat develops and provides wear and corrosion solutions using surface engineering technologies, serving Oil and Gas, Aerospace, Energy, Infrastructure, and other markets.

== History ==
MesoCoat was spun out of advanced materials company Powdermet, Inc. in 2007 to be an independent firm. One of the core technologies acquired and licensed for MesoCoat's start-up phase was developed at the Department Of Energy's Oak Ridge National Laboratory.

In 2009, Abakan, Inc. acquired a controlling interest in MesoCoat.

In 2011, MesoCoat signed a cooperation agreement with Petrobras to help verify the effectiveness of the CermaClad™ process and finance an Euclid plant.

In 2015, Abakan, Inc. acquired 100% of MesoCoat, Inc.

Mesocoat was put into receivership in 2015 by U.S. Federal Court Judge Denise Cote of the Southern District of New York. Judge Cote appointed Robert W. Seiden as Receiver who steered the company to settlement of a dispute with its creditors and resolved a litigation.

== Technology ==
MesoCoat synthesizes and assembles non-oxide ceramic matrix component nanoparticles into coating solutions. Its coatings provide wear and corrosion protection to metallic surfaces.

== Operations ==
MesoCoat is owned by an investment group.

Since 2007, MesoCoat has funded its primary research and development activities through government grants, third-party licensing arrangements, and venture and equity financing.

== Facilities ==
MesoCoat broke ground on its first commercial plant in Euclid, Ohio in 2011. The plant is forecast to begin production in early 2013.

== Awards ==
MesoCoat CermaClad™ and related processes

Year	Organization	Honor
2004	R&D Magazine	R&D 100
2011	R&D Magazine	R&D 100
	Forbes	#50, America's Most Promising Companies
2012	Wall Street Journal	#1 Manufacturing Company, Technology Innovation Awards
	Nortech	Nortech Innovation Awards

MesoCoat PComP™ and related processes

Year	Organization	Honor
2000	R&D Magazine	R&D 100
2012	R&D Magazine	R&D 100

MesoCoat ZComP™ and related processes

Year	Organization	Honor
2007	R&D Magazine	R&D 100
