= Hale crater =

Hale crater may refer to:

- Hale (lunar crater), a crater on the Moon
- Hale (Martian crater), a crater on Mars
