= Hédervári (crater) =

Crater on the Moon

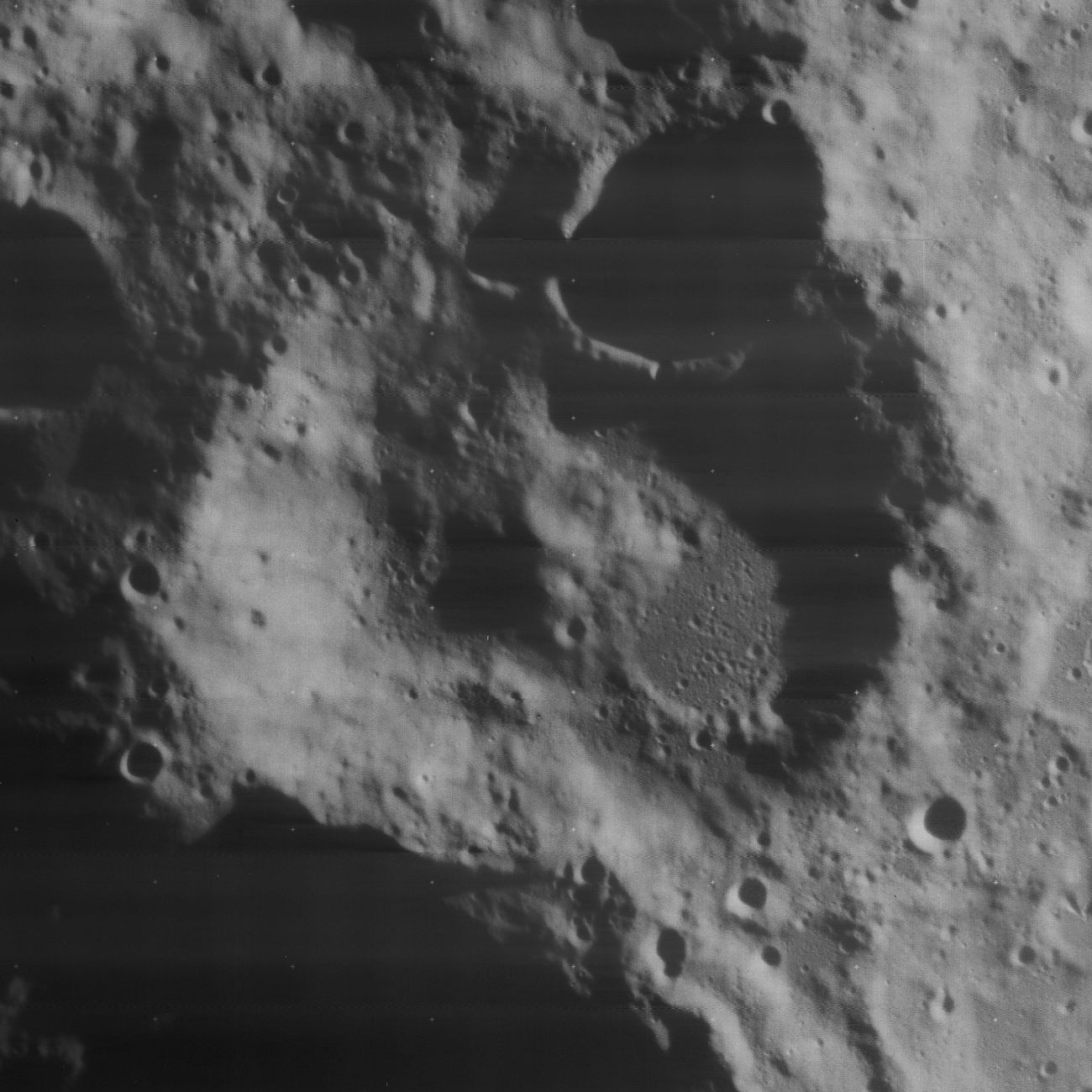
- Lunar Orbiter 4 image
- Coordinates: 81.8°S 84.0°E
- Diameter: 69 km
- Depth: Unknown
- Colongitude: 290° at sunrise
- Eponym: Péter Hédervári

Hédervári is a lunar impact crater that is located in the southern part of the Moon, only a few crater diameters from the south lunar pole. It is attached to the northern rim of the larger crater Amundsen, and lies south of Hale. Due to its location, this crater is viewed nearly from the edge from Earth, which hinders the amount of detail that can be observed. It is also illuminated obliquely by the Sun, and the interior is often cloaked in shadows.

This is an eroded crater with a rough and irregular outer rim. The smaller crater Amundsen C lies across the northern rim, as well as the inner wall and part of the interior floor. The outer rampart of Amundsen covers the southern part of the inner wall. The interior floor is rough in places, particularly in the western half. The eastern floor is more level and featureless. There is a mount of rough ground about the midpoint.

This feature was previously identified as Amundsen A before being assigned a name by the IAU after Péter Hédervári, a Hungarian astronomer.

== See also ==
- Amundsen (crater)
- Hale (lunar crater)
