= Harry Wexler =

American meteorologist

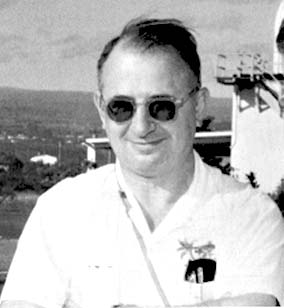
- Born: March 15, 1911; Fall River
- Died: August 11, 1962 (aged 51); Boston
- Alma mater: Harvard University; Massachusetts Institute of Technology
- Occupation: Meteorologist
- Employer: United States Weather Bureau (1934–1962); United States Army Air Forces (1942–1946)
- Spouse(s): Hannah Paipert Wexler
- Awards: Carl-Gustaf Rossby Research Medal (1963)

Harry Wexler (March 15, 1911 – August 11, 1962) was an American meteorologist, born in Fall River, Massachusetts.

== Biography ==
Wexler attended Harvard University, and in 1939 he was awarded a Ph.D. in meteorology under Carl-Gustaf Rossby from the Massachusetts Institute of Technology.

He worked for the United States Weather Bureau from 1934 until 1942, then served as a Captain to a Lieutenant Colonel with the weather service of the Army Air Corps during World War II from 1942 until 1946. On September 14, 1944, Major Harry Wexler became the first scientist to deliberately fly into a hurricane. He accompanied a flight of a Douglas A-20 "Havoc" that flew into the hurricane to collect scientific data.

In 1946 he returned to the U.S. Weather Bureau, becoming Chief of the Scientific Services division. As head researcher, Wexler encouraged a study into the atmospheres of planets other than the Earth. He is particularly noted for his work on the use of satellites for meteorological purposes, the development of the TIROS-1—the world's first weather satellite. Science fiction author and futurist, Arthur C. Clarke, had been following Wexler's work on hurricanes in the 40s and wrote to Wexler to ask for his thoughts on Clarke's idea of using an artificial satellite to study weather patterns from space. This put Wexler on a path that would eventually lead to the launch of TIROS-1 in 1960. He also studied the use of computers for weather prediction and modification. He was instrumental in finding funds and support for the measurement and study of carbon dioxide in the atmosphere initiated by Roger Revelle and Charles David Keeling, key work for drawing attention to the problem of global warming.

He was chief scientist for a U.S. expedition to the Antarctic for the International Geophysical Year in 1958.

In 1958 he was concerned that atom bomb testing may lead to a new ice age from a nuclear winter scenario.

From 1959 until 1961 he proposed and promoted the idea of a World Weather Watch. In 1961 he served as the lead negotiator for the U.S. in talks with the U.S.S.R. concerning the joint use of meteorological satellites.

He continued working at the bureau until his death in 1962. Wexler had been researching the link connecting chlorine and bromine compounds to the destruction of the stratospheric ozone layers, but died of a heart attack while on vacation in Woods Hole, Massachusetts. Wexler had already accepted an invitation to deliver a lecture entitled "The Climate of Earth and Its Modifications" at the University of Maryland Space Research and Technology Institute. Another twelve years would pass before the first papers about the effect of chlorofluorocarbons on the ozone layer were published in 1974, during which CFC production had increased "Had Wexler lived to publish his ideas", author James Rodger Fleming would observe later, "they would certainly have been noticed and could have led to a different outcome and perhaps an earlier coordinated response to the issue of stratospheric ozone depletion."

He was survived by his wife Hannah, and her daughters Susan and Libby. His wife donated his papers to the Library of Congress in 1963.

== Honors ==
The crater Wexler on the Moon is named after him. Volume 91, issues 10-12 of the Monthly Weather Review were published as memorial issues for Wexler. In 1977, the University of Wisconsin–Madison founded the Harry Wexler Professorship of Meteorology.
