= Charles B. Atwood =

American architect

Charles Bowler Atwood
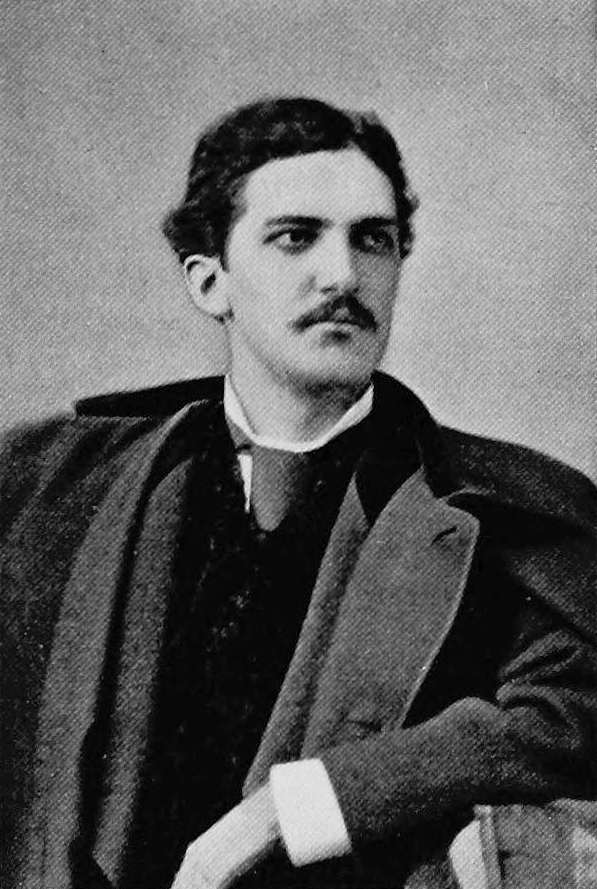
- Portrait of Charles B. Atwood, date unknown
- Born: 1849; Charlestown, Massachusetts
- Died: 1895 (aged 45–46)
- Education: Lawrence Scientific School at Harvard University
- Occupation: Architect
- Employer(s): Ware & Van Brunt

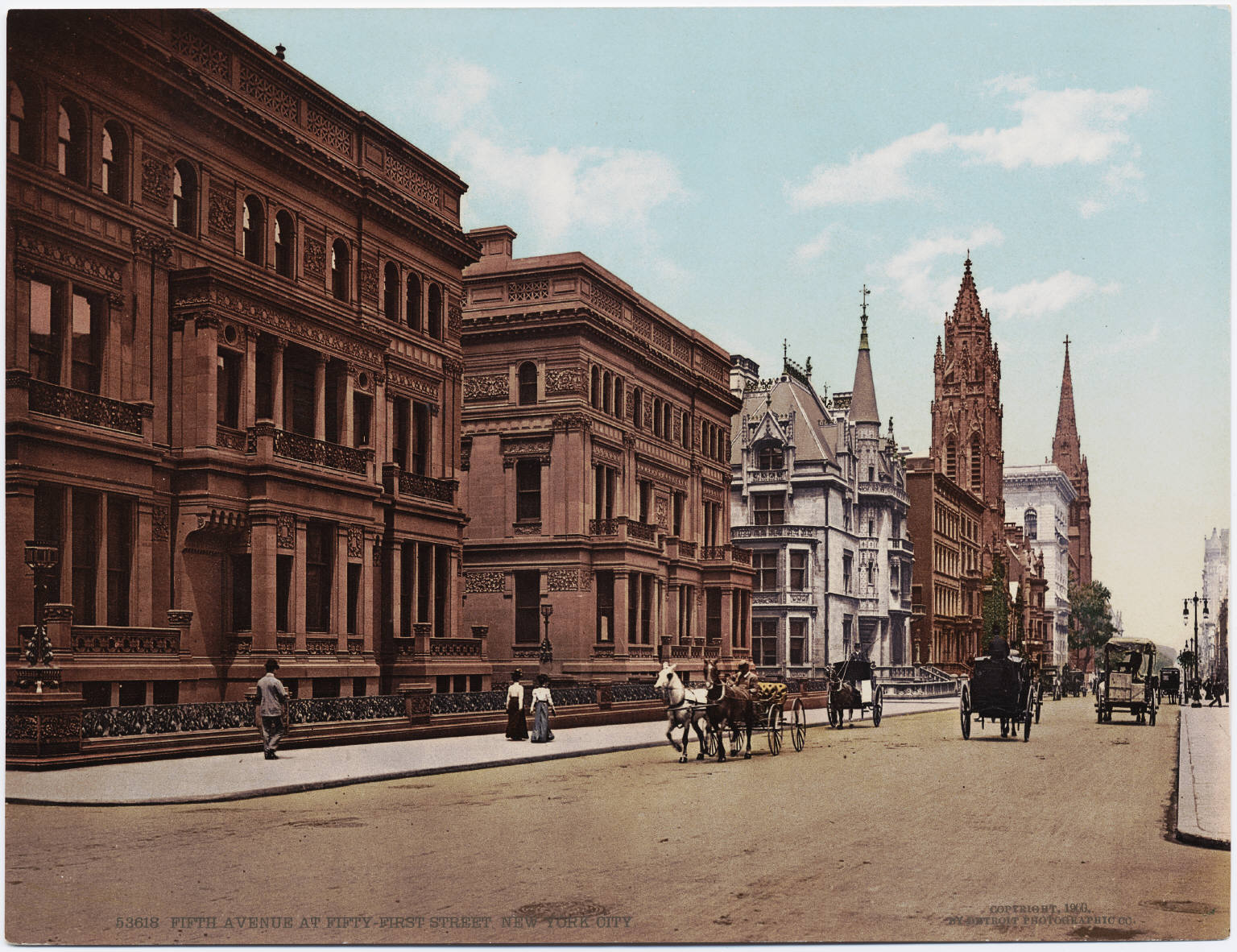
W. H. Vanderbilt house (foreground) on New York City's Fifth Avenue. It was designed by Herter Brothers and Charles Atwood, architects

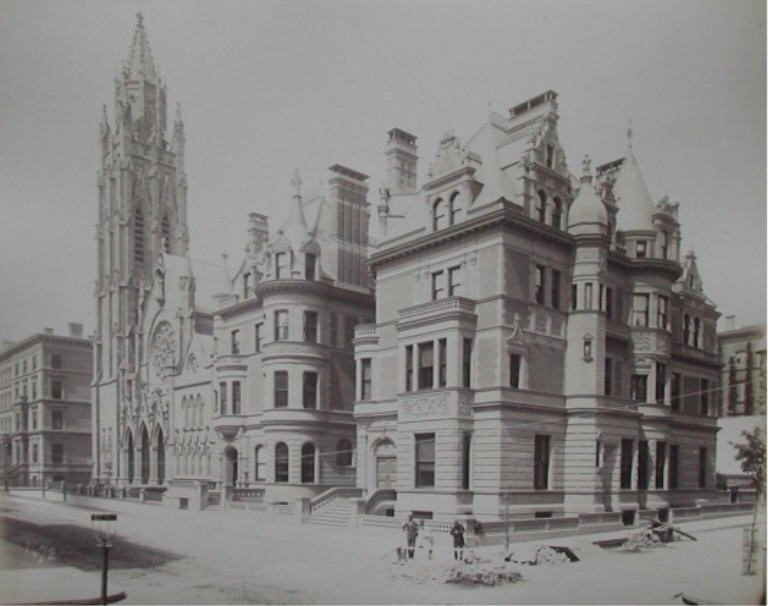
From L'Architecture Americaine by Albert Levy. 1885. 5th Avenue at the 54th Street, New York. Requested by William H. Vanderbilt for his daughter.

Charles Bowler Atwood (1849–1895) was an architect who designed several buildings and a large number of secondary structures for the 1893 World's Columbian Exposition in Chicago. He also designed a number of notable buildings in the city of Chicago.

== Early life ==
Atwood was born in Charlestown, Massachusetts in 1849. He attended the Lawrence Scientific School at Harvard University.

== Professional training ==
Atwood trained in the office of Ware & Van Brunt in Boston, where he quickly made a name for himself as a skilled draftsman and designer.

== Designs ==
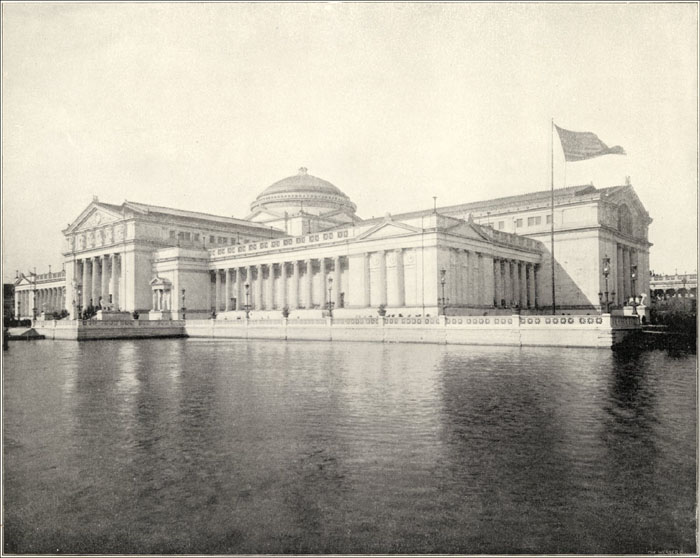
The Palace of the Fine Arts, designed by Atwood for the World's Columbian Exposition

The buildings Atwood designed for the Columbian Exposition included the Terminal Station and the Fine Arts Building. The latter building is the only structure built on the grounds of the Columbian Exposition which still stands in its original location. It houses Chicago's Museum of Science and Industry.

Atwood also designed several other buildings in Chicago, as a member of Daniel Burnham's staff. These include the Reliance Building, and the Marshall Field and Company Building.

== Selected works ==
- Old State Mutual Building, Worcester, Massachusetts, 1870
- Holyoke City Hall, Holyoke, Massachusetts, 1871; partial, H. F. Kilburn completed design in 1874
- Marshall Field and Company Building, Chicago, 1891; partially designed
- Palace of Fine Arts, Chicago, 1893; for World's Columbian Exposition
- Reliance Building, Chicago, 1895; finished work of John Root
- Fisher Building, Chicago, 1895
- Ellicott Square Building, Buffalo, New York, 1895
