= Földtani Közlöny =

Geology journal

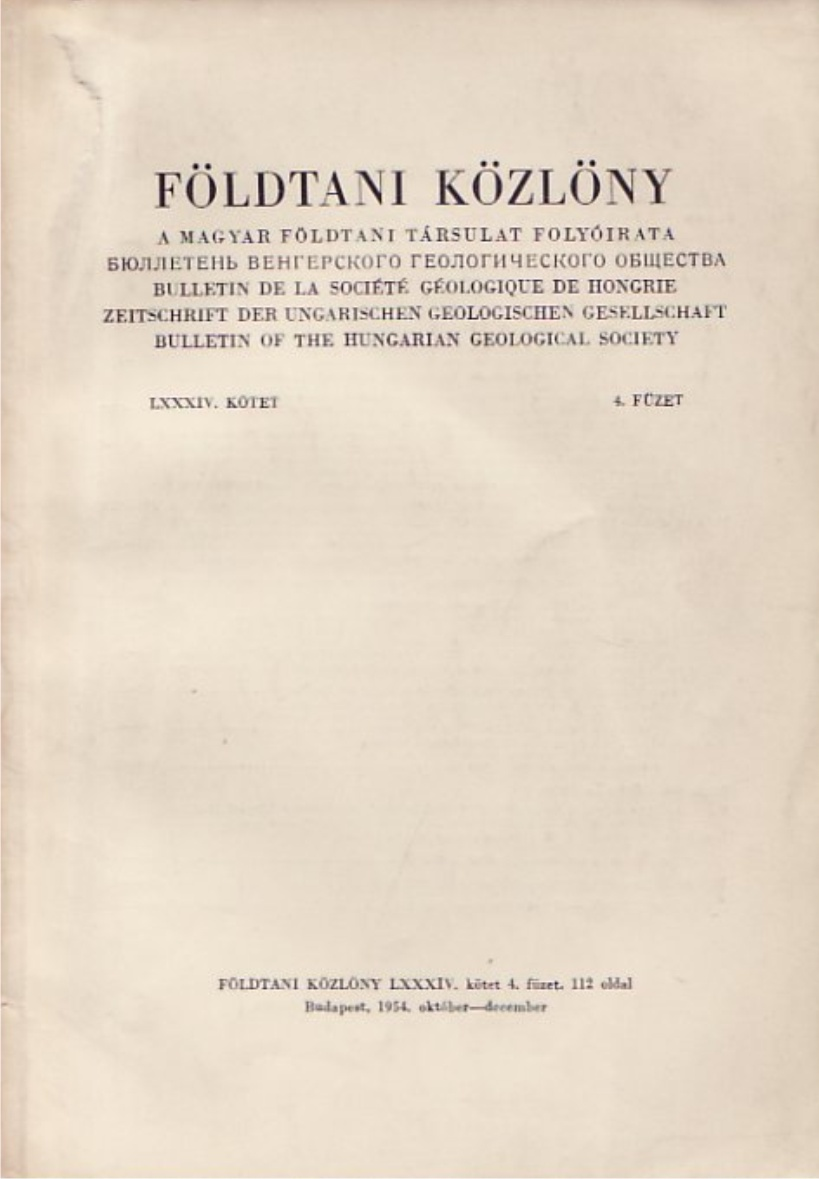
- Discipline: Geology
- Language: English
- Edited by: Dr Orsolya Sztanó

Publication details
- History: 1871–present
- Publisher: Hungarian Geological Society (Hungary)
- Open access: Yes

Standard abbreviations
- ISO 4: Földt. Közlöny

Indexing
- CODEN: FOKOA9
- ISSN: 0015-542X (print); 2559-902X (web)
- LCCN: sn85005736
- OCLC no.: 1569510

Links
- Journal homepage

Földtani Közlöny, otherwise known in English as the Bulletin of the Hungarian Geological Society, is a peer-reviewed open access scholarly journal publishing research articles on or related to the geology and stratigraphy of the Carpathian-Pannonian region. It is the official journal of the Hungarian Geological Society (Magyarhoni Földtani Társulat), made available online with the help of the Library of the Hungarian Academy of Sciences (MTAK). Published articles are written in English or Hungarian. It converted to an open access journal in 2017. The current editor-in-chief is Dr Orsolya Sztanó.

== Notable scientists who have published in this journal ==
- Austro-Hungarian-born geologist and paleontologist Franz Nopcsa von Felső-Szilvás
- Hungarian geologist Péter Hédervári
- Hungarian geologist, paleontologist, paleoanthropologist and Széchenyi Prize winner, Miklós Kretzoi

== Biological taxa first described in this journal ==
- An extinct bear genus Agriarctos was first described in this journal in 1942.
- A fossil barnacle species Megabalanus giganteum was first described in this journal in 1949.
- A fossil barnacle species Balanus vadaszi was first described in this journal in 1949.
- A fossil barnacle species Balanus borsodensis was first described in this journal in 1952.

== Abstracting and indexing ==
The journal is abstracted and indexed in:

- GeoRef
- Scopus
- Zoological Record
