= Albert Lévy (photographer) =

French photographer (1847–1931)

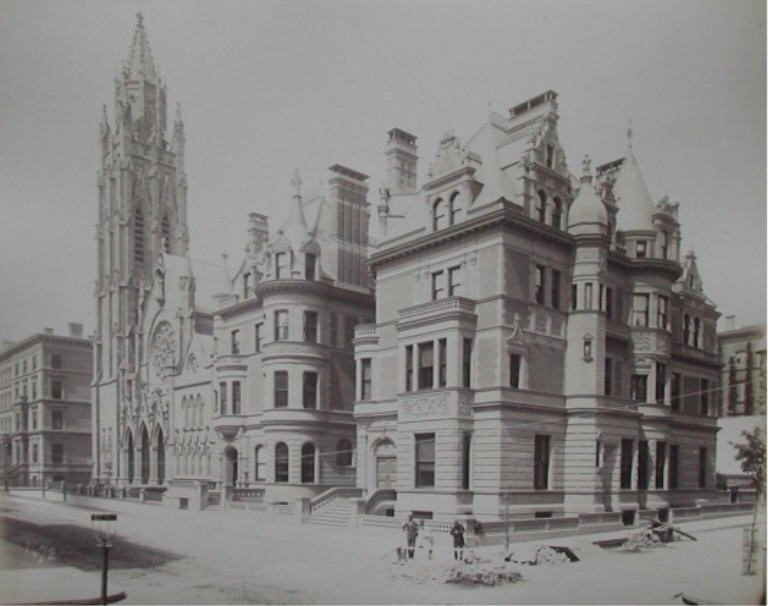
From L'Architecture Americaine. 1885. 5th Avenue at the 54th Street, New York. Built by William H. Vanderbilt's for his daughter. Architect C.B. Atwood.

Albert Levy (1847–1931) was a French photographer active in Europe and the United States. Mostly active in the 1870s and 1890s in the United States, returning to France in 1896, he was a pioneer on architectural photography.

He developed a catalogue with 2500 titles that is available through the Gallica web project of the Bibliothèque nationale de France (BnF) as well as in the Avery Architectural and Fine Arts Library. His catalogue covers France, Italy, Germany, United Kingdom, Austria, the Netherlands, Switzerland and the United States. He was one of the first photographers to have studios on both sides of the Atlantic Ocean: in Paris and New York.

His main contribution to history documentation was his "Albert Levy's architectural photographic Series" in the 1870s that consists of albums with 30–40 albumen prints of the Architecture of the United States, with a size of 20x24 cm approximately. There are at least 36 series.

== Biography ==
Levy was born in Paris in 1847 and died in Asnières-sur-Seine. However, the 1880 United States census notes that he was 33 years old, which would put his birth date at 1847 if he was asked his "age on your birthday anniversary in 1880". Alternatively, it could be either 1846 or 1847 if asked for his age at the time of being asked (which could be before or after his birthday anniversary in 1880). The New York Passengers list 1820–1957 indicates that he came to the United States in 1876 and that his occupation was photographer. The 1880 Census gives his profession as bookseller.

== Occupation ==
There are indications that Albert Levy was a photographer who also worked variously as bookseller, editor, and manufacturer. His main occupation was photographer. Active between 1870s-1890s, he worked in France in 1876 and in the United States in the 1880s and 1890s. He was one of the few photographers to have two studios at the same time in America and Europe. Actually, he had several studios:

- 77 University Place, New York
- 4 Bond Street, New York in 1880
- 34 1/2 Pine Street, New York in 1887
- 19 rue de la Chaussée-d'Antin, Paris
- 22 janvier 1901, A. Lévy, 4 av. Pinel, Asnières

Apart from photographer and bookseller, he was also pioneer in the manufacture of the gelatin dry plates in 1878. Because of the work he developed, he was an early competitor of George Eastman. He published several ads on "The Philadelphia Photographer" before Eastman's patent (1879):

- Levy's Emulsion Photographique Francaise Advertisement.

[...] Unequalled for rapidity (fully equal to the both plate) intensity to any degree on simple development without silver or other intensifier and absolutely permanent and without change. Albert Levy sole proprietor. Preservative for dry plates (more rapid than wet) [...]

- Levy's Dry Plates
- Levy's Cyanotipes.
- Levy's Emulsion Dry Plate Camera.

Finally, he was an editor whose catalogue is in the Bibliothèque nationale de France(BnF) and in the Avery Architectural and Fine Arts Library.

== Photography ==
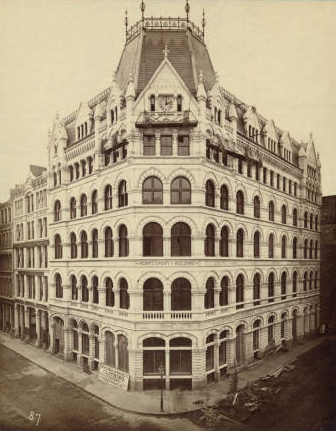
Montgomery Building, Boston by Cummings and Sears

The main occupation of Albert Levy was Architectural photography. He developed most of his work in the 1870s. He started working in Europe and then he moved to the United States when he was 33 years old, but he still worked in Europe. His catalogue of 1887 (with 2500 titles) demonstrates that he did architectural photography in France, Italy, Germany, United Kingdom, Austria, the Netherlands, Switzerland and the United States. The took albumen photographies that collected with the following standards:

- Albumen 20x24 cm
- Cardboard 29x41 cm
- Albums with 30-40 photos each

He focused his work on the new buildings of important architects like:

- Herter Brothers - Twin Houses, New York
- Richard Morris Hunt - William Kissam Vanderbilt Residence, New York
- George Browne Post - Cornelius Vanderbilt Residence, New York
- Henry Hobson Richardson - Oakes Ames Memorial Library, North Easton, Massachusetts
- Calvert Vaux - Samuel J. Tilden Residence, New York
- Charles B. Atwood - Dr. Stewart Webb and H. McKinley Twombly residences, New York (originally for William Henry Vanderbilt)
- C. Pfeifer - The Berkshires, New York
- E. H. Kendall - Odgen Goelet residence, New York
- R.H.Robertson
- Peabody and Stearns
- Viollet le Duc
- William Le Baron Jenney
- Guerinot

Important owners of the buildings he took photos are William Henry Vanderbilt, Cornelius Vanderbilt, William Kissam Vanderbilt, Samuel J. Tilden, Oliver Ames, John Harjés.

His most important contribution to history consists on the "Albert Levy's Architectural photographic series" that are a collection of at least 36 albums with 30-40 albumen prints of the architecture of the United States and Europe in the 1870s. In these series there are photos of Washington, Baltimore, Boston, New York, Philadelphia, Albany, Chicago, Cleveland, Buffalo, Detroit, Milwaukee, Zurich, Berna, Berlin and cities of France among others. He used to create the series depending on the type of buildings been photographed. Some of the series are:

- Albert Levy's Photographic Series of Modern American Architecture: First Series, Private City Dwellings.
- Albert Levy's Photographic Series of Modern American Architecture: Second Series, Country Dwellings.
- Albert Levy's Photographic Series of Modern American Architecture: Third series, French Gothic and Renaissance, Civil and Domestic Architecture, New York
- Albert Levy's Photographic Series of Modern American Architecture: Fifth Series, Messrs. Vanderbilt's Mansions
- Albert Levy's Photographic Series of Modern American Architecture: Ninth Series, Street Fronts.
- Albert Levy's Photographic Series of Modern American Architecture: Tenth Series, Sea Shore Cottages and Country Houses
- Albert Levy's Architectural Photographic Series: Twelfth Series, Modern Street Architecture of Berlin, Street Fronts and Apartment Houses.
- Albert Levy's Architectural Photographic Series: Fourteenth Series: Romanesque and Gothic Churches in the South of France
- Albert Levy's Photographic Series of Modern American Architecture: Sixteenth Series, American Private City Dwellings
- Albert Levy's Architectural Photographic Series: Twenty-fourth series, Berne, Lucerne, Zurich and other Swiss cities and towns
- Albert Levy's Photographic Series of Modern American Architecture: Thirty-First Series, Street Fronts, Stores, Office Buildings, Etc.
- Albert Levy's Photographic Series of Modern American Architecture: Thirty-Third series, American City and Country Residences, etc., New York.
- Albert Levy's Photographic Series of Modern American Architecture: Thirty-Fifth Series, Sea Shore Cottages And Country Houses, Bar Harbor, Mount Desert, Maine
- Albert Levy's Photographic Series of Modern American Architecture: Thirty-Sixth Series, Sea-Shore Cottages, Etc., Newport, R.I., And Long Branch, N.J

A selection of this unique archive of Europe's and American Architecture in the 19th century was lately edited by Andre, Daly fils et Cie. (French editors specialized in Architecture) to collect the best of the Albert Levy's architectural series in the album "L'Architecture Americaine" and show it in Europe. This collection consists of 3 series of albums:

- 1st Series: Public Buildings
- 2nd Series: Private Urban Residences
- 3rd Series: Suburban Homes

Each serie has 36 photos. All of them are described in the book "American Victorian Architecture".

He participated in the Centennial International Exhibition of 1876 in Philadelphia

== Artwork holders ==
The main holders of his photos are:

- Architektur Sammlung of the Technische Hochschule in Munich
- Art Institute of Chicago
- Avery Architectural and Fine Arts Library
- Bibliothèque nationale de France(BnF)
- Boston Public Library
- Centre Canadien d'Architecture
- George Eastman House
- J. Paul Getty Museum
- Library of Congress of the United States
- Metropolitan Museum
- Ministère de Culture France
- Santa Barbara Museum of Art
- University of Louisville
- University of Wisconsin–Milwaukee

== Samples ==
Some examples of his work can be found at the HALIC (Historical Architecture and Landscape Image Collection) of the Art Institute of Chicago. Search for "Albert Levy".
