= Wexler (crater) =

Lunar surface depression

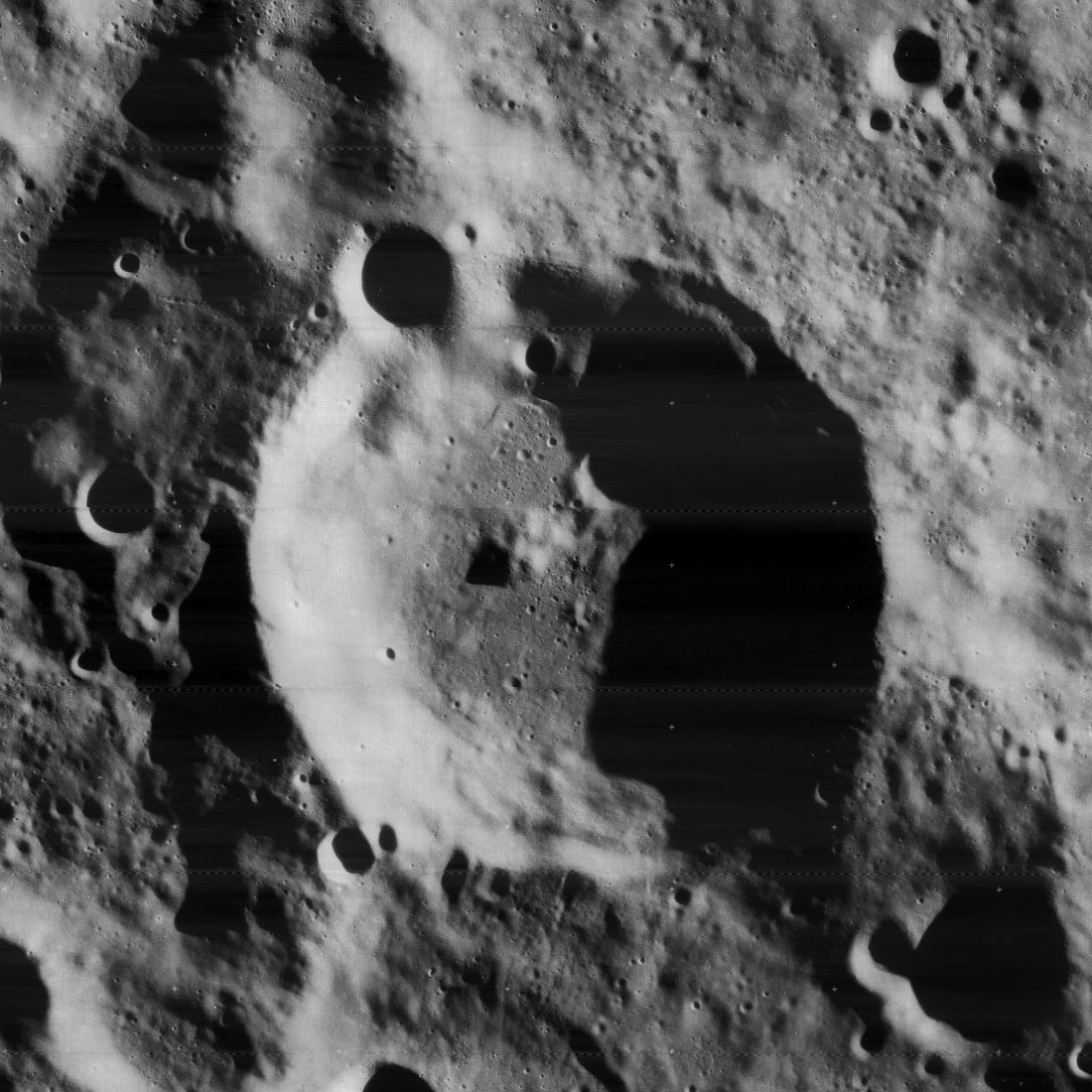
- Lunar Orbiter 4 image
- Coordinates: 69.1°S 90.2°E
- Diameter: 51 km
- Depth: 3.73 km (2.32 mi)
- Colongitude: 272° at sunrise
- Eponym: Harry Wexler

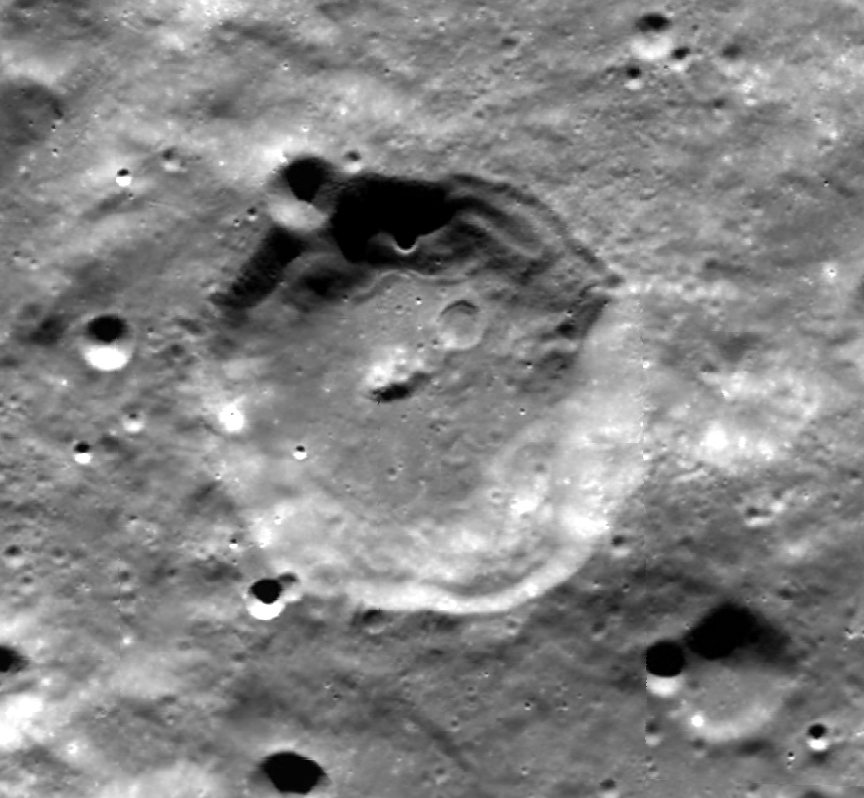
Clementine image

Wexler is a lunar impact crater that lies across the south-southeast limb of the Moon. In this location not much detail about the formation can be discerned from the Earth, and it must be viewed from orbit to see most of the structure. It lies about a hundred kilometers northwards of the larger crater Hale, and south-southeast of Petrov.

The rim of this crater retains much of its original structure, although the features have become softened and worn in comparison to the younger Hale. The rim has a polygonal appearance along most of the perimeter, and traces of terraces can still be seen along sections of the inner wall. There is a small crater across the northwest rim, but otherwise the formation is not significantly marked by impacts. The interior floor is relatively flat and level, with a central peak near the midpoint. There is the ghostly remnant of a crater to the northeast of the middle peak.

Within a half crater diameter to the north and east is a wide, valley-like rift in the surface. The narrow end of this cut is located to the east of Wexler, and from there it follows a nearly straight, widening course to the northeast, before opening wide towards the northwest to the north of Wexler.

This crater is named after American meteorologist Harry Wexler (1911-1962). Its designation was formally adopted by the International Astronomical Union in 1970.

== Satellite craters ==
By convention these features are identified on lunar maps by placing the letter on the side of the crater midpoint that is closest to Wexler.

Wexler	Latitude	Longitude	Diameter
E	68.8° S	95.5° E	23 km
H	70.5° S	96.7° E	14 km
U	68.2° S	82.0° E	51 km
V	68.0° S	83.9° E	21 km
