= Old State Mutual Building =

- U.S. National Register of Historic Places
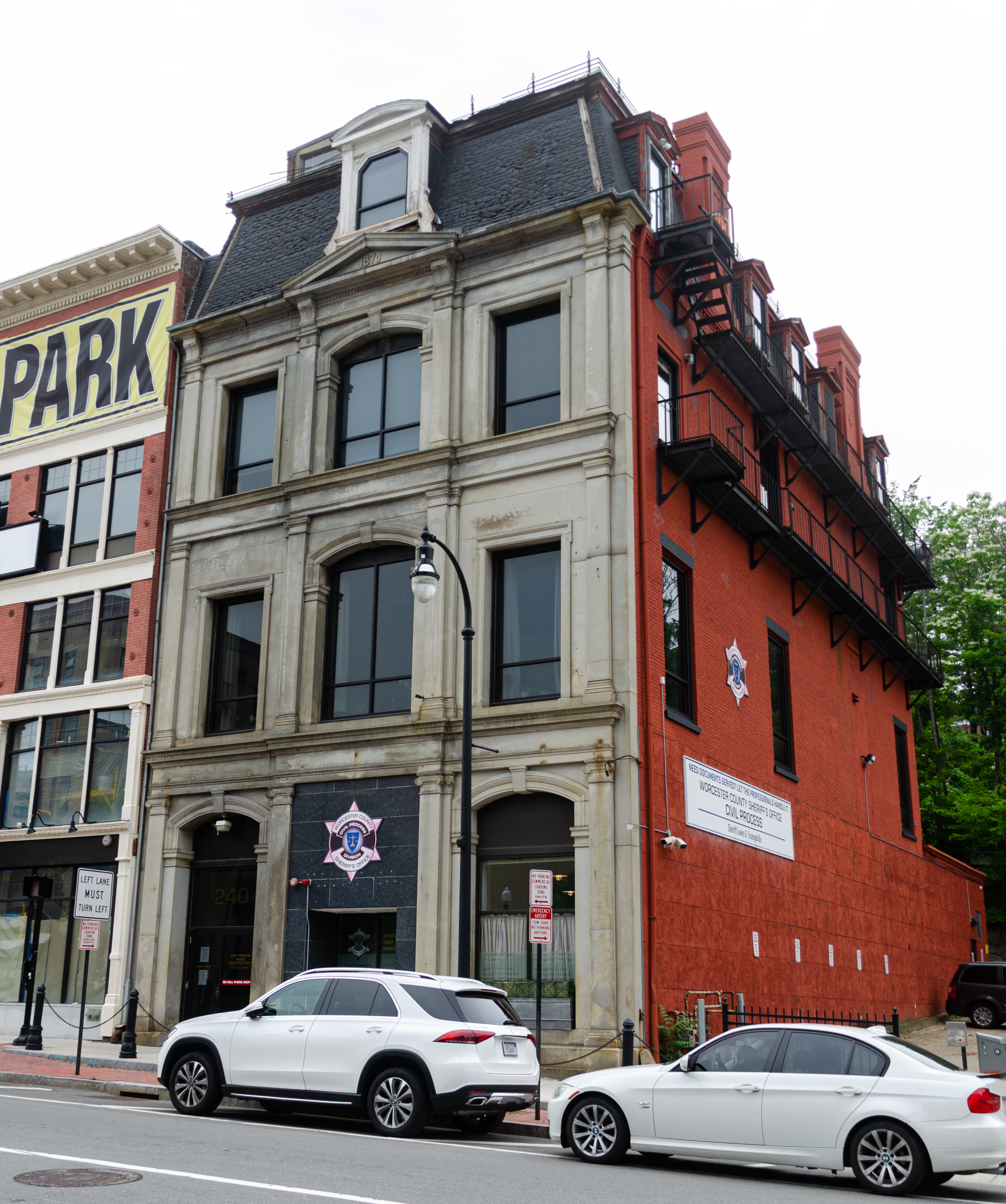
- Old State Mutual Building (2023)

- Location within Massachusetts Location within the United States
- Location: 240 Main St., Worcester, Massachusetts
- Coordinates: 42°16′2″N 71°48′6″W
- Built: 1870
- Architect: Charles B. Atwood
- Architectural style: Second Empire style
- MPS: Worcester MRA
- NRHP reference No.: 80000585
- Added to NRHP: March 5, 1980

The Old State Mutual Building is an historic commercial building at 240 Main Street in Worcester, Massachusetts. It served as the offices of the State Mutual Life Assurance Company from its construction in 1870 until 1897. Designed by Charles B. Atwood, it is one of a few surviving Second Empire commercial buildings in the city. The granite building is four stories high, the last of which is under a mansard roof. It is three window bays wide, with a slightly projecting central bay, which is topped at the third floor by a small pediment. The bays are divided by Ionic pilasters, and the rooftop is crowned by an iron railing.

The building was listed on the National Register of Historic Places in 1980.

== See also ==
- State Mutual Stadium
- National Register of Historic Places listings in northwestern Worcester, Massachusetts
- National Register of Historic Places listings in Worcester County, Massachusetts
