= George Ellery Hale =

American solar astronomer (1868–1938)

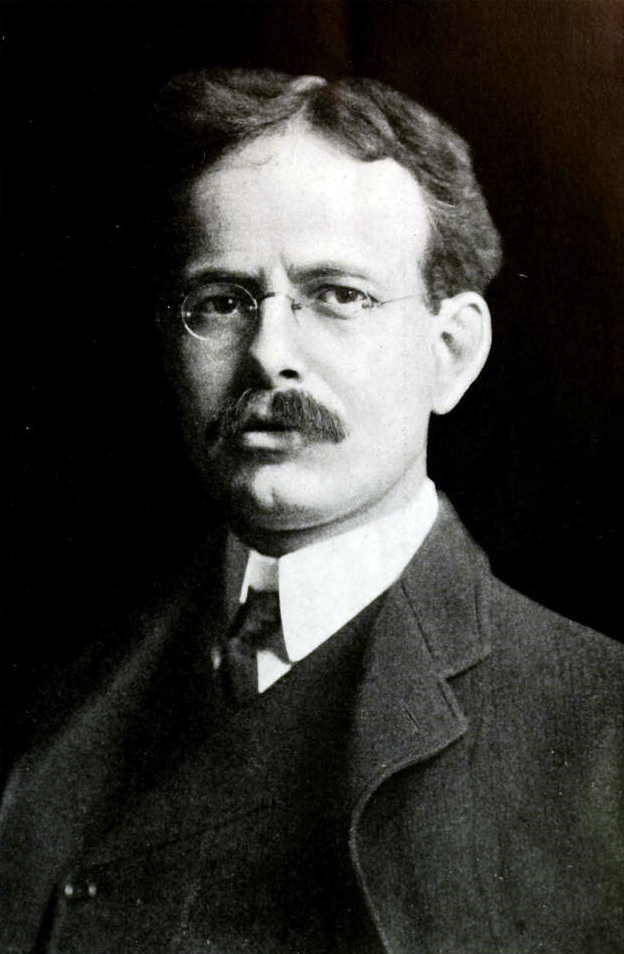
- George Ellery Hale, c. 1913
- Born: June 29, 1868; Chicago, Illinois, US
- Died: February 21, 1938 (aged 69); Pasadena, California, US
- Education: MIT
- Known for: Spectroheliograph; Hale's law; Hale cycle
- Spouse: Evelina Conklin Hale
- Awards: Janssen Medal (1894); Henry Draper Medal (1904); Bruce Medal (1916); Actonian Prize (1921); Elliott Cresson Medal (1926); Copley Medal (1932)
- Scientific career
- Fields: Astronomy; Astrophysics
- Workplaces: University of Chicago, Carnegie Institution for Science, Caltech

George Ellery Hale (June 29, 1868 – February 21, 1938) was an American astrophysicist best known for his discovery of magnetic fields in sunspots. He was also a key figure in the planning and construction of several world-leading telescopes: the 40-inch refracting telescope at Yerkes Observatory; the 60-inch Hale and 100-inch Hooker reflecting telescopes, both at Mount Wilson Observatory; and the 200-inch Hale reflecting telescope at Palomar Observatory. He played a key role in the foundation of the International Union for Cooperation in Solar Research and the National Research Council, and in developing the California Institute of Technology into a leading research university.

== Early life and education ==
George Ellery Hale was born on June 29, 1868, in Chicago, Illinois, to William Ellery Hale and Mary Browne. He is descended from Thomas Hale of Watton-on-Stone, Hertfordshire, England, whose son emigrated to America about 1640. His father acquired a considerable fortune manufacturing and installing passenger elevators during the reconstruction of Chicago, which had been destroyed in the Great Chicago Fire of 1871. The oldest of three children who lived past childhood, George received strong encouragement from his father, who supported the boy's active mind and curiosity, and his mother, who inculcated in him a love of poetry and literature.

He spent his youth fascinated by the books and machinery given to him by his parents—one of his most prized possessions was a small microscope. With his father's encouragement, he built a small shop in their house that turned into a laboratory. The microscope led to his interest in optics. At the age of fourteen, George built his first telescope. His father later replaced it with a second-hand Clark refractor that they mounted on the roof of their Kenwood house. Soon he was photographing the night skies, observing a partial eclipse of the Sun, and drawing sunspots.

As an avid reader with a strong interest in the budding field of astrophysics, Hale was drawn to the writings of William Huggins, Norman Lockyer, and Ernest Rutherford. His fascination with science, however, did not preclude interests more typical of a normal boy, such as fishing, boating, swimming, skating, tennis, and bicycling. He was an enthusiastic reader of the stories of Jules Verne—particularly drawn to the tales of adventure set in the mountains of California. Hale spent summers at his grandmother's house in the old New England village of Madison, Connecticut, where he met his future wife, Evelina Conklin.

After graduating from Oakland Public School in Chicago, Hale attended the Allen Academy, where he studied chemistry, physics, and astronomy. He supplemented his practical home experience by attending a course in shop-work at the Chicago Manual Training School. During these years, Hale developed a knowledge of the principles of architecture and city planning with the help of his father's friend, well-known architect Daniel Burnham. Upon Burnham's advice and encouragement, Hale decided at the age of seventeen to continue his education at the Massachusetts Institute of Technology (MIT).

Hale was educated at MIT, at the Harvard College Observatory, (1889–90), and in Berlin (1893–94) where he was a PhD student but never finished his degree. At the time he already had an appointment as a professor at the recently established University of Chicago. As an undergraduate at MIT, he is known for inventing the spectroheliograph, with which he made his discovery of solar vortices.

== Research ==
Hale at the Fourth Conference International Union for Cooperation in Solar Research at Mount Wilson Observatory, 1910

In 1890, he began research at the Kenwood Astrophysical Observatory, which Hale's father had built for him; he was professor of astrophysics at Beloit College (1891–93); associate professor at the University of Chicago until 1897, and full professor (1897–1905). He was coeditor of Astronomy and Astrophysics, 1892–95, and after 1895 editor of the Astrophysical Journal. He also served on the board of trustees for Science Service, now known as Society for Science & the Public, from 1921 to 1923.

In 1908, he used the Zeeman effect with a modified spectroheliograph to establish that sunspots were magnetic. Subsequent work demonstrated a strong tendency for east-west alignment of magnetic polarities in sunspots, with mirror symmetry across the solar equator; and that the polarity in each hemisphere switched orientation from one sunspot cycle to the next. This systematic property of sunspot magnetic fields is now commonly referred to as the "Hale–Nicholson law," or in many cases simply "Hale's law."

Hale spent a large portion of his career trying to find a way to image the solar corona without the benefit of a total solar eclipse, but this was not achieved until the work of Bernard Lyot. In October 1913, Hale received a letter from Albert Einstein, asking whether certain astronomical observations could be done that would test Einstein's hypothesis concerning the effects of gravity on light. Hale replied in November, saying that such observations could be done only during a total eclipse of the Sun.

== Founding and organizing of institutions ==
Hale was a driven individual, who worked to found a number of significant astronomical observatories, including Yerkes Observatory, Mount Wilson Observatory, Palomar Observatory, and the Hale Solar Laboratory. At Mount Wilson, he hired and encouraged Harlow Shapley and Edwin Hubble toward some of the most significant discoveries of the time. He was a prolific organizer who helped create a number of astronomical institutions, societies and journals. Hale also played a central role in developing the California Institute of Technology into a leading research university. After retiring as director at Mount Wilson, he built the Hale Solar Laboratory in Pasadena, California, as his office and workshop, pursuing his interest in the sun.

From early youth, Hale had been internationally oriented, travelling widely throughout Europe in his younger years. Having long realized the value of an international organization to coordinate scientific research, he pursued, as chairman of a committee of the National Academy of Sciences of the US, the formation of an international organization for solar research. The society's inaugural meeting was held at the St. Louis Exposition of 1904 and included representatives from 16 national scientific societies, but notably not from the Prussian Academy of Sciences, which had declined the invitation. Instead, German delegates from the German Physical Society were present.

The delegates proceeded to appoint a committee that was to create the International Union for Cooperation in Solar Research as a permanent international scientific organization; the new union had its first constituted meeting at Oxford in England a year later. Further meetings were held in Paris in 1907 and at Mount Wilson in 1910, where the purview of the Union was enlarged to include stellar research, in keeping with Hale's emphasis on the Sun as just one among the many other stars. Shortly after the last meeting in Bonn in 1913, World War I broke out, which effectively put an end to the Union's activities. Work continued after the 1919 founding of the International Astronomical Union.

During the war, Hale played a key role in founding the National Research Council to support the government in using science for its policy aims, in particular to further its military ends. In 1922, he was appointed at the League of Nations' Committee on Intellectual Cooperation but had to resign after a few months because of health problems. He was replaced by his colleague Robert Andrews Millikan.

== Personal life ==
Hale suffered from neurological and psychological problems, including insomnia, frequent headaches, and depression. The often-repeated myth of schizophrenia, alleging he claimed to have regular visits from an elf who acted as his advisor, arose from a misunderstanding by one of his biographers. He occasionally took time off to spend a few months at a sanatorium in Maine. These problems forced him to resign as director of Mount Wilson. He died at the Las Encinas Sanitarium in Pasadena in 1938.

== Honors and awards ==
- 1894 Janssen Medal from the Paris Academy of Sciences
- 1902 Rumford Prize from the American Academy of Arts & Sciences
- 1902 Elected as a member to the American Philosophical Society
- 1904 Henry Draper Medal from the National Academy of Sciences
- 1904 Gold Medal of the Royal Astronomical Society
- 1916 Catherine Wolfe Bruce Gold Medal from the Astronomical Society of the Pacific
- 1916 Honorary Member of the Optical Society of America
- 1917 Prix Jules Janssen from the French Astronomical Society
- 1919 Elected an associate of Académie des Sciences, Institut de France
- 1920 Galileo Medal from the University of Florence
- 1921 Actonian Prize from Royal Institution of London
- 1926 Elliott Cresson Medal in Physics from the Franklin Institute of Philadelphia
- 1926 Arthur Noble Medal from the City of Pasadena
- 1927 Franklin Medal from the Franklin Institute of Philadelphia
- 1932 Sir Godfrey Copley Medal from the Royal Society of Great Britain
- 1935 Frederic Ives Medal from the Optical Society of America
- Foreign Member of the Royal Society
- Medal of Merit of the Order of Leopold from Belgium
- Order of the Crown of Italy
- Honorary Member of the Vienna Academy of Sciences

== Legacy ==
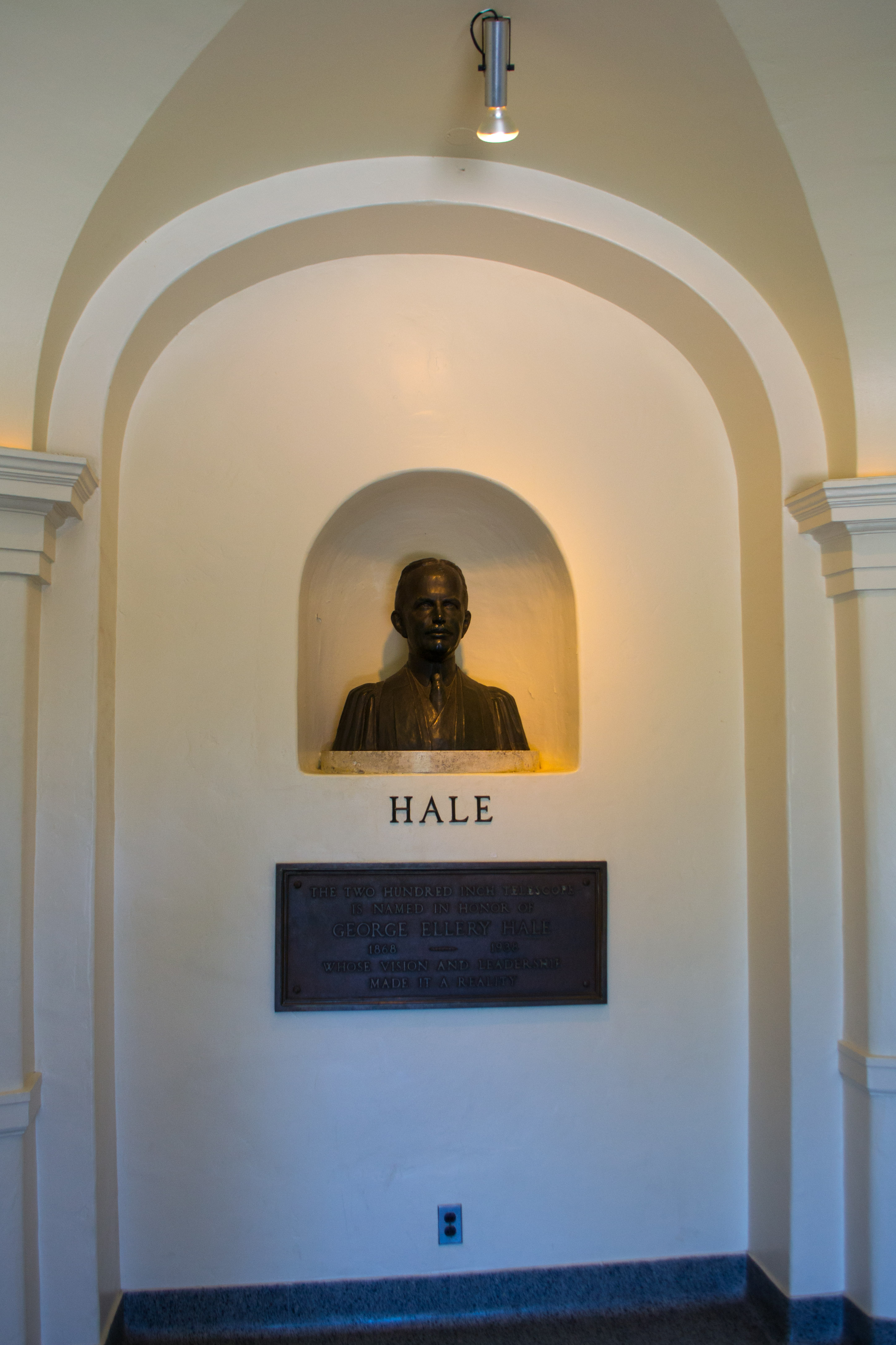
A bust of George Ellery Hale at Palomar Observatory

- 100 inch telescope at Mount Wilson Observatory
- Yerkes Observatory, Williams Bay, Wisconsin
- Hale Telescope at Palomar Observatory
- 22-year solar Hale cycle
- 1024 Hale asteroid
- Mount Hale, 13,494 ft (4,113 m), the 55th highest peak in the Sierra Nevada
- Hale lunar crater
- Hale Martian crater
- George Ellery Hale Middle School, Woodland Hills, California
- Hale House, Shoreland Hall, University of Chicago
- Hale Building, Pasadena, California
- George Ellery Hale Prize, awarded by the Solar Physics Division of the American Astronomical Society

== Popular culture ==
Fox Mulder uses the pseudonym "George E. Hale" on several occasions in the TV series The X-Files, most notable in Season 2, Episode 1 "Little Green Men", and Season 2, Episode 4 "Sleepless".

Check It Out! with Dr. Steve Brule has an episode on "space" which references a real fact about Hale in passing.
