= Reliance Building =

Building in Chicago, Illinois

- U.S. National Register of Historic Places
- U.S. National Historic Landmark
- U.S. Historic district – Contributing property
- Chicago Landmark
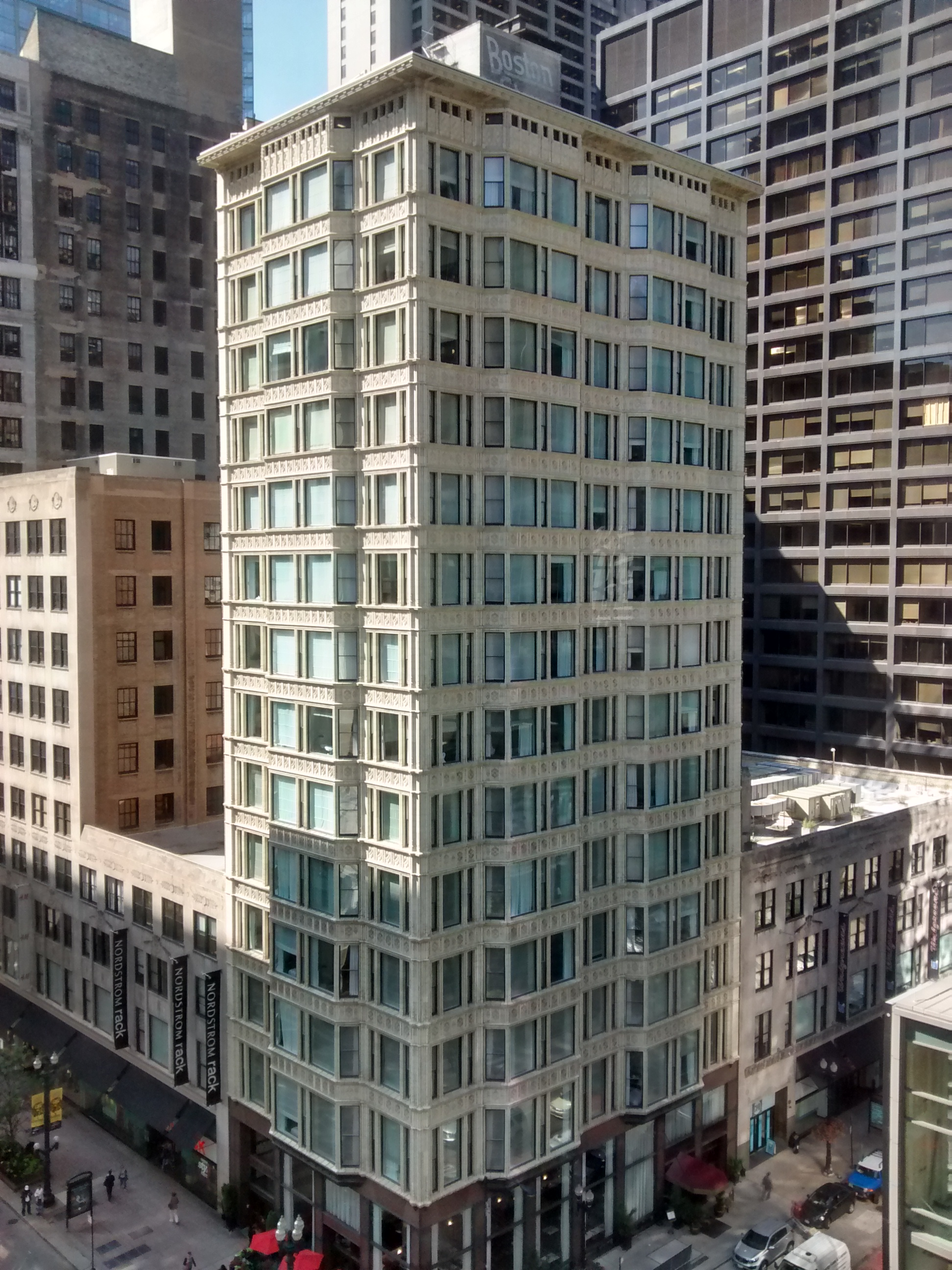
- The Reliance Building in 2015

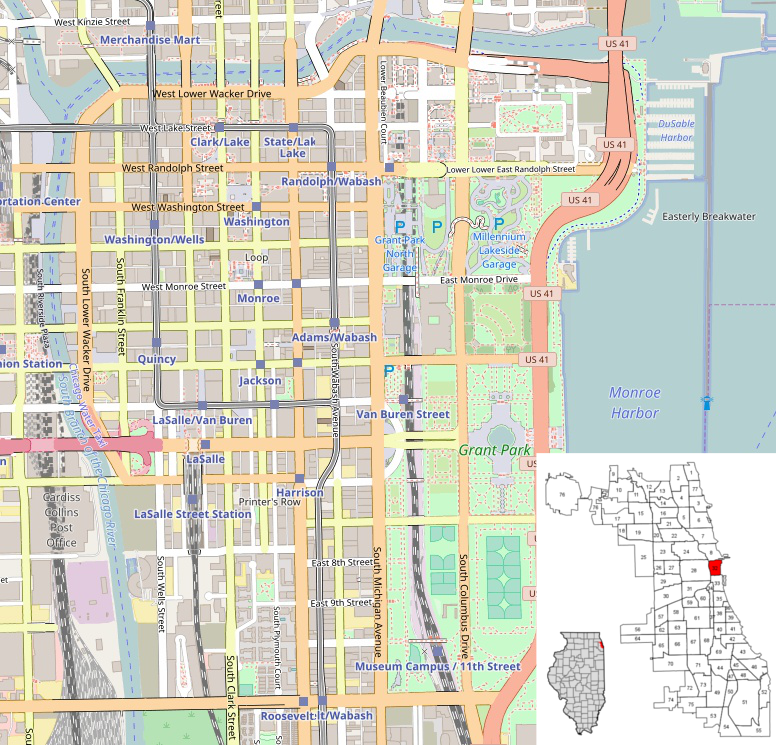
- Location within Chicago Loop
- Location: 1 W. Washington St., Chicago, Illinois
- Coordinates: 41°52′58″N 87°37′40″W
- Built: 1890–1895
- Architect: John Root, Charles B. Atwood
- Architectural style: Chicago School
- Part of: Loop Retail Historic District (ID98001351)
- NRHP reference No.: 70000237

Significant dates
- Added to NRHP: October 15, 1970
- Designated NHL: January 7, 1976
- Designated CHICL: July 11, 1995

The Reliance Building is a skyscraper at 1 West Washington Street in the Loop community area of Chicago, Illinois. The first floor and basement were designed by John Root of the Burnham and Root architectural firm in 1890, while the rest of the building was completed by Charles B. Atwood in 1895. It is the first skyscraper to have large plate glass windows covering the majority of its surface area—a design feature that became dominant in the 20th century. The building fell into disrepair starting in the 1940s, and was restored in the late 1990s. Since 1999, the building has housed the 122-room Staypineapple, An Iconic Hotel, The Loop (formerly the Hotel Burnham) and Atwood Cafe.

The Reliance Building was listed on the National Register of Historic Places in 1970 and designated a National Historic Landmark in 1976. The Reliance Building is also part of the Loop Retail Historic District, a collection of over one hundred buildings concentrated around State and Wabash Streets.

== History ==
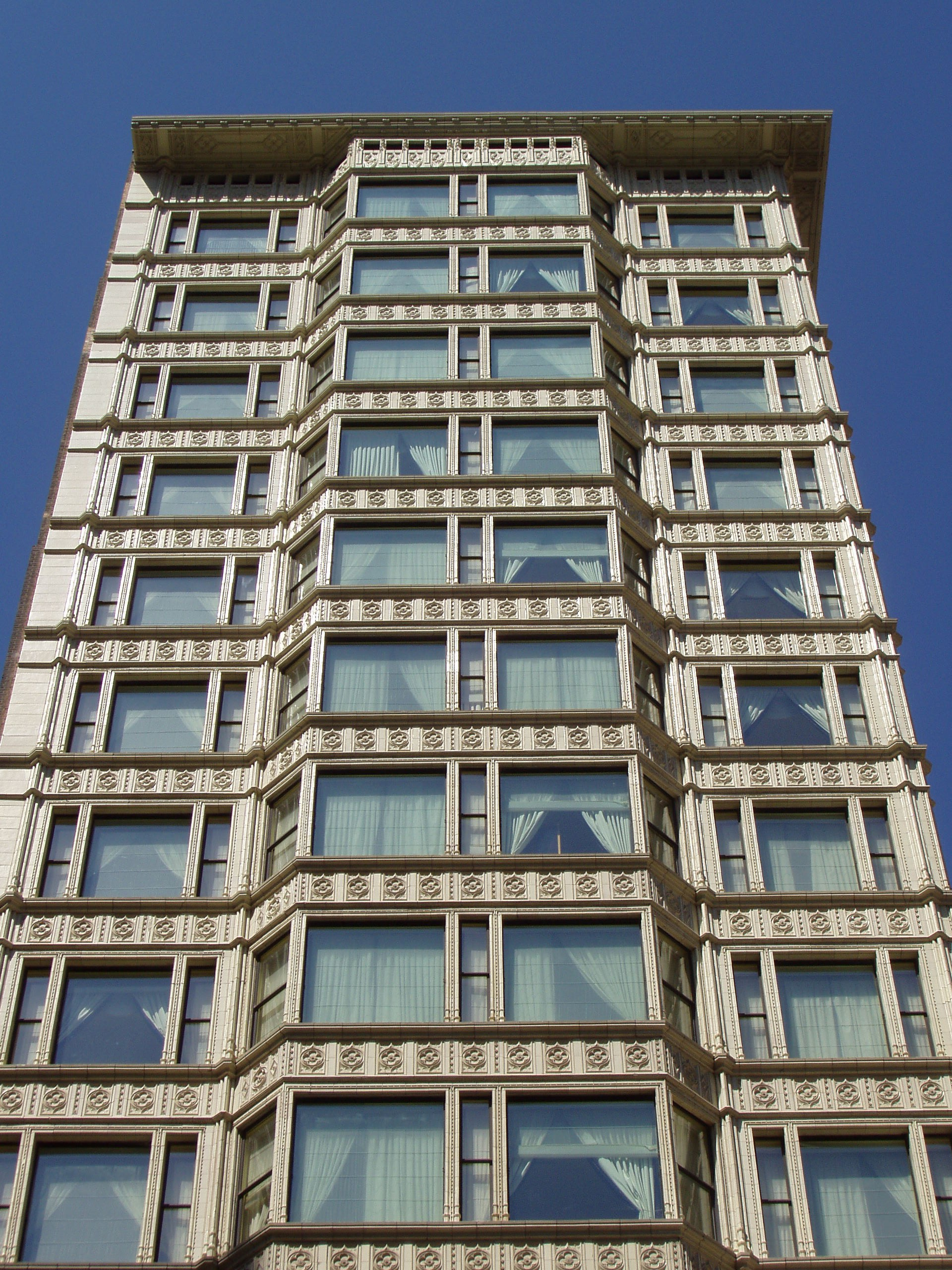
Upper facade

Commercial real estate in Chicago, Illinois, boomed in the late 1870s due to the recovery from the 1871 Great Chicago Fire and the depression of 1873–79. In 1880, William Ellery Hale purchased a small lot in the Loop community area containing the four-story First National Bank Building, one of the few offices in downtown Chicago to partially survive the Great Fire. Hale was the founder of the Hale Elevator Company, an early producer of hydraulic elevators necessary in skyscraper design. Hale envisioned a new tower on the site, but first needed to raze the existing structure. However, its tenants did not want to terminate their leases.

Instead, Hale lifted the second, third, and fourth floors on jackscrews and demolished the first. A new basement and ground floor, designed by John Wellborn Root of the Burnham & Root firm, were constructed in 1890.

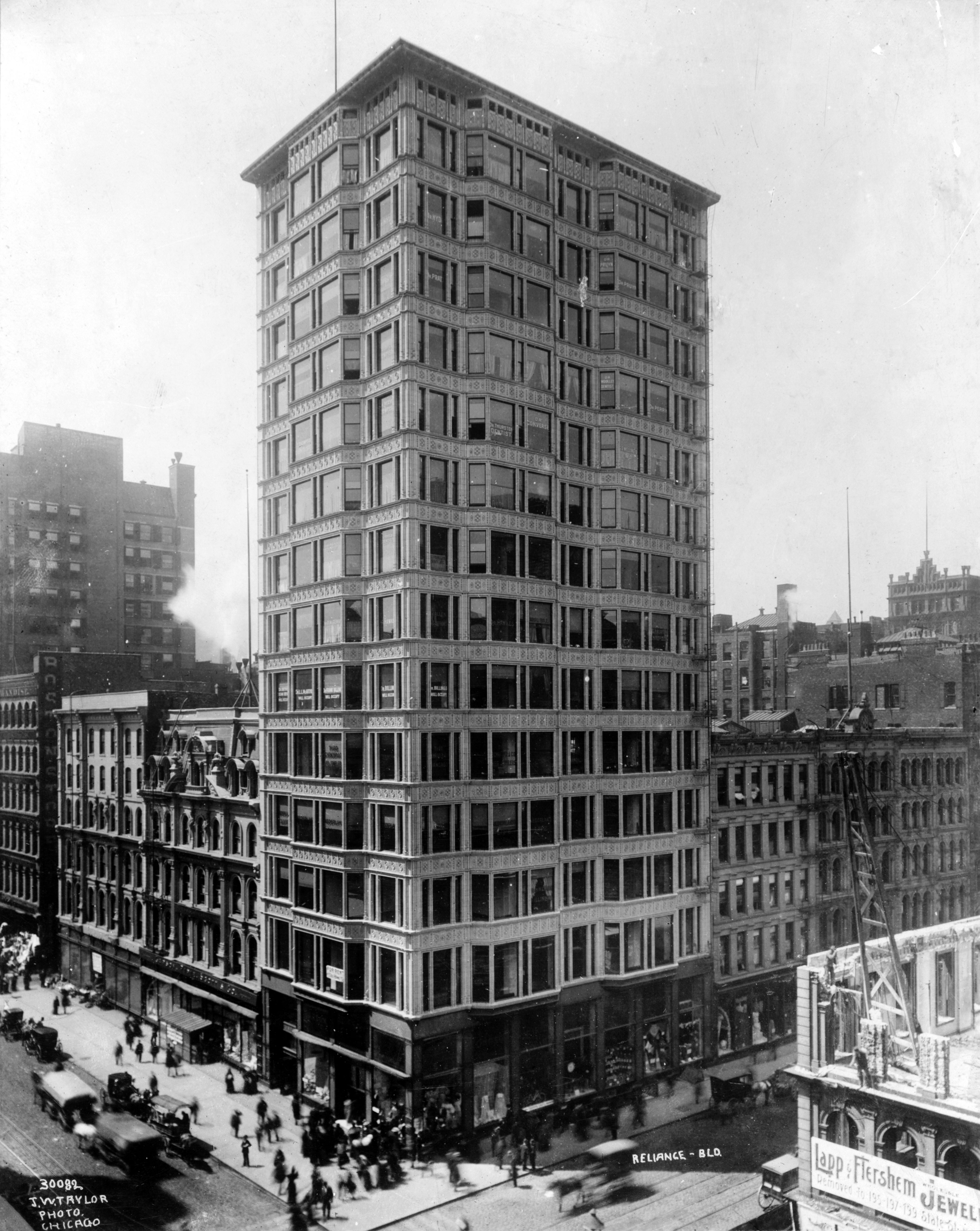
Reliance Building in 1895

Hale had become acquainted with Burnham & Root through his other real estate projects, such as the Rookery Building. Burnham & Root were renowned in Chicago by this point, having already designed twenty other buildings in the Loop. Root developed the floating raft system, which enabled designers to build large, steel-frame buildings on a reinforced concrete foundation, a necessity in Chicago's moist soil. Root and Hale agreed that the new building needed to have large glass windows on the first floor with large, open spaces. On the upper floors, Hale intended to have several stories dedicated to smaller tenants, with offices for doctors and other professionals on the top floors. He also specifically emphasized the need for natural lighting on all floors. The plan for the Reliance Building was consistent with the growing concept of the Chicago school of architecture, which emphasized the importance of form following function. Root died of pneumonia on January 15, 1891, before the completion of his portion of the Reliance Building; his intended design for the rest of the building has never been found. Carson Pirie Scott & Co. was the first tenant of the Reliance Building, opening a dry goods store on the first floor once it was completed.

Daniel Burnham recruited Boston architect Charles B. Atwood to complete the building with E. C. Shankland as lead engineer. After raising the original building's remaining three floors Atwood used white glazed architectural terra-cotta cladding, a feature that would later become strongly associated with him following his works for the World's Columbian Exposition in 1893. At the time, it was believed that the recently developed enameled terra-cotta would never need to be cleaned because its smooth surface would allow any dirt to wash away in the rain. The steel framing on the top ten floors was completed over fifteen days, from July 16 to August 1, 1895. The Reliance Building, so named for its functionality, opened in March 1895. It was one of the first skyscrapers to offer electricity and phone service in all of its offices. In its first few decades, it provided office space for merchants and health professionals, including Al Capone's dentist.

The building struggled during the Great Depression, and slowly declined. In October 1948, Karoll's Men's Shop opened a store on the lower two floors, with a modern façade that obliterated the original storefront. However, the upper floors remained hard to fill. On October 15, 1970, the Reliance Building was listed on the National Register of Historic Places by the National Park Service. On January 7, 1976, it was recognized as a National Historic Landmark. The building continued to fall into disrepair, as the small size of its retail spaces were not appealing to business interests in the late 20th century. The city of Chicago made a commitment to revitalize the structure, but City Hall could not agree on a plan. The debate became particularly polarized after the 1989 demolition of the nearby McCarthy Building, which angered preservationists but satisfied business interests by providing space for a modern office building. Finally, in 1994, the McClier corporation collaborated with the Baldwin Development Company to restore the Reliance Building; these two groups had recently worked together to rehabilitate the Rookery Building. The City of Chicago purchased the property at this time for $1.3 million (equivalent to $2.82 million in 2025). The Reliance Building's rehabilitation was completed in 1999 at a cost of $27.5 million (equivalent to $53.1 million in 2025). as the former retail space was converted into a luxury hotel. Canal Street Partners, LLC bought the revitalized space and created the Hotel Burnham. The preservation of this building was championed by the Landmarks Preservation Council of Illinois. Chicago Mayor Richard M. Daley was presented with a National Trust for Historic Preservation Honor Award in 2001 for the role of the city in preserving the structure. In December 2016, Pineapple Hospitality purchased the building and renamed the hotel as first The Alise Chicago, then later Staypineapple, An Iconic Hotel, The Loop.

== Architecture ==
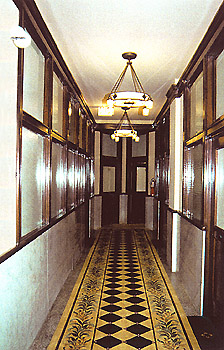
A hallway of the Reliance Building following the 1999 restoration

The addition of the remaining floors in 1894–1895 completed the building and marked the "first comprehensive achievement" of the Chicago construction method. The building's plate-glass windows are set within the terra-cotta-tiled facade. Its steel-frame superstructure is built atop concrete caissons sunk as much as 125 feet beneath the footing.

The Reliance Building has been called "proto-Modernist" in its lack of the hierarchy found in Classical facades. Its stacks of projecting bay windows and terra-cotta cladding create an effect of extraordinary lightness. Its steel frame construction is physically light as well, being one-third the weight of an equivalent stone structure. It was a direct precursor of the all-glass Friedrichstrasse skyscraper proposed by Mies van der Rohe in 1921. Richardson's Marshall Field Warehouse, built only eight years earlier, seems in comparison to be heavy, ponderous, and of another era.

== See also ==
- List of National Historic Landmarks in Illinois
- National Register of Historic Places listings in Central Chicago
- Chicago architecture
- 16 Cook Street, Liverpool, UK
- Oriel Chambers, Liverpool, UK
