= William Ellery Hale =

- Born: April 8, 1836; Bradford, Massachusetts, U.S.
- Died: November 16, 1898 (aged 62); Chicago, Illinois, U.S.
- Resting place: Oak Woods Cemetery
- Occupation: Businessman
- Known for: pioneer of hydraulic elevators
- Spouse: Mary Scranton Brown
- Children: 2 sons, 1 daughter

William Ellery Hale (April 8, 1836 – November 16, 1898) was an American businessman, real estate investor and civic leader. He was the president of the Hale Elevator Company, one of the first hydraulic elevator companies in the United States. He owned many buildings in Chicago.

== Early life ==
Hale was born on April 8, 1836, in Bradford, Massachusetts. He graduated from the Hartford High School.

== Career ==
Hale first worked as a clerk in Hartford, Connecticut. He joined the Rock River Paper Company in Beloit, Wisconsin, in 1857, and he was transferred to their Chicago store in 1862, where he worked until 1871.

Hale founded W. E. Hale & Co., a Chicago-based company which pioneered the construction of hydraulic elevators in the West, in 1870. Hale sold it to the Otis Elevator Company in 1887.

Hale was a real estate investor in Chicago, where he owned many buildings, including the Reliance Building. He also invested in the railroads.

== Civic activities ==
Hale donated $70,000 to Beloit College in 1892. He made donations New West Educational Commission, which built schools in Utah, and he supported the American Board of Foreign Missions

== Personal life and death ==
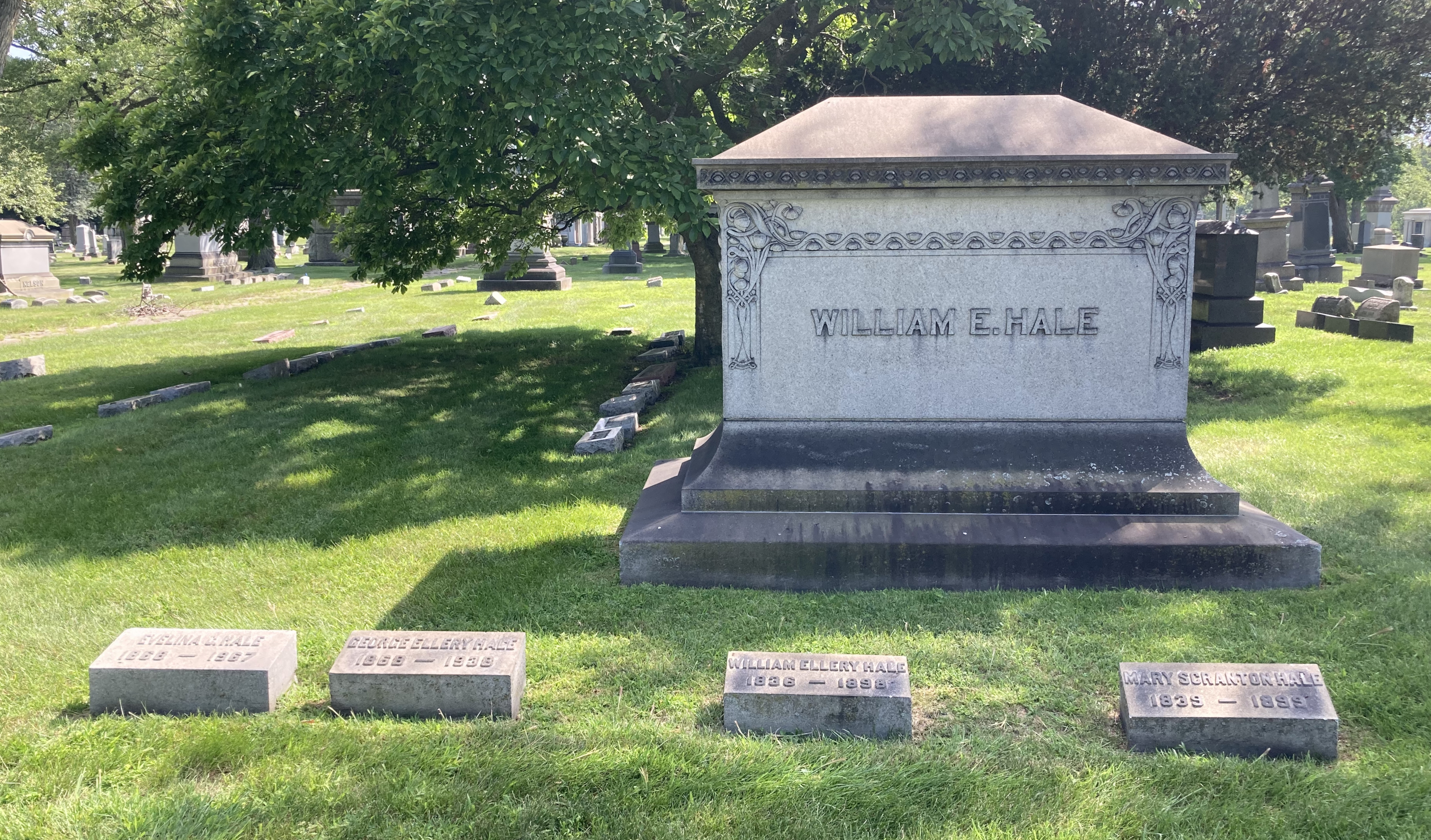
Hale's grave at Oak Woods Cemetery

Hale married Mary Scranton Brown in 1862. They had two sons, including George Ellery Hale, who became an astronomer, and a daughter. They resided at 4545 South Drexel Boulevard in Chicago. Hale was a member of the South Congregational Church in Chicago.

Hale died of Bright's disease on November 16, 1898, in Chicago. He was buried in the Oak Woods Cemetery.
