= International Union for Cooperation in Solar Research =

- Successor: International Astronomical Union
- Formation: 1905; 121 years ago
- Founder: George Ellery Hale
- Dissolved: 1913; 113 years ago

The International Union for Cooperation in Solar Research was an international organization dedicated to solar research between 1905 and 1913. It is one of the precursor organizations of the International Astronomical Union.

== Description ==
The Union was the brain-child of George Ellery Hale, who had realized the potential value of an international organization to coordinate scientific research and, by virtue of his extensive travels throughout Europe, had many contacts among eminent astronomers and solar physicists. Hale suggested to the National Academy of Sciences of the US the formation of a committee with the aim of forming such an international organization, and, as the committee's chairman, began contacting various scientific academies. His efforts led to a meeting at the St. Louis Exposition of 1904 and included representatives from 16 national scientific societies, but notably not from the Prussian Academy of Sciences, which had declined the invitation. (Instead, German delegates from the German Physical Society were present.)

The delegates proceeded to appoint a committee that was to create the Union as a permanent international scientific organization; the new organization had its first constituted meeting at Oxford in England a year later. Further meetings were held in Paris in 1907 and at Mount Wilson in 1910, where the purview of the Union was enlarged to include stellar research, in keeping with Hale's emphasis on the Sun as just one among the many other stars. Shortly after the last meeting in Bonn in 1913, World War I broke out, which effectively put an end to the Union's activities, which would later find continuation after the 1919 founding of the International Astronomical Union.

== See also ==
- List of astronomical societies
