= Amundsen (crater) =

Lunar impact crater

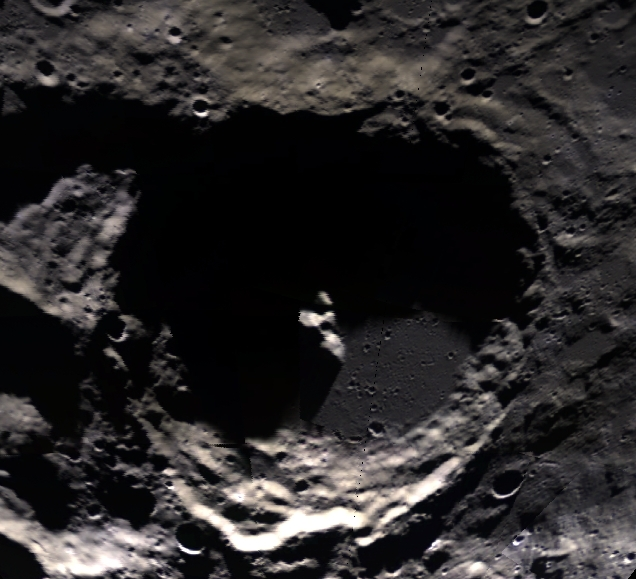
- Clementine image (1994)
- Coordinates: 84.5°S 82.8°E
- Diameter: 103.39 km (64.24 mi)
- Depth: 5.65 km (3.51 mi)
- Colongitude: 272° at sunrise
- Eponym: Roald Amundsen

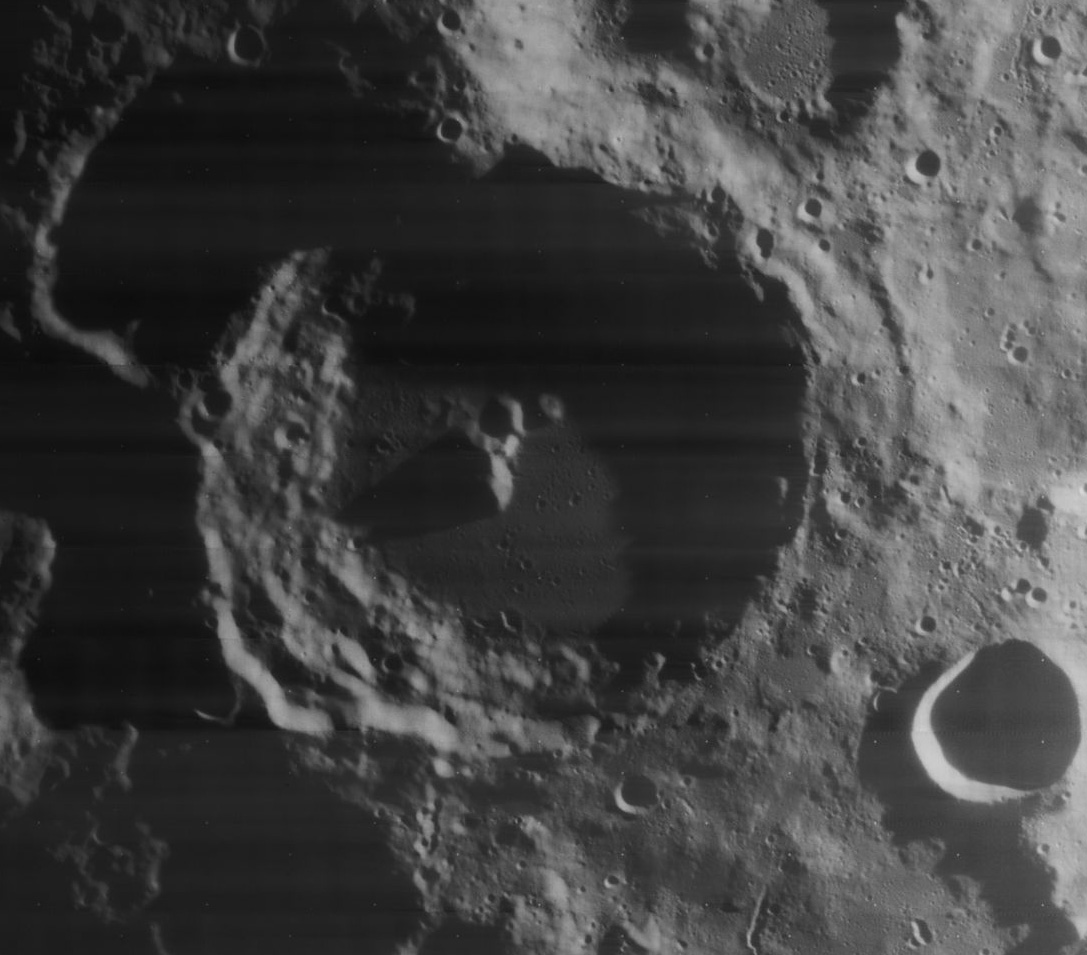
Lunar Orbiter 4 image (1967)

Amundsen is a large lunar impact crater located near the south pole of the Moon. This crater is named after the Norwegian explorer Roald Amundsen (1872–1928). It lies along the southern lunar limb, and so is viewed from the side by an observer on the Earth. The crater designation was formally adopted by the International Astronomical Union in 1964. Earlier, the name was proposed to the IAU by amateur selenographer H. P. Wilkins, but was rejected.

To the northwest of Amundsen is the crater Scott, a formation of similar dimensions that is named for another Antarctic explorer. Nobile is attached to the western rim. The Amundsen crater overlaps a smaller crater formation to the northwest, and Hédervári is attached to the northern rim. Just to the south of Amundsen is the smaller crater Faustini.

== Description ==
This crater lies across the rim of the 355-km diameter Amundsen-Ganswindt basin, which dates to the Pre-Nectarian era of the lunar geologic timescale. The impact that formed this crater dates to around 4.04 billion years ago. Resurfacing events on the crater floor and surrounding plains occurred 3.8 and 3.7 billion years ago.

The rim of Amundsen is slightly distended along the southern edge, and the terraced inner surface is wider at that point than elsewhere along the outer wall. The northern wall of Amundsen receives large amounts of solar illumination and flux from the solar wind, resulting in an increased maturity of the regolith (compared to the shadowed southern face).

The inner floor is relatively flat, with a pair of central peaks near the midpoint. Much of the crater floor is cloaked in shadow during the lunar day, with only the southern floor and the central peaks receiving sunlight.

Amundsen Crater hosts 82 square kilometers of carbon dioxide cold traps, where temperatures remain below 60 K (−213 °C; −352 °F), potentially containing solid carbon dioxide. Such areas could be high-priority target sites for future landed missions.

== Satellite craters ==
By convention these features are identified on lunar maps by placing the letter on the side of the crater midpoint that is closest to Amundsen.

Feature	Latitude	Longitude	Diameter	Ref
Amundsen C	80.7° S	83.2° E	24.22 km	WGPSN

The crater formerly named Amundsen A was renamed Hédervári in 2006.

== See also ==
- 1065 Amundsenia, Mars-crossing asteroid
