= Péter Hédervári =

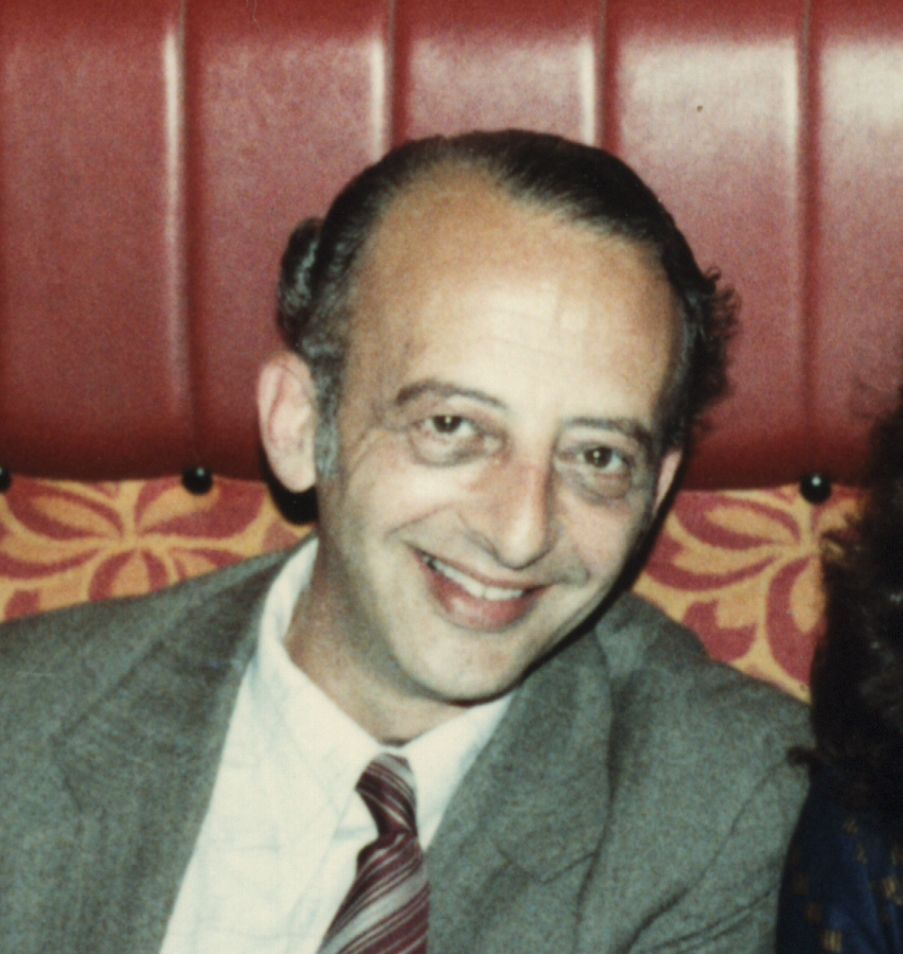
- Born: April 29, 1931; Budapest, Hungary
- Died: June 27, 1984 (aged 53); Budapest, Hungary
- Parents: Károly Hoffmann (father); Edith Willmann (mother)

Péter Hédervári (1931-1984) was a geophysicist, scientific popularizer, amateur astronomer, and member of several national and international scientific societies.

== Career ==
After receiving his doctorate at Eötvös Loránd University, Budapest he served on the staff of the Eötvös Loránd Geophysical Institute from 1952 to 1963. From 1968, on he was a columnist with the weekly magazine Élet és Tudomány (Life and Science).

His specialty was the geology of the earth's moon and earth-like planets. His articles on these subjects appeared in the Fizikai Szemle (Physics Review), Magyar Fizikai Folyóirat (Hungarian Journal of Physics), Földrajzi Közlemények (Geographical Bulletin), and Földtani Közlöny (Bulletin of the Hungarian Geological Society). Several foreign journals also published his articles. A crater near the lunar south pole is named after him (Hédervári crater).

== Major works ==
- A Hold fizikája. 1962
- Erök és energiák a Föld életében. 1963
- Földszerkezet és földrengések.1966
- Amiről a Föld mesél. 1967
- Amiről a Hold mesél. 1969
- A Hold és meghóditása. 1970
- A Görög Pompeji: egy vulkán régészete. 1972
- Az óceán fogjai. 1973
- A Jávai tekercsek. 1975
- A Vénusz és a Mars ostroma. 1976. (with Marik Miklós and Pécsi Tamás)
- Mi újság a Földön. 1980
- Csillagunk a Nap. 1980
- Évezredek, vulkánok, emberek.1981
- Naprendszeren innen és túl. 1983
- Üstökös kutatás az űrkorszakban. 1983
- Képes csillagvilág. 1984
- Ismeretlen Naprendszerünk. 1986
- Vulkánkitörések más égitesteken. Földrajzi Közlöny 1959/1.
