= Hale (lunar crater) =

Lunar surface depression

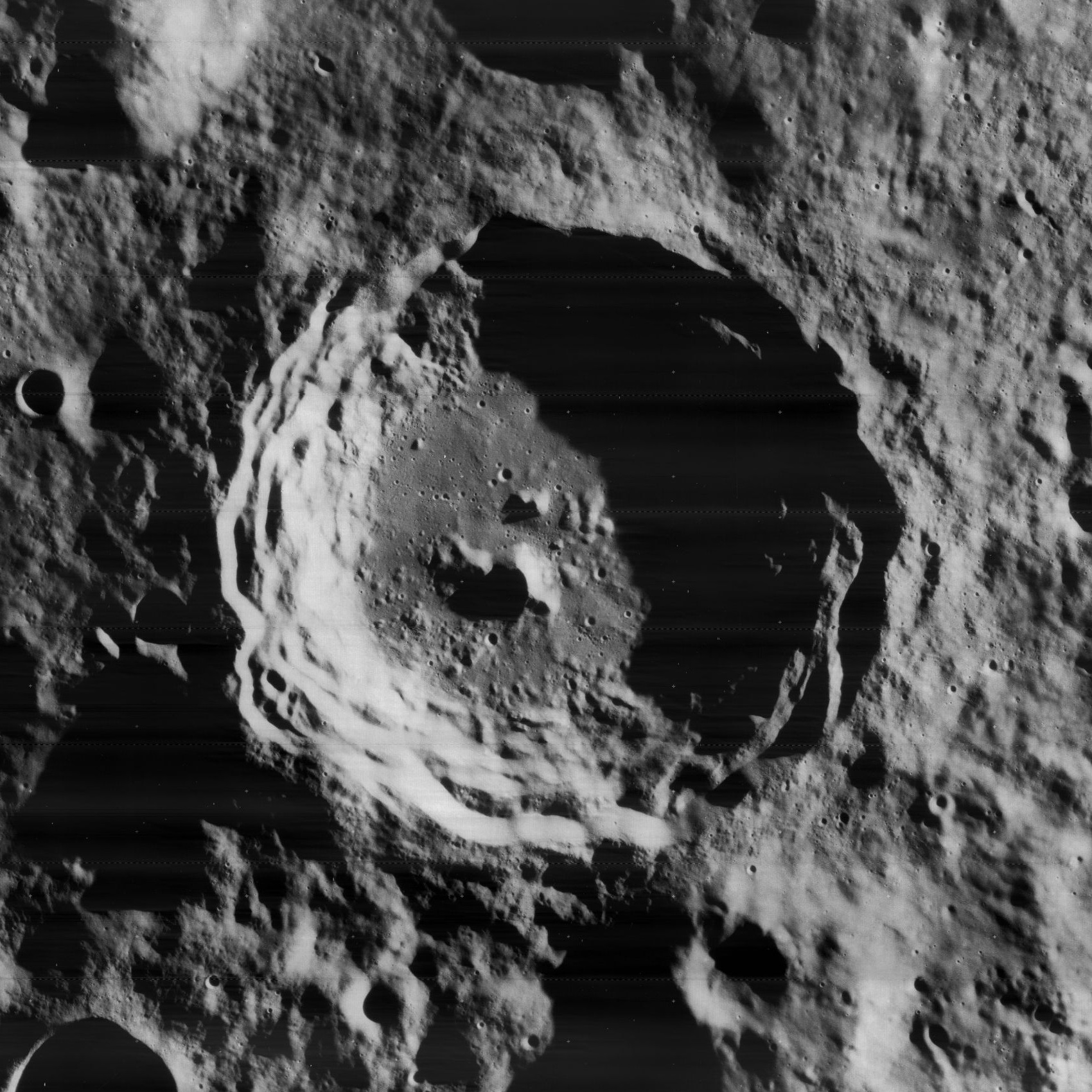
- Lunar Orbiter 4 image
- Coordinates: 74.2°S 90.8°E
- Diameter: 83 km
- Depth: 4.79 km (2.98 mi)
- Colongitude: 273° at sunrise
- Formation: Late Imbrian
- Eponym: George E. Hale; William Hale

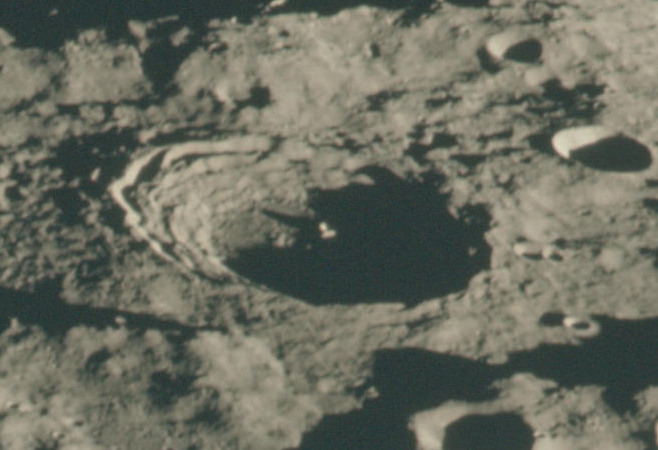
Oblique view of Hale from Apollo 15, facing south

Hale is a relatively young lunar impact crater that is located on the southern limb of the Moon. Over half the crater lies on the far side of the Moon, and from the Earth this formation is viewed from the side. Thus the crater must be viewed from orbit in order to discern much detail. The nearest crater of note is Wexler to the north. To the east on the far side is the huge walled plain Schrödinger, and to the southwest is the crater Demonax.

This formation is dated to the Late Imbrian period of the lunar geologic timescale. The rim of Hale is well-defined, with little wear from later impacts, but has a somewhat irregular, notched perimeter. The inner surface is multiply terraced with some indications of slumping. The inner floor is flat with only a few tiny craterlets to mark the surface. Near the midpoint of the interior is a complex central peak formation, with an additional low rise just to the north.

This crater is named after American astronomer George E. Hale (1868–1938) and British inventor William Hale (1797–1870).

== Satellite craters ==
By convention these features are identified on lunar maps by placing the letter on the side of the crater midpoint that is closest to Hale.

Hale	Latitude	Longitude	Diameter
Q	76.5° S	83.1° E	24 km
