= Grundy's Wonders =

- Title screen
- Developed by: Working Wonder Productions (series 6)
- Starring: John Grundy
- Country of origin: United Kingdom
- Original language: English
- No. of episodes: 30?

Production
- Producer: Steve Robins
- Production locations: North East England, Cumberland, North Yorkshire, East Riding of Yorkshire
- Running time: 25 mins approx.

Original release
- Network: Tyne Tees Television, ITV
- Release: 2000 – 2005

Related
- Grundy Goes...; Grundy's Northern Pride

Grundy's Wonders is a Tyne Tees Television architecture programme presented by John Grundy, which began in 2000.

On the programme, Grundy explores buildings in north-east England, as well as Cumbria and Yorkshire. Each programme has a particular theme or type of building, and Grundy names his favourite piece of architecture (on the week's theme) his "Grundy's Wonder", and gives a "Big Boot" to things he dislikes.

Grundy presents the programme in an enthusiastic way, while covering many aspects of the northern English region's history; this is also one of few architecture series on television.

== Episodes and places visited ==
=== Series 5 ===
- Episode 1: "Rock" (26 October 2004)
  Featured the North Bar gateway, Beverley; Burton Agnes Hall; River Glen bridge at Ewart (near Wooler), Northumberland; Swarland Brickworks library (betw. Rothbury and Alnwick), Beamish tram shelter.
  "Great Boot of History": BHS store, Northumberland Street, Newcastle.
  "Grundy's Wonder": Houses near Crossgate Peth, Durham, with view to Durham Cathedral.
- Episode 3: "Graffiti" (9 November 2004)
  Featured St Paul's Church, Jarrow; Falstow (near Kielder), Northumberland; Hexham Abbey; Berwick Town Hall prison.
  "Great Boot of History": Jesmond Metro station.
  "Grundy's Wonder": Prison cells, Carlisle Castle; Carlisle Cathedral.

=== Series 6 ===
- Programme 1: "Rock" (15 September 2005)
  Featured Bamburgh Castle; Bamburgh House; Steel Rigg (Hadrian's Wall); Beverley Minster.
  "Big Boot": Rock cut architecture.
- Programme 2: "Weather" (6 October 2005)
  Featured Swaledale, North Yorkshire; Ryedale Folk Museum, Hutton-le-Hole; Nunnykirk Hall, Muker; Joicey Road Open-Air School; Cassop, Co. Durham.
  "Big Boot": Badly-designed classrooms.
  "Wonder": Devonshire Building, Newcastle University.
- Programme 3: "Lead" (13 October 2005)
  Featured Killhope (former Park Level Mine), Co. Durham; Holmes Linn, Sinderhope, Northumberland; Stublick Chimney, Langley, Northumberland; Allenheads (former colliery); Ireshopeburn (Weardale Museum).
  "Big Boot": Slag heaps.
  "Wonder": Spar boxes , Weardale.
- Programme 4: "Listed" (20 October 2005)
  About listed buildings.
  Featured Ripon Cathedral, Ripon, North Yorks.; Surviving Medieval buildings, Quayside, Newcastle; Newcastle Castle Keep; St Bartholomew's Church, Whittingham, Northumberland.
  "Big Boot": Trinity Centre Multi-Storey Car Park, Gateshead.
- Programme 5: "Iron Town" (27 October 2005)
  Grundy pointed out reminders of the rural past in the industrialised Teesside.
  Marton, Ormesby Hall, Kirkleatham, Acklam Hall, Eston.
  "Big Boot": A66 road.
  "Wonder": Middlesbrough.
- Programme 6: "Monuments" (8 November 2005)
  Jesmond Old Cemetery; St Mary's Church, South Dalton, East Riding of Yorkshire; Sykes Sledmere Monument, Garton on the Wolds (near Sledmere), East Riding; Sledmere Eleanor Cross and Waggoner's Memorial, Sledmere; Grey's Monument, Newcastle; Angel of the North, Gateshead; The Spirit of South Tyneside, South Shields.
  "Wonder": Conversation Piece by Juan Muñoz, South Tyneside.
