= Oriel Chambers =

Listed building in Liverpool, England

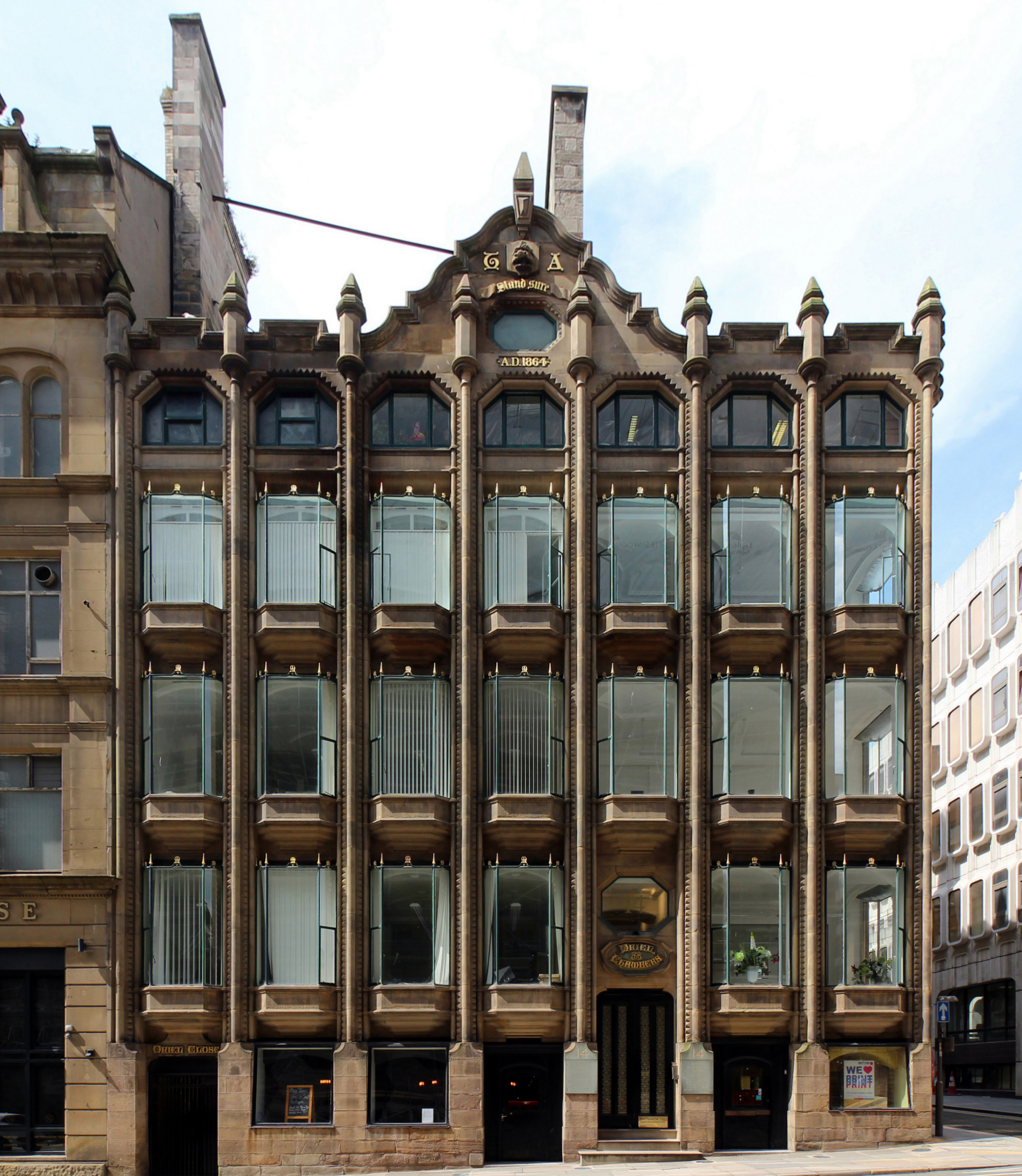
- Front view of Oriel Chambers

General information
- Architectural style: Victorian architecture
- Location: Liverpool, United Kingdom
- Coordinates: 53.4065°N 2.9932°W
- Year built: 1864

Design and construction
- Architect: Peter Ellis
- Designations

Listed Building – Grade I
- Official name: Oriel Chambers
- Designated: 12 July 1966
- Reference no.: 1291943

Oriel Chambers is an office building located on Water Street near the town hall in Liverpool, England. It was the world's first building featuring a metal-framed glass curtain wall, which has since become a defining feature of skyscrapers around the world. Designed by architect Peter Ellis and built in 1864, it has been Grade I listed since 1966 due to its outstanding importance.

== History ==
Peter Ellis won the commission for Oriel Chambers by competition and completed it in 1864 as evidenced by the building's inscription A.D. 1864 in the gable. It comprises 43,000 sq ft (4,000 m^{2}) of floor space set over five storeys. Ellis maximised the influx of light by employing a grid of oriel windows, which became the building's defining feature.

Initially, it was not well received. The Builder of 20 January 1866 criticised it:

The plainest brick warehouse in town is infinitely superior as a building to that large agglomeration of protruding plate-glass bubbles in Water Street termed Oriel Chambers. Did we not see this vast abortion – which would be depressing were it not ludicrous – with our own eyes, we should have doubted the possibility of its existence. Where and in what are their beauties supposed to lie?

However, the potential of Ellis's design was not lost on all of his contemporaries. John Wellborn Root studied in Liverpool as a teenaged boy, having been sent there by his father to be safe from the American Civil War following the Atlanta campaign in 1864. In all likelihood, he studied the then-brand-new Oriel Chambers and put the lessons learned to good use when he developed into an important architect of the Chicago School of Architecture, exporting Ellis's ideas across the Atlantic Ocean. Long rows of bay windows (of which oriels are a type) characterise some of Burnham and Root's 1880s American skyscrapers.

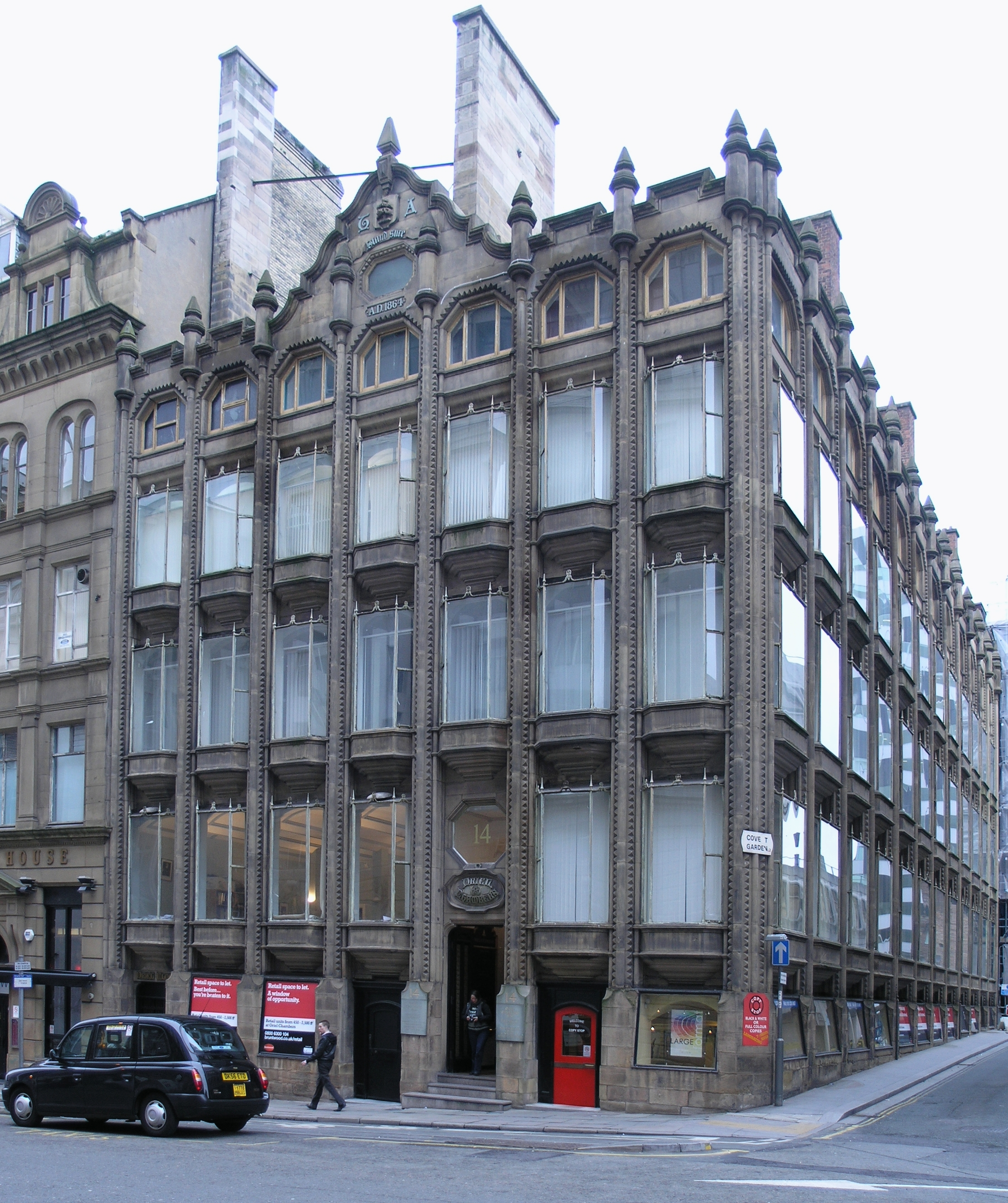
Side view of Oriel Chambers

More importantly, Oriel Chambers, and Ellis's building at 16 Cook Street in Liverpool, are amongst the precursors of modernist architecture for another reason. In addition to the extensive use of glass on their facades, both boast metal-framed glass curtain walls toward the courtyards, which makes them two of the world's first buildings to include this feature. Both buildings rely on H-section iron columns at the perimeter, which support the floors and cladding. Ellis's method for cladding was, however, not adopted by Burnham and Root: their Monadnock Building of 1891 has its distinctive bay windows still set in load-bearing brickwork.

Recognising its modernity, unsurprisingly, the critical assessment of Oriel Chambers was far more favourable in the 20th century. Nikolaus Pevsner called it "one of the most remarkable buildings of its date in Europe" and in his earlier book, Pioneers of Modern Design, describes it thus:

The delicacy of the ironwork in the plate-glass oriel windows and the curtain walling at the back with the vertical supports retracted yet visible from outside is almost unbelievably ahead of its time.

Architect Adam Caruso described Oriel Chambers as follows:

Its membranous windows are almost an expression of the open space of the interior pressing out into the space of the street.

== Today ==
Today the building looks a little different, combining its period architecture with a 1950s extension added after German aerial bombing destroyed a small section during the Second World War.

In 2006 it was purchased from DCT Developments by Bruntwood for just over £5 million who then spent £750,000 refurbishing the building. Bruntwood sold the building in 2019 to Yakel Property Investment who planned to undertake works to update the building.

The building's primary tenant is a set of barristers' chambers, which has been in occupation in various parts since 1965.

== Popular culture ==
Oriel Chambers and 16 Cook Street were featured in the first episode of John Grundy's television series Grundy's Northern Pride, which focused on buildings in the north of England.

== See also ==
- Architecture of Liverpool
- Grade I listed buildings in Liverpool
