= 16 Cook Street =

Listed building in Liverpool, England

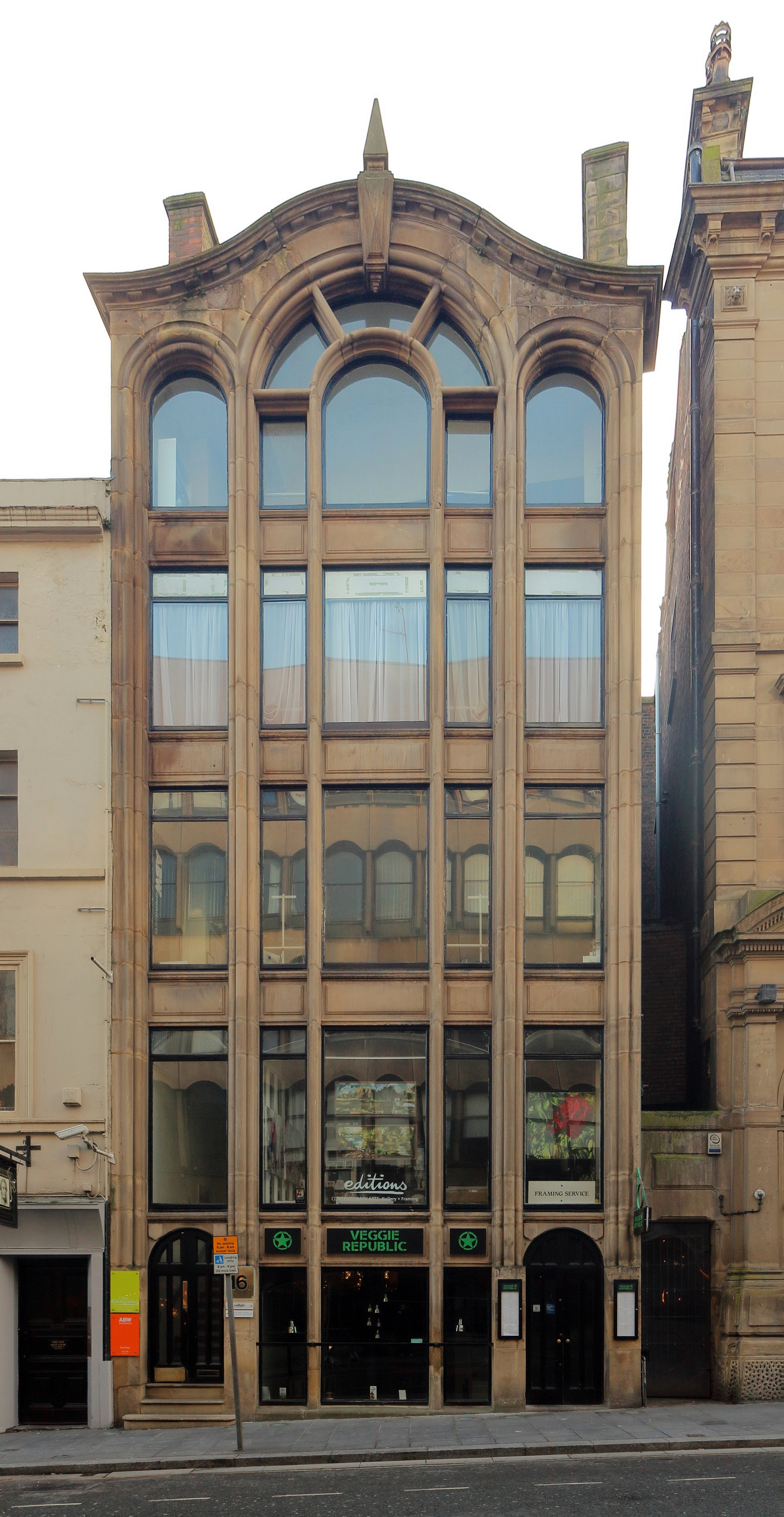
- The building in 2019
- Interactive map of the 16 Cook Street area

General information
- Location: Liverpool, England
- Coordinates: 53°24′22″N 2°59′21″W
- Year built: 1866; 160 years ago

Design and construction
- Architect: Peter Ellis
- Designations

Listed Building – Grade II*
- Official name: 16, Cook Street
- Designated: 12 July 1966
- Reference no.: 1068298

16 Cook Street in Liverpool, England, is the world's second glass curtain walled building. Designed by Peter Ellis in 1866, it is a Grade II* listed building.

Built two years after Oriel Chambers on Water Street, the architect's best-known work, it shows the development of Ellis' style. Its floor to ceiling glass allows light to penetrate deep into the building, contrasting strongly with the adjacent structures. It has been suggested that American architect John Root was influenced by the construction of both buildings, having studied in Liverpool at the time of their construction.

Both 16 Cook Street and Oriel Chambers were featured in the ITV (Granada / Tyne Tees) television programme Grundy's Northern Pride, looking at John Grundy's favourite buildings in the north of England, which aired on 9 January 2007.

== See also ==
- Architecture of Liverpool
- Grade II* listed buildings in Liverpool – City Centre
- Grade II* listed buildings in Merseyside
