= Northern Pride =

Northern pride may refer to:

- Northern Pride (festival), LGBT Festival in Newcastle upon Tyne
- Northern Pride RLFC, Australian rugby league club
- Grundy's Northern Pride, British television programme
