= Curtain wall (architecture) =

Outer non-structural walls of a building

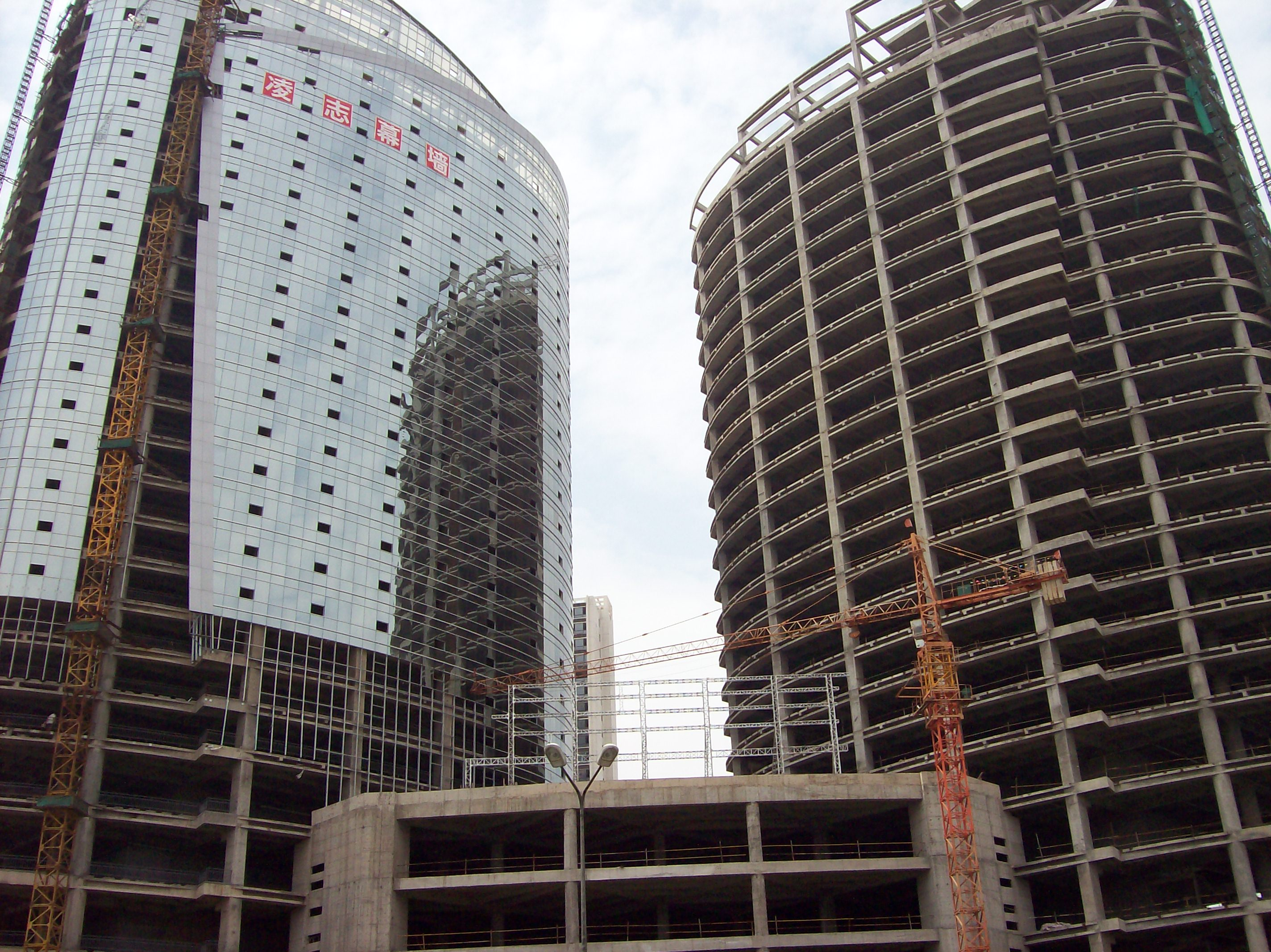
A building project in Wuhan, China, demonstrating the relationship between the inner load-bearing structure and an exterior glass curtain wall

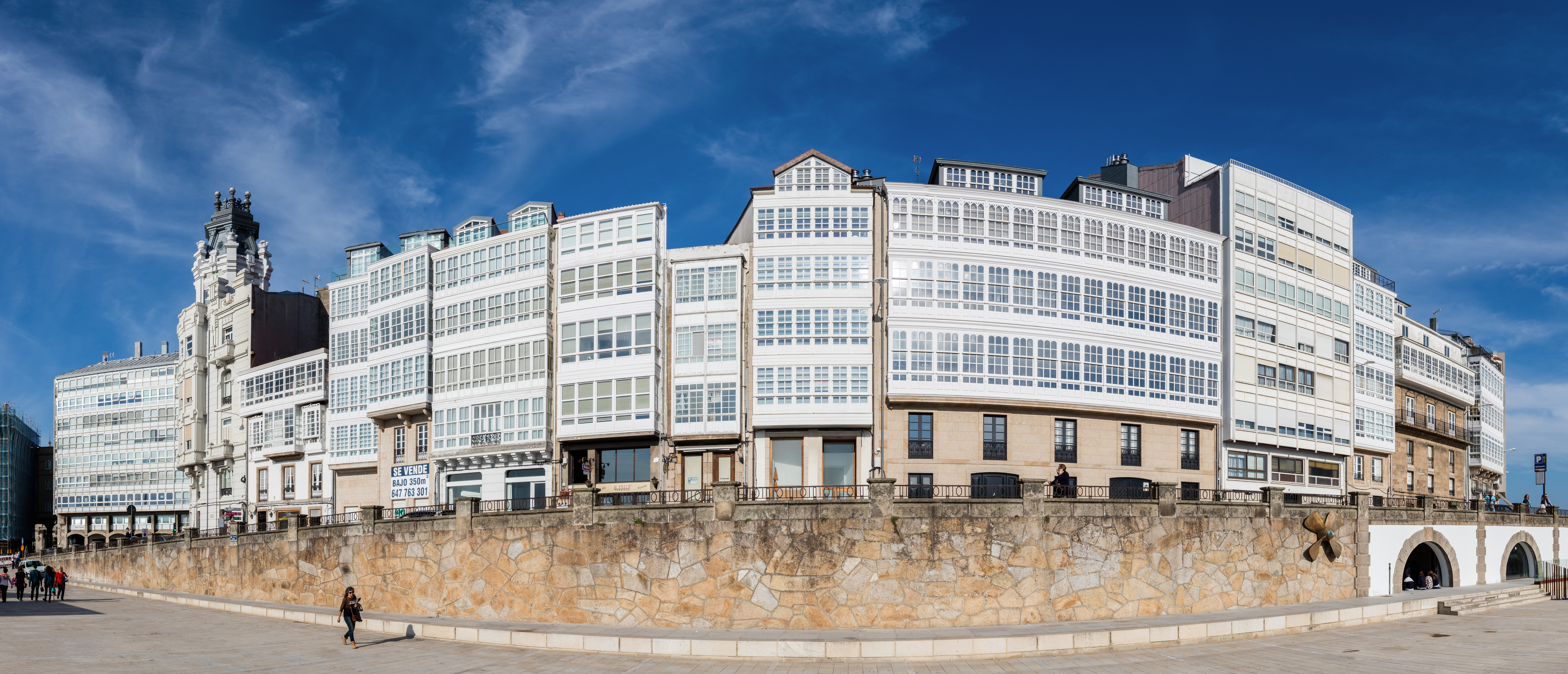
Curtain walls are also used on residential structures.

Curtain walls are non-structural exterior building walls. They protect the interior of the building from the elements but since they carry no structural load beyond their own dead-load weight, they can be made of lightweight materials. They transfer lateral wind loads to the main building's structure through connections at floors or columns.

Curtain walls may be designed as "systems" that integrate frame, wall panel, and weatherproofing materials. Steel frames have largely given way to aluminum extrusions. Glass is typically used for infill because it can reduce construction costs, provides a pleasing look, and allows natural light to penetrate deeper within the building. However, glass makes the effects of light on visual comfort and solar-heat gain in a building more difficult to control. Other common infills include stone veneer, metal panels, louvres, and operable windows and vents.

Unlike storefront systems, curtain wall systems are designed to span multiple floors, taking into consideration building sway and movement and design requirements such as thermal expansion and contraction; seismic requirements; water diversion; and thermal efficiency for cost-effective heating, cooling, and interior lighting.

== History ==
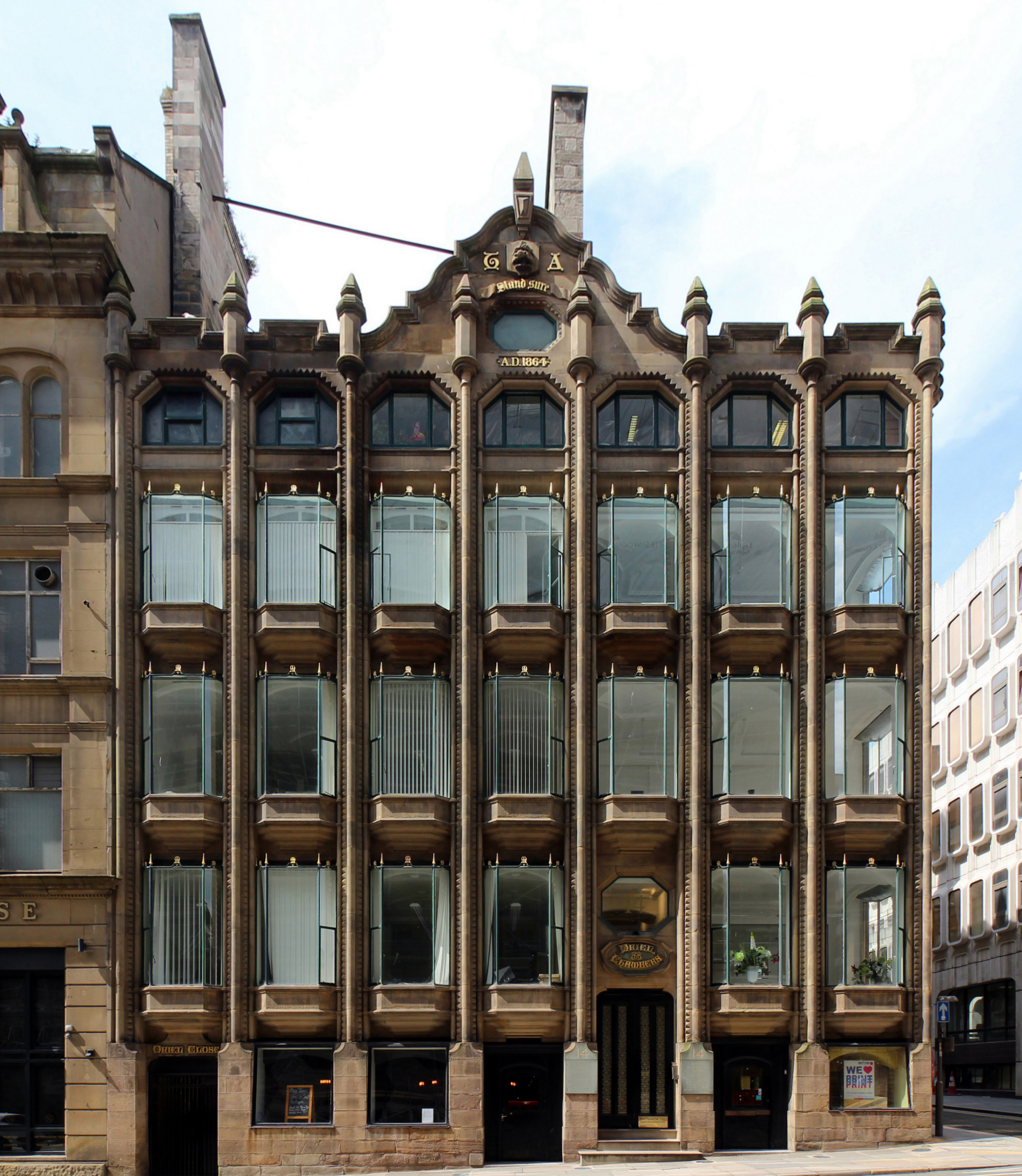
Oriel Chambers, Liverpool, England. Designed by the architect Peter Ellis and built in 1864, it is the world's first building to feature a metal-framed glass curtain wall.

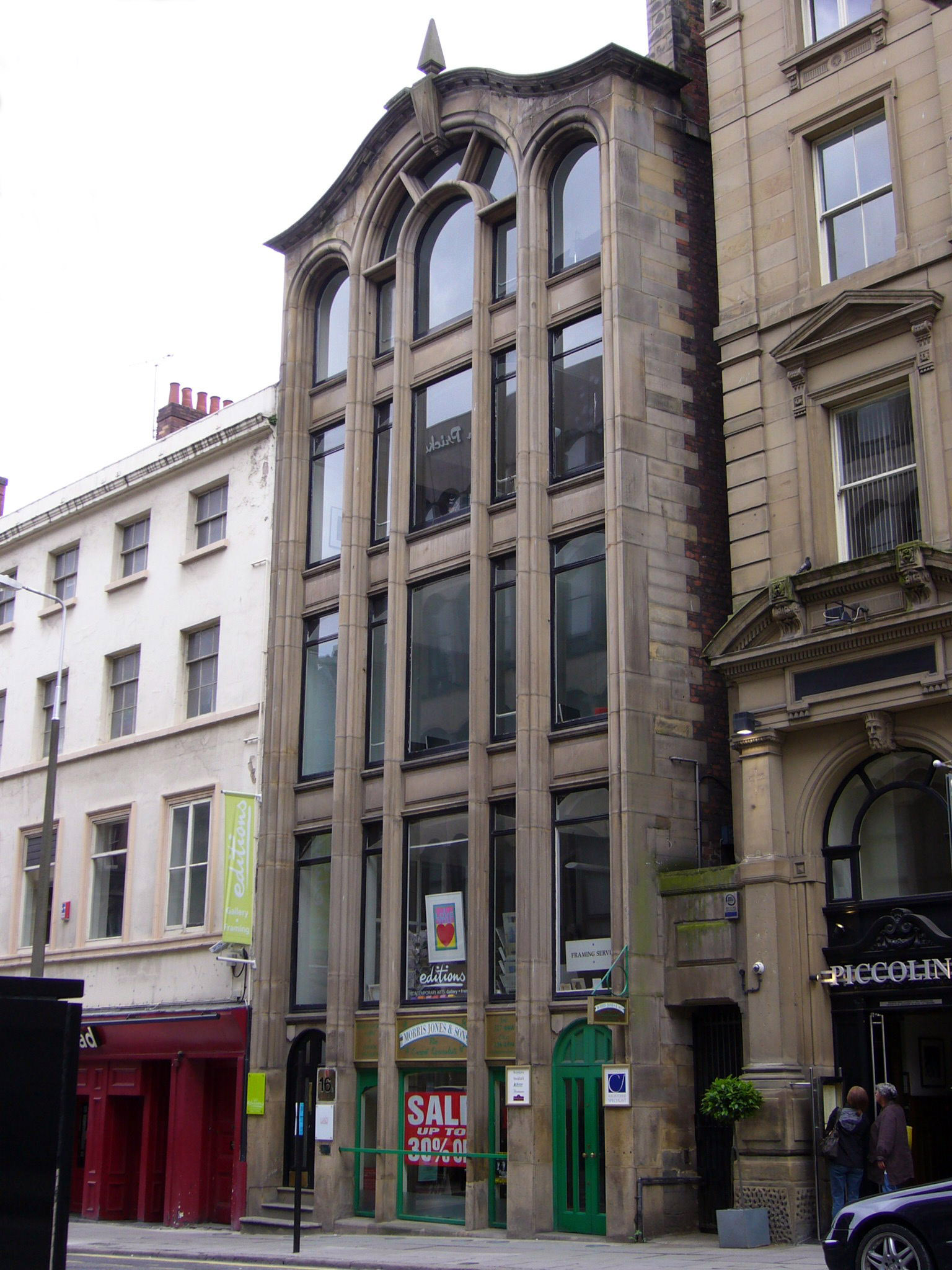
16 Cook Street, Liverpool, 1866. Extensive use is made of floor-to-ceiling glass, enabling light to penetrate deeper into the building, thus maximizing floor space.

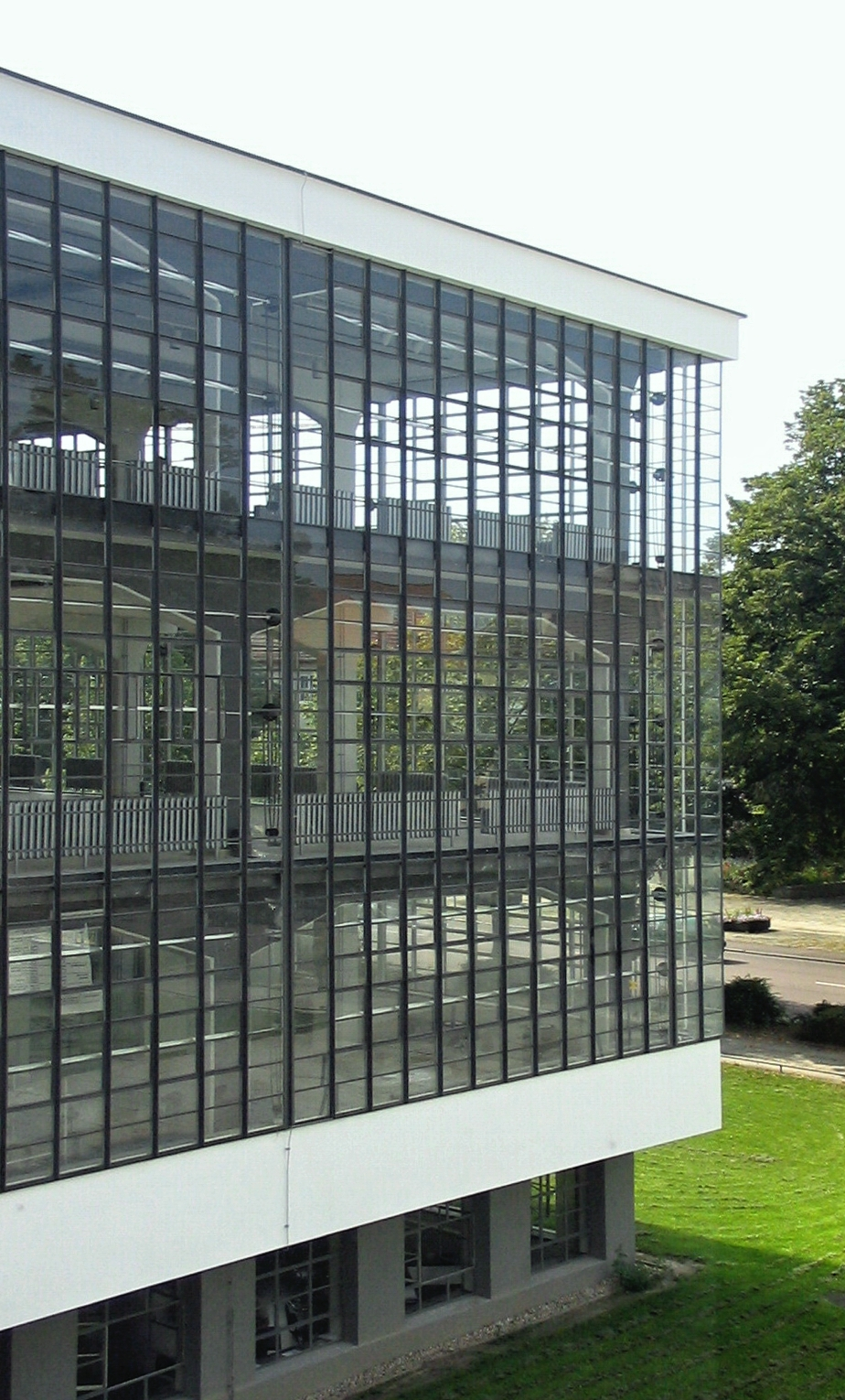
Glass curtain wall of Bauhaus Dessau, 1926

Historically, buildings were constructed of timber, masonry, or a combination of both. Their exterior walls were load-bearing, supporting much or all of the load of the entire structure. The nature of the materials resulted in inherent limits to a building's height and the maximum size of window openings.

The development and widespread use of structural steel and later reinforced concrete allowed relatively small columns to support large loads. The exterior walls could be non-load bearing, and thus much lighter and more open than load-bearing walls of the past. This gave way to increased use of glass as an exterior façade, and the modern-day curtain wall was born.

Post-and-beam and balloon framed timber structures effectively had an early version of curtain walls, for their frames supported loads that allowed the walls themselves to serve other functions, such as keeping weather out and allowing light in. When iron began to be used extensively in buildings in late 18th-century Britain, such as at Ditherington Flax Mill, and later when buildings of wrought iron and glass such as The Crystal Palace were built, the building blocks of structural understanding were laid for the development of curtain walls.

Oriel Chambers (1864) and 16 Cook Street (1866), both built in Liverpool, England, by local architect and civil engineer Peter Ellis, are characterised by their extensive use of glass in their facades. Toward the courtyards they boasted metal-framed glass curtain walls, which makes them two of the world's first buildings to include this architectural feature. Oriel Chambers is listed in the Guinness Book of Records as the earliest such building. The extensive glass walls allowed light to penetrate further into the building, utilizing more floor space and reducing lighting costs. Oriel Chambers comprises 43,000 sq ft (4,000 m^{2}) set over five floors without an elevator, which had only recently been invented and was not yet widespread. The Statue of Liberty (1886) features a thin, non-load-bearing copper skin. Extensive use of glass became required for large factory buildings to allow light for manufacture, sometimes making it seem like they had all glass facades.

An early example of an all-steel curtain wall used in the classical style is the Kaufhaus Tietz department store on Leipziger Straße, Berlin, built in 1901 (since demolished).

Some of the first curtain walls were made with steel mullions, and the polished plate glass was attached to the mullions with asbestos- or fiberglass-modified glazing compound. Eventually silicone sealants or glazing tape were substituted for the glazing compound. Some designs included an outer cap to hold the glass in place and to protect the integrity of the seals. The landmarks of curtain wall design as it came to dominate construction were the very different systems used by the United Nations Headquarters and the Lever House completed in 1952.

Ludwig Mies van der Rohe's curtain wall is one of the most important aspects of his architectural design. Mies first began prototyping the curtain wall in his high-rise residential building designs along Chicago's lakeshore, achieving the look of a curtain wall at 860-880 Lake Shore Drive Apartments. He finally perfected the curtain wall at 900–910 Lake Shore Drive, where the curtain is an autonomous aluminum and glass skin. After 900–910, Mies's curtain wall appeared on all of his subsequent high-rise building designs, including the Seagram Building in New York.

The widespread use of aluminium extrusions for mullions began during the 1970s. Aluminum alloys offer the unique advantage of being able to be easily extruded into nearly any shape required for design and aesthetic purposes. Today, the design complexity and shapes available are nearly limitless. Custom shapes can be designed and manufactured with relative ease. The Omni San Diego Hotel curtain wall in California, designed by architectural firm Hornberger and Worstel and developed by JMI Realty, is an example of a unitized curtain-wall system with integrated sunshades.

== Systems and principles ==
=== Stick systems ===
The vast majority of ground-floor curtain walls are installed as long pieces (referred to as sticks) between floors vertically and between vertical members horizontally. Framing members may be fabricated in a shop, but installation and glazing is typically performed at the jobsite.

=== Ladder systems ===
Very similar to a stick system, a ladder system has mullions which can be split and then either snapped or screwed together consisting of a half box and plate. This allows sections of curtain wall to be fabricated in a shop, effectively reducing the time spent installing the system onsite. The drawbacks of using such a system is reduced structural performance and visible joint lines down the length of each mullion.

=== Unitized systems ===
Unitized curtain walls entail factory fabrication and assembly of panels and may include factory glazing. These completed units are installed on the building structure to form the building enclosure. Unitized curtain wall has the advantages of: speed; lower field installation costs; and quality control within an interior climate-controlled environment. The economic benefits are typically realized on large projects or in areas of high field labor rates.

=== Rainscreen principle ===
A common feature in curtain wall technology, the rainscreen principle theorizes that equilibrium of air pressure between the outside and inside of the "rainscreen" prevents water penetration into the building. For example, the glass is captured between an inner and an outer gasket in a space called the glazing rebate. The glazing rebate is ventilated to the exterior so that the pressure on the inner and outer sides of the outer gasket is the same. When the pressure is equal across this gasket, water cannot be drawn through joints or defects in the gasket.

== Design concerns ==
A curtain wall system must be designed to handle all loads imposed on it as well as keep air and water from penetrating the building envelope.

=== Loads ===
The loads imposed on the curtain wall are transferred to the building structure through the anchors which attach the mullions to the building.

Dead load

Dead load is defined as the weight of structural elements and the permanent features on the structure. In the case of curtain walls, this load is made up of the weight of the mullions, anchors and other structural components of the curtain wall, as well as the weight of the infill material. Additional dead loads imposed on the curtain wall may include sunshades or signage attached to the curtain wall.

Wind load

Wind load is a normal force acting on the building as the result of wind blowing on the building. Wind pressure is resisted by the curtain wall system since it envelops and protects the building. Wind loads vary greatly throughout the world, with the largest wind loads being near the coast in hurricane-prone regions. For each project location, building codes specify the required design wind loads. Often, a wind tunnel study is performed on large or unusually-shaped buildings. A scale model of the building and the surrounding vicinity is built and placed in a wind tunnel to determine the wind pressures acting on the structure in question. These studies take into account vortex shedding around corners and the effects of surrounding topography and buildings.

Seismic load

Seismic loads in a curtain wall system are limited to the interstory drift induced on the building during an earthquake. In most situations, the curtain wall is able to naturally withstand seismic and wind induced building sway because of the space provided between the glazing infill and the mullion. In tests, standard curtain wall systems are typically able to withstand up to three inches (76 mm) of relative floor movement without glass breakage or water leakage.

Snow load

Snow loads and live loads are not typically an issue in curtain walls, since curtain walls are designed to be vertical or slightly inclined. If the slope of a wall exceeds 20 degrees or so, these loads may need to be considered.

Thermal load

Thermal loads are induced in a curtain wall system because aluminum has a relatively high coefficient of thermal expansion. This means that over the span of a couple of floors, the curtain wall will expand and contract some distance, relative to its length and the temperature differential. This expansion and contraction is accounted for by cutting horizontal mullions slightly short and allowing a space between the horizontal and vertical mullions. In unitized curtain wall, a gap is left between units, which is sealed from air and water penetration by gaskets. Vertically, anchors carrying wind load only (not dead load) are slotted to account for movement. Incidentally, this slot also accounts for live load deflection and creep in the floor slabs of the building structure.

Blast load

Accidental explosions and terrorist threats have brought on increased concern for the fragility of a curtain wall system in relation to blast loads. The bombing of the Alfred P. Murrah Federal Building in Oklahoma City, Oklahoma, has spawned much of the current research and mandates in regards to building response to blast loads. Currently, all new federal buildings in the U.S. and all U.S. embassies built on foreign soil must have some provision for resistance to bomb blasts.

Since the curtain wall is at the exterior of the building, it becomes the first line of defense in a bomb attack. As such, blast resistant curtain walls are designed to withstand such forces without compromising the interior of the building to protect its occupants. Since blast loads are very high loads with short durations, the curtain wall response should be analyzed in a dynamic load analysis, with full-scale mock-up testing performed prior to design completion and installation.

Blast resistant glazing consists of laminated glass, which is meant to break but not separate from the mullions. Similar technology is used in hurricane-prone areas for impact protection from wind-borne debris.

=== Air infiltration ===
Air infiltration is the air which passes through the curtain wall from the exterior to the interior of the building. The air is infiltrated through the gaskets, through imperfect joinery between the horizontal and vertical mullions, through weep holes, and through imperfect sealing. The American Architectural Manufacturers Association (AAMA) is an industry trade group in the U.S. that has developed voluntary specifications regarding acceptable levels of air infiltration through a curtain wall.

=== Water penetration ===
Water penetration is defined as water passing from the exterior of the building to the interior of the curtain wall system. Sometimes, depending on the building specifications, a small amount of controlled water on the interior is deemed acceptable. Controlled water penetration is defined as water that penetrates beyond the inner most vertical plane of the test specimen, but has a designed means of drainage back to the exterior. AAMA Voluntary Specifications allow for controlled water penetration while the underlying ASTM E1105 test method would define such water penetration as a failure. To test the ability of a curtain wall to withstand water penetration in the field, an ASTM E1105 water spray rack system is placed on the exterior side of the test specimen, and a positive air pressure difference is applied to the system. This set up simulates a wind driven rain event on the curtain wall to check for field performance of the product and of the installation. Field quality control and assurance checks for water penetration has become the norm as builders and installers apply such quality programs to help reduce the number of water damage litigation suits against their work.

=== Deflection ===
One of the disadvantages of using aluminum for mullions is that its modulus of elasticity is about one-third that of steel. This translates to three times more deflection in an aluminum mullion compared to a similar steel section under a given load. Building specifications set deflection limits for perpendicular (wind-induced) and in-plane (dead load-induced) deflections. These deflection limits are not imposed due to strength capacities of the mullions. Rather, they are designed to limit deflection of the glass (which may break under excessive deflection), and to ensure that the glass does not come out of its pocket in the mullion. Deflection limits are also necessary to control movement at the interior of the curtain wall. Building construction may be such that there is a wall located near the mullion, and excessive deflection can cause the mullion to contact the wall and cause damage. Also, if deflection of a wall is quite noticeable, public perception may raise undue concern that the wall is not strong enough.

Deflection limits are typically expressed as the distance between anchor points divided by a constant number. A deflection limit of L/175 is common in curtain wall specifications, based on experience with deflection limits that are unlikely to cause damage to the glass held by the mullion. Say that a given curtain wall is anchored at 12-foot (144 in) floor heights. The allowable deflection would then be 144/175 = 0.823 inches, which means the wall is allowed to deflect inward or outward a maximum of 0.823 inches at the maximum wind pressure. However, some panels require stricter movement restrictions, or certainly those that prohibit a torque-like motion.

Deflection in mullions is controlled by different shapes and depths of curtain wall members. The depth of a given curtain wall system is usually controlled by the area moment of inertia required to keep deflection limits under the specification. Another way to limit deflections in a given section is to add steel reinforcement to the inside tube of the mullion. Since steel deflects at one-third the rate of aluminum, the steel will resist much of the load at a lower cost or smaller depth.

Deflection in curtain wall mullions also differs from deflection of the building structure, whether concrete, steel, or timber. Curtain wall anchors must be designed to allow differential movement between the building structure and the curtain wall.

=== Strength ===
Strength (or maximum usable stress) available to a particular material is not related to its material stiffness (the material property governing deflection); it is a separate criterion in curtain wall design and analysis. This often affects the selection of materials and sizes for design of the system. The allowable bending strength for certain aluminum alloys, such as those typically used in curtain wall framing, approaches the allowable bending strength of steel alloys used in building construction.

=== Thermal criteria ===
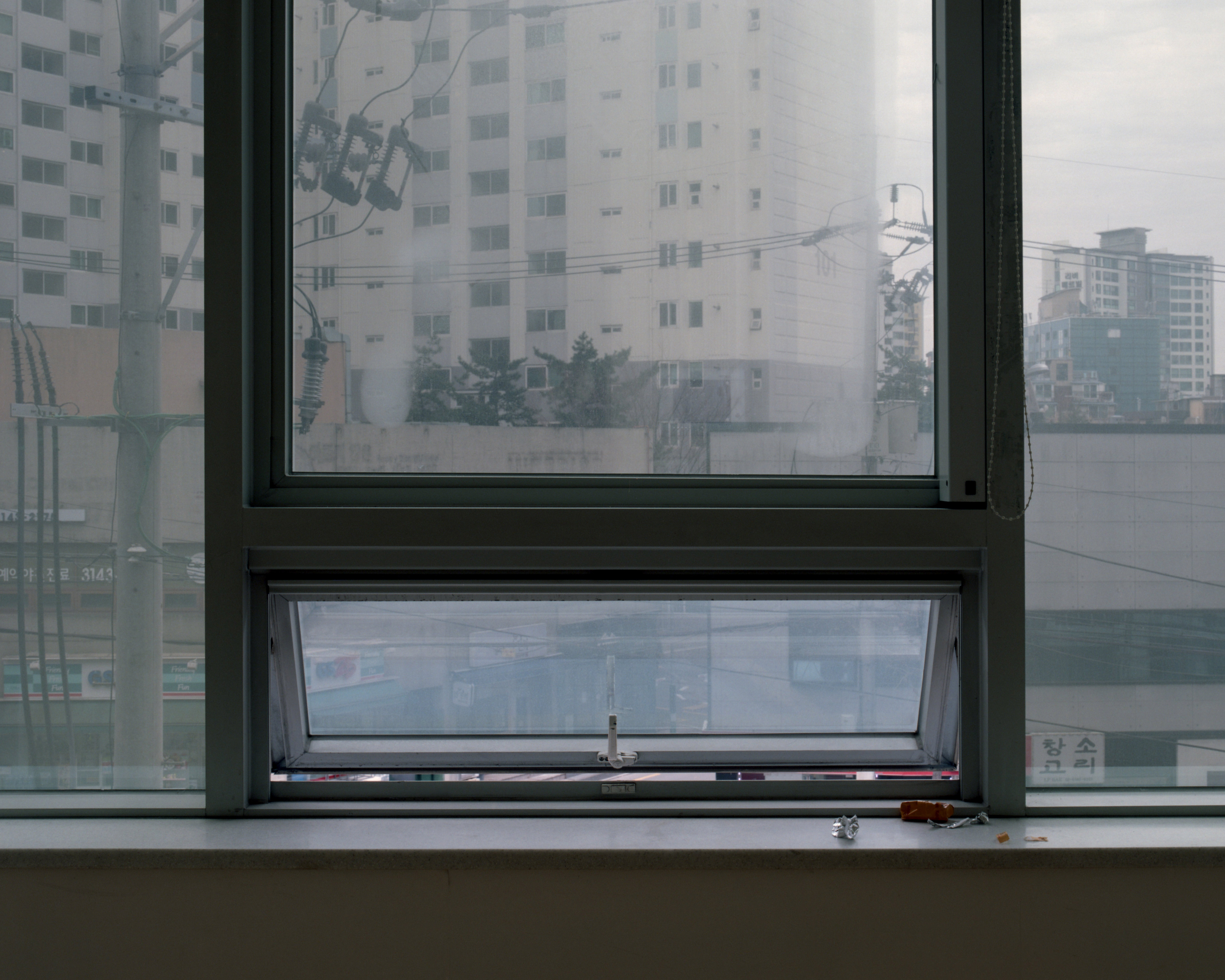
Condensation forms on the glass curtain wall

Relative to other building components, aluminum has a high heat transfer coefficient, meaning that aluminum is a very good conductor of heat. This translates into high heat loss through aluminum (or steel) curtain wall mullions. There are several ways to compensate for this heat loss, the most common way being the addition of thermal breaks. These are barriers between exterior metal and interior metal, usually made of polyvinyl chloride (PVC). These breaks provide a significant decrease in the thermal conductivity of the curtain wall. However, since the thermal break interrupts the aluminum mullion, the overall moment of inertia of the mullion is reduced and must be accounted for in the structural analysis and deflection analysis of the system.

Thermal conductivity of the curtain wall system is important because of heat loss through the wall, which affects the heating and cooling costs of the building. On a poorly performing curtain wall, condensation may form on the interior of the mullions. This could cause damage to adjacent interior trim and walls.

Rigid insulation is provided in spandrel areas to provide a higher R-value at these locations.

Thermally-broken mullions with double- or triple-glazed IGUs are often referred to as "high-performance" curtain walls. While these curtain wall systems are more energy-efficient than older, single-glazed versions, they are still significantly less efficient than opaque (solid) wall construction. For example, nearly all curtain wall systems, thermally-broken or otherwise, have a U-value of 0.2 or higher, which is equivalent to an R-value of 5 or lower.

== Infills ==
Infills are the large panels in the curtain wall between mullions. They are typically glass but may be made up of nearly any exterior building element, including metal panels, louvers, and photovoltaic panels. Infills are also called spandrels or spandrel panels.

=== Glass ===
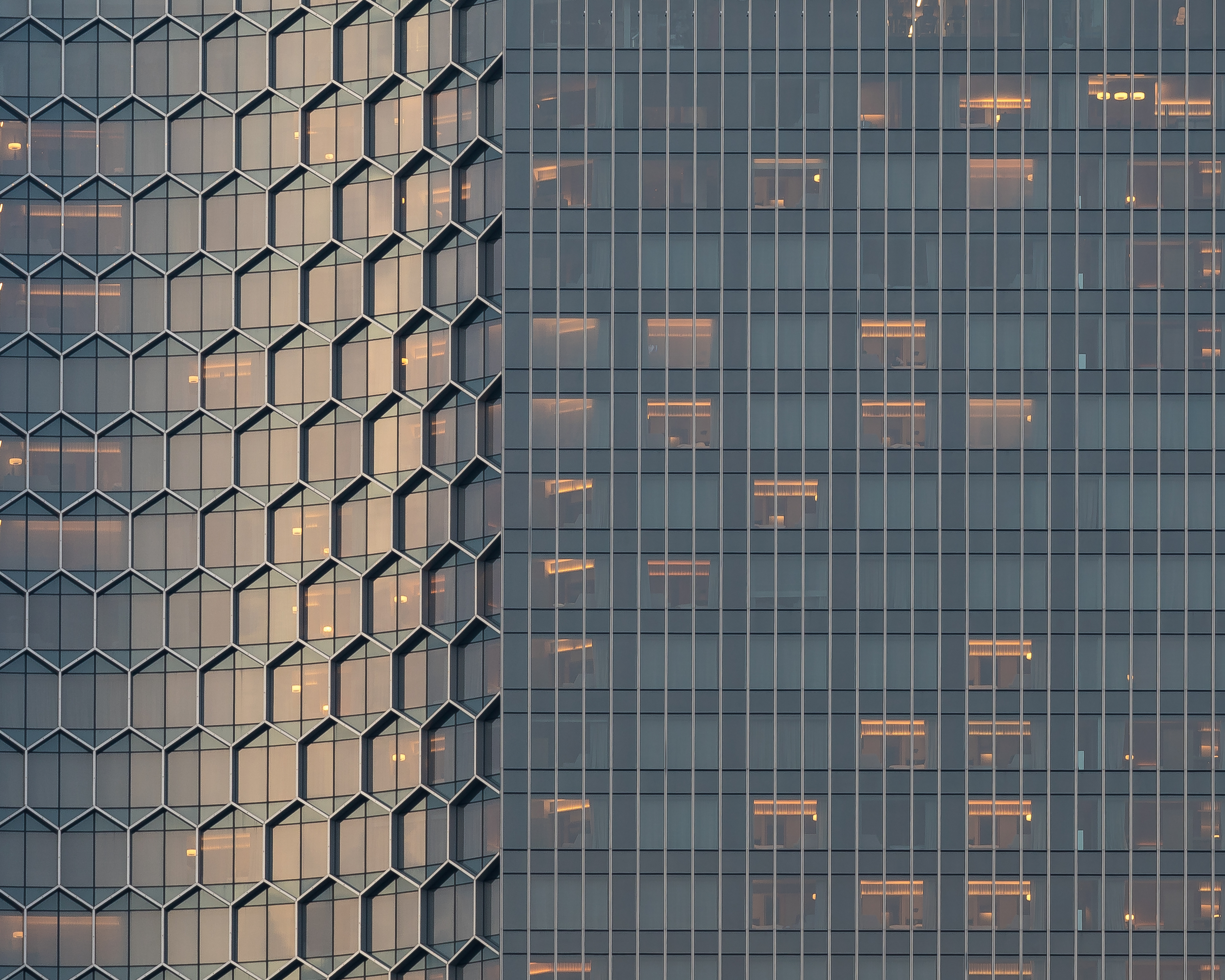
Glass curtain wall on the hotel Andaz in Singapore at sunset

Float glass is by far the most common curtain wall glazing type. It can be manufactured in an almost infinite combination of color, thickness, and opacity. For commercial construction, the two most common thicknesses are 1/4 inch (6.4 mm) monolithic and 1 inch (25 mm) insulating glass. 1/4 inch glass is typically used only in spandrel areas, while insulating glass is used for the rest of the building (sometimes spandrel glass is specified as insulating glass as well). The 1 inch insulation glass is typically made up of two 1/4-inch lites of glass with a 1/2 inch (13 mm) airspace. The gas inside is usually atmospheric air, but inert gases, such as argon or krypton, may be used for better thermal transmittance. In Europe, triple-pane insulating glass infill is now common. In Scandinavia, the first curtain walls with quadruple-pane have been built.

Larger thicknesses are typically employed for buildings or areas with higher thermal, relative humidity, or sound isolation requirements, such as laboratory areas or recording studios. In residential construction, thicknesses commonly used are 1/8 inch (3.2 mm) monolithic and 5/8 inch (16 mm) insulating glass.

The glass may be transparent, translucent, or opaque to varying degrees. Transparent glass is usually vision glass in a curtain wall. Spandrel or vision glass may also contain translucent glass for security or aesthetics. Opaque glass is used selectively to hide a column or spandrel beam or shear wall behind the curtain wall. Another method of hiding spandrel areas is through shadow box construction (providing a dark enclosed space behind the transparent or translucent glass). Shadow box construction creates a perception of depth behind the glass.

=== Stone veneer ===
Thin blocks (3 to 4 inches (76 to 102 millimetres)) of stone can be inset within a curtain wall system. The type of stone used is limited only by the strength of the stone and the ability to manufacture it in the proper shape and size. Common stone types used are: calcium silicate, granite, marble, travertine, limestone, and engineered stone. To reduce weight and improve strength, the natural stone may be attached to an aluminum honeycomb backing.

=== Panels ===
Metal panels can take various forms including stainless steel, aluminum plate; aluminum composite panels consisting of two thin aluminum sheets sandwiching a thin plastic interlayer; copper wall cladding, and panels consisting of metal sheets bonded to rigid insulation, with or without an inner metal sheet to create a sandwich panel. Other opaque panel materials include fiber-reinforced plastic (FRP) and terracotta. Terracotta curtain wall panels were first used in Europe, but only a few manufacturers produce high quality modern terracotta curtain wall panels.

=== Louvers ===
A louver is provided in an area where mechanical equipment located inside the building requires ventilation or fresh air to operate. They can also serve as a means of allowing outside air to filter into the building to take advantage of favorable climatic conditions and minimize the usage of energy-consuming HVAC systems. Curtain wall systems can be adapted to accept most types of louver systems to maintain the same architectural sightlines and style while providing desired functionality.

=== Windows and vents ===
Most curtain wall glazing is fixed, meaning that there is no access to the exterior of the building except through doors. However, windows or vents can be glazed into the curtain wall system as well, to provide required ventilation or operable windows. Nearly any window type can be made to fit into a curtain wall system.

== Fire safety ==
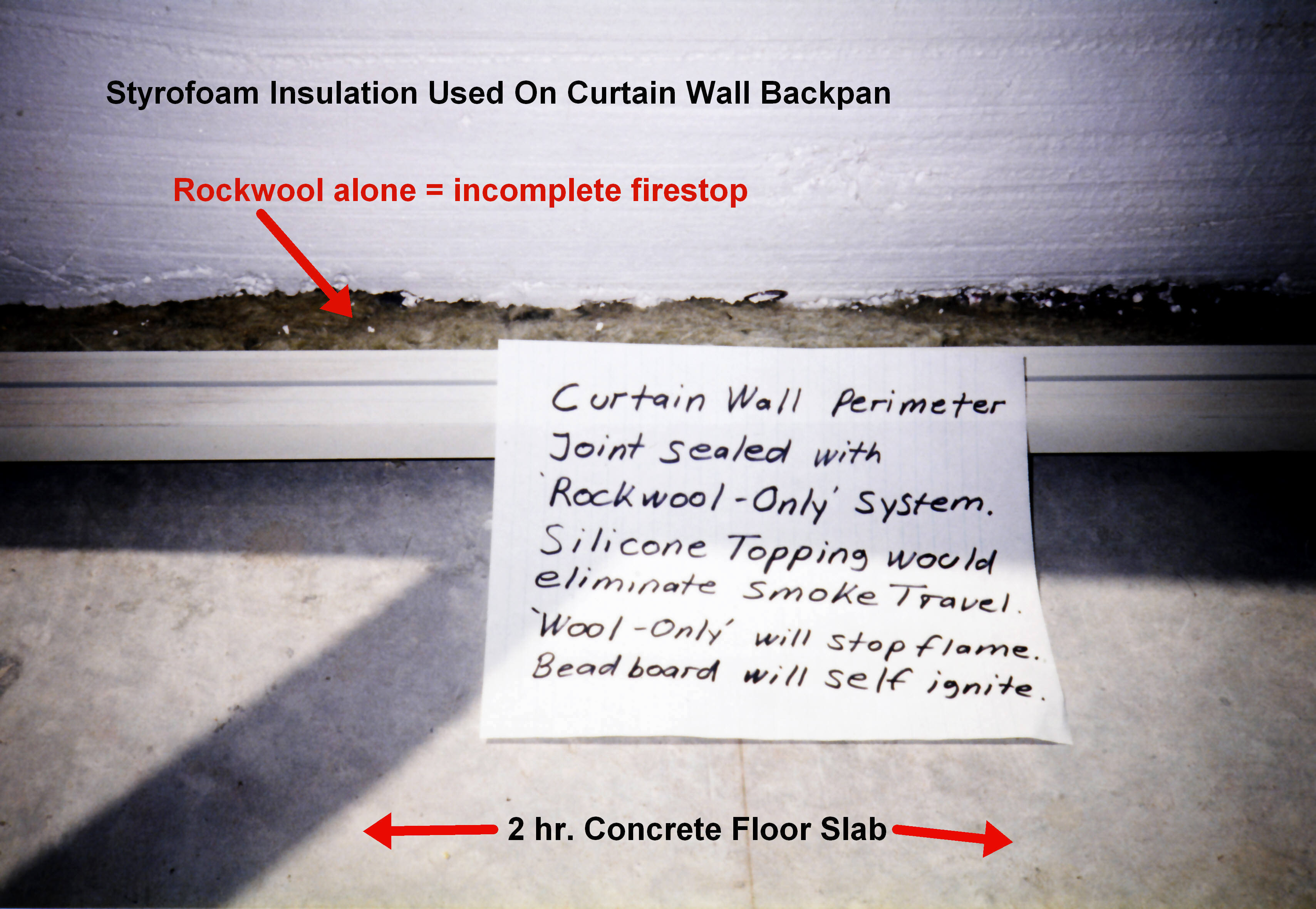
Combustible polystyrene insulation in point contact with sheet metal backban. Incomplete firestop in the perimeter slab edge, made of rockwool without topcaulking.

Firestopping at the perimeter slab edge, which is a gap between the floor and the curtain wall, is essential to slow the passage of fire and combustion gases between floors. Spandrel areas must have non-combustible insulation at the interior face of the curtain wall. Some building codes require the mullion to be wrapped in heat-retarding insulation near the ceiling to prevent the mullions from melting and spreading the fire to the floor above. The firestop at the perimeter slab edge is considered a continuation of the fire-resistance rating of the floor slab. The curtain wall itself, however, is not ordinarily required to have a rating. This causes a quandary as compartmentalization (fire protection) is typically based upon closed compartments to avoid fire and smoke migrations beyond each engaged compartment. A curtain wall by its very nature prevents the completion of the compartment (or envelope). The use of fire sprinklers has been shown to mitigate this matter. As such, unless the building is sprinklered, fire may still travel up the curtain wall, if the glass on the exposed floor is shattered from heat, causing flames to lick up the outside of the building.

Falling glass can endanger pedestrians, firefighters and firehoses below. An example of this is the 1988 First Interstate Tower fire in Los Angeles, California. The fire leapfrogged up the tower by shattering the glass and then consuming the aluminum framing holding the glass. Aluminum's melting temperature is 660 °C, whereas building fires can reach 1,100 °C. The melting point of aluminum is typically reached within minutes of the start of a fire.

Fireman knock-out glazing panels are often required for venting and emergency access from the exterior. Knock-out panels are generally fully tempered glass to allow full fracturing of the panel into small pieces and relatively safe removal from the opening.

== Maintenance and repair ==
Curtain walls and perimeter sealants require maintenance to maximize service life. Perimeter sealants, properly designed and installed, have a typical service life of 10 to 15 years. Removal and replacement of perimeter sealants require meticulous surface preparation and proper detailing.

Aluminum frames are generally painted or anodized. Care must be taken when cleaning areas around anodized material as some cleaning agents will destroy the finish. Factory applied fluoropolymer thermoset coatings have good resistance to environmental degradation and require only periodic cleaning. Recoating with an air-dry fluoropolymer coating is possible but requires special surface preparation and is not as durable as the baked-on original coating. Anodized aluminum frames cannot be "re-anodized" in place but can be cleaned and protected by proprietary clear coatings to improve appearance and durability.

Stainless steel curtain walls require no coatings, and embossed, as opposed to abrasively finished, surfaces maintain their original appearance indefinitely without cleaning or other maintenance. Some specially textured matte stainless steel surface finishes are hydrophobic and resist airborne and rain-borne pollutants. This has been valuable in the American Southwest and in the Mideast for avoiding dust, as well as avoiding soot and smoke staining in polluted urban areas.

== See also ==
- Mullion wall
- Insulated glazing
- Quadruple glazing
- Copper in architecture
