= John Wellborn Root =

American architect (1850–1891)

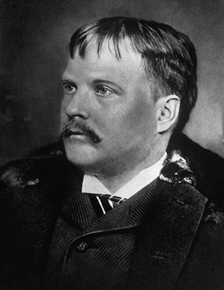
- Born: January 10, 1850; Lumpkin, Georgia, US
- Died: January 15, 1891 (aged 41); Chicago, Illinois, US
- Occupation: Architect
- Spouses: Mary Louise Walker (m. 1879; died 1879) Dora Louise Monroe (m. 1882)
- Children: John Wellborn Root Jr.
- Relatives: Harriet Monroe (sister-in-law)
- Awards: AIA Gold Medal (1958)
- Practice: Burnham and Root
- Buildings: Reliance Building
- Projects: Grand Central Depot

John Wellborn Root (January 10, 1850 – January 15, 1891) was an American architect who was based in Chicago with Daniel Burnham. He was one of the founders of the Chicago School style. Two of his buildings have been designated National Historic Landmarks (the Rookery, and the Reliance); others have been designated Chicago landmarks and listed on the National Register of Historic Places. In 1958, he was posthumously awarded the AIA Gold Medal.

== Early years and education ==
John Wellborn Root was born in 1850 in Lumpkin, Georgia, the son of Sidney Root, a planter, and his wife, Mary Harvey Clark. He was named after a maternal uncle, Marshall Johnson Wellborn. Root was raised in Atlanta, where he was first educated at home. When Atlanta fell to the Union during the American Civil War, Root's father sent young Root and one other boy on a steamer to the United Kingdom, where his father, Sidney, had a shipping business based in Liverpool, England. His mother and sister went to Cuthbert, Georgia.

While in Liverpool, Root studied at a school in Claremount, near Liverpool. His later design work was said to have been influenced by the pioneering work of Liverpool architect Peter Ellis, who designed and built the world's first two metal-framed, glass curtain-walled buildings, Oriel Chambers (1864) and 16 Cook Street (1866).

After Root returned to the U.S., he earned an undergraduate degree from New York University in 1869. After graduation, he took a job with the architect James Renwick Jr. of Renwick and Sands of New York as an unpaid apprentice. Later he took a position with John Butler Snook in New York. While working for Snook, Root was a construction supervisor on the original Grand Central Depot, predecessor to Warren and Wetmore's Grand Central Terminal. Root was greatly influenced by the architecture of Henry Hobson Richardson.

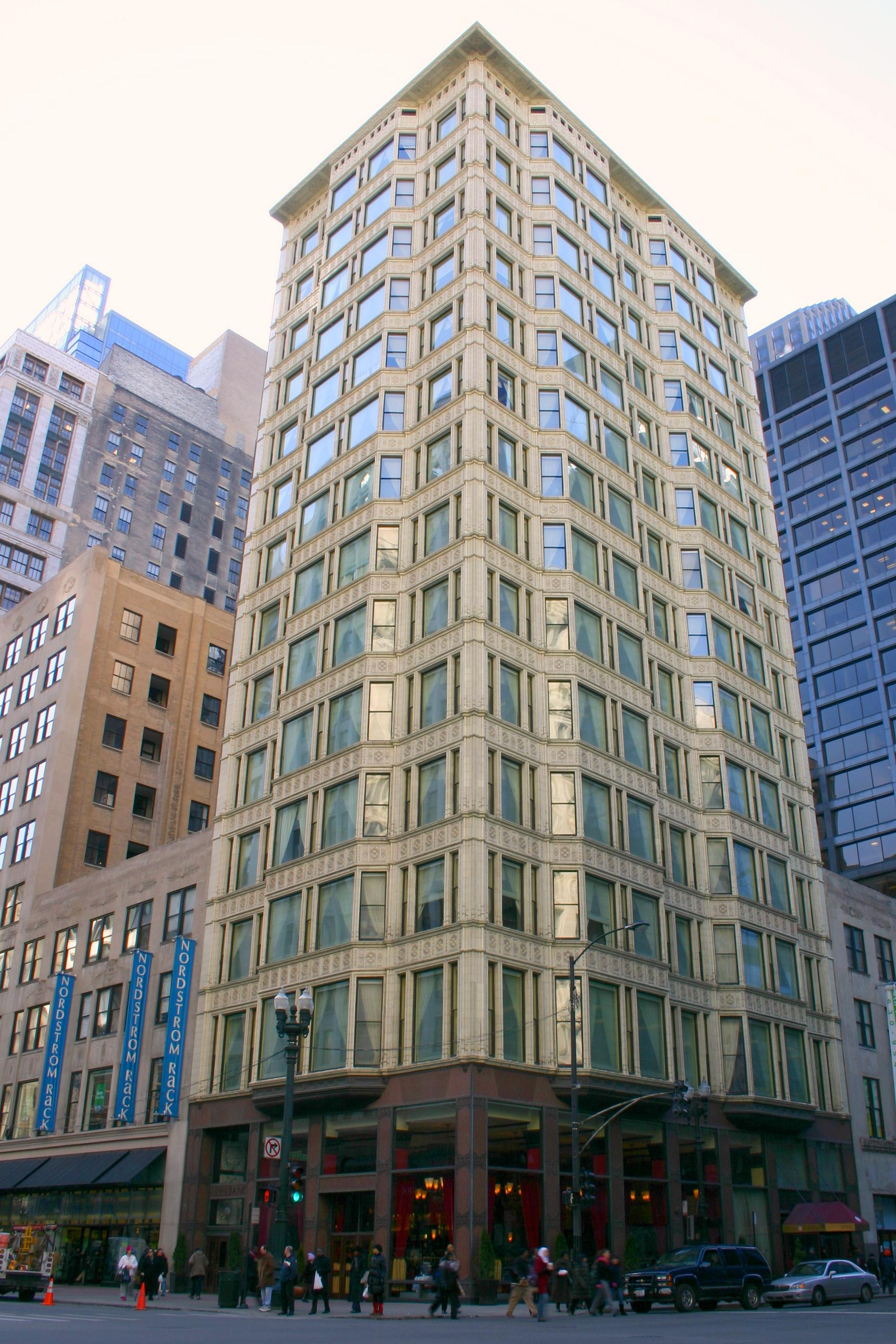
Reliance Building, Chicago, 1890

== Chicago and career ==
In 1871, Root moved to Chicago, where he was employed as a draftsman in an architectural firm. He met Daniel Burnham and two years later in 1873, the young men formed the firm of Burnham and Root; they worked together for 18 years. During the economic downturn in 1873, Root earned extra income on jobs with other firms and as the organist at the First Presbyterian Church.

== Mature years (after 1873) ==
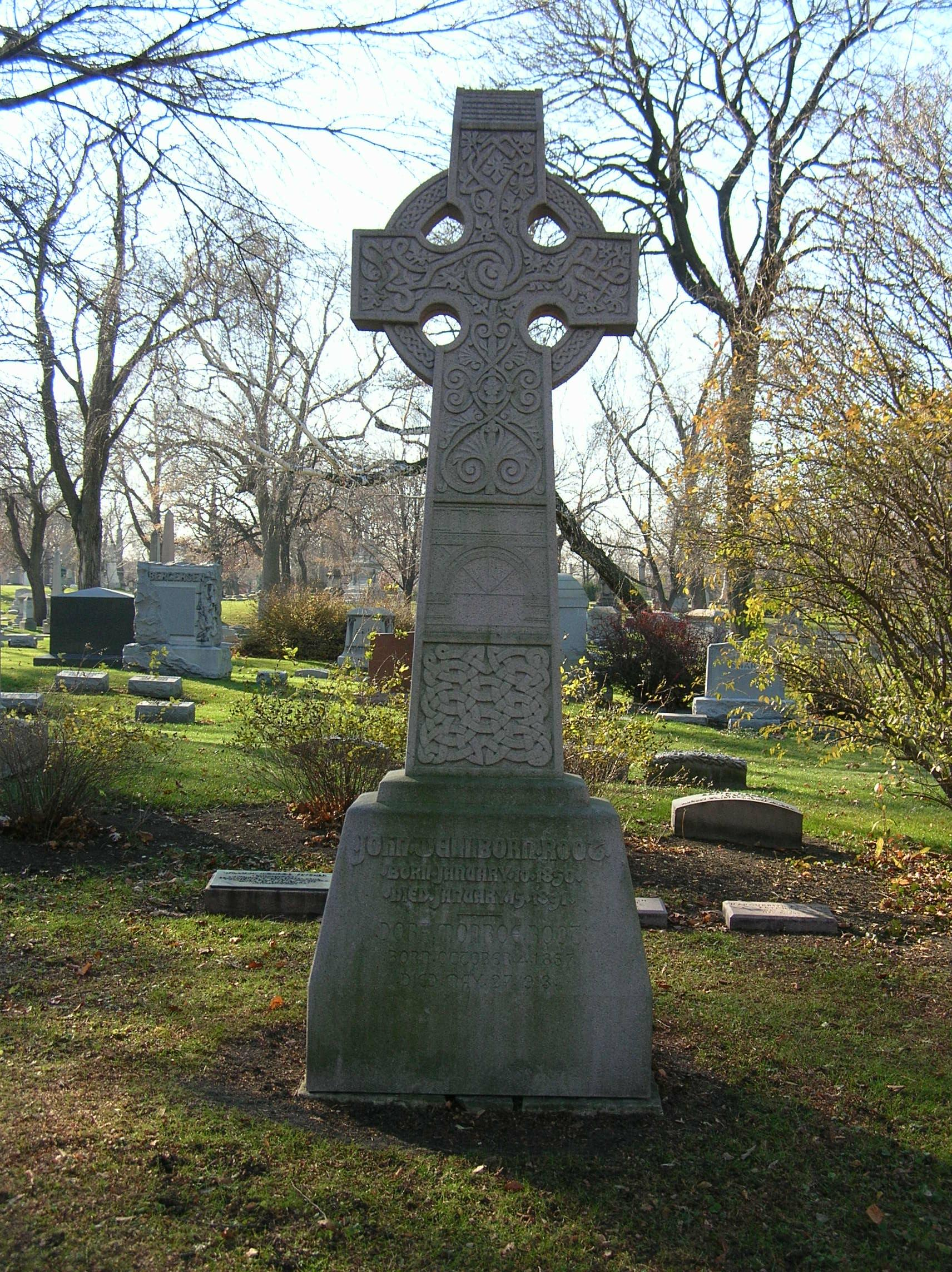
Grave marker of John Wellborn Root in Graceland Cemetery

Root developed the floating raft system of interlaced steel beams, to create a foundation for tall buildings that would not sink in Chicago's marshy soil. Root's first use of this revolutionary system was for the Montauk Building in 1882. He later transferred use of the steel frame to the vertical load-bearing walls in the Phenix Building of 1887, in imitation of William LeBaron Jenney's Home Insurance Building of 1885.

Root, Burnham, Dankmar Adler, and Louis Sullivan formed the Western Association of Architects because they felt slighted by East Coast architects. Root served as president in 1886. In 1887, he was elected a director of the national American Institute of Architects. His work from his prime years has been recognized for significance by being designated as National Historic Landmark, National Register of Historic Places, and Chicago landmarks.

He worked on the plan for the World's Columbian Exposition in Chicago. Before it was constructed, Root died of pneumonia in 1891 at the age of 41. He was buried in Uptown's Graceland Cemetery.

== Marriage and family ==
Root married Mary Louise Walker in 1879, but she died of tuberculosis six weeks later. In 1882, he married for a second time, to Dora Louise Monroe (sister of Harriet Monroe). Their son John Wellborn Root Jr. also practiced in Chicago as an architect. Root's sister-in-law, Harriet Monroe, authored the biography, John Wellborn Root: A Study of His Life and Work (1896).

== Significant buildings ==
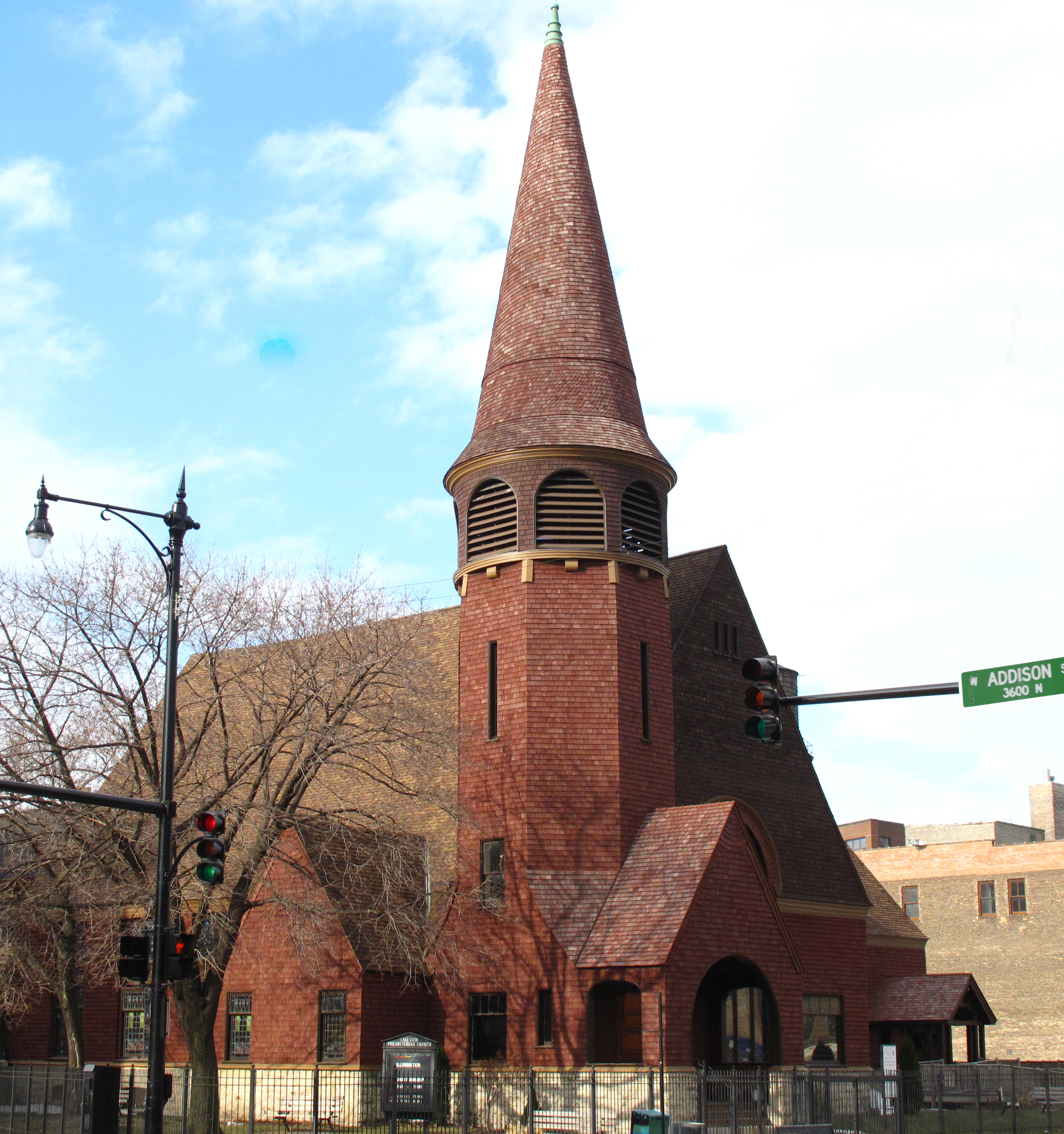
Lake View Presbyterian Church, 1888

- Grannis Block (1880) Chicago (destroyed)
- St. Gabriel's Church (1880) Chicago
- Montauk Building (1882–1883) Chicago (destroyed)
- Rookery Building (1885) Chicago, National Historic Landmark (NHL)
- Phoenix (Phenix) Building (1887) Chicago (destroyed)
- Lake View Presbyterian Church (1888) Chicago
- William Chick Scarritt House (1888), NRHP
- Monadnock Building (1889), Chicago, National Register of Historic Places (NRHP)
- Society for Savings Building, Cleveland, (1889), NRHP
- Reliance Building (1889) Chicago, ground floor only, NHL
- Keokuk Union Depot (1891) Keokuk, Iowa, NRHP
- Temperance Temple (1892) Chicago (destroyed)
