= Peter Ellis (architect) =

British architect

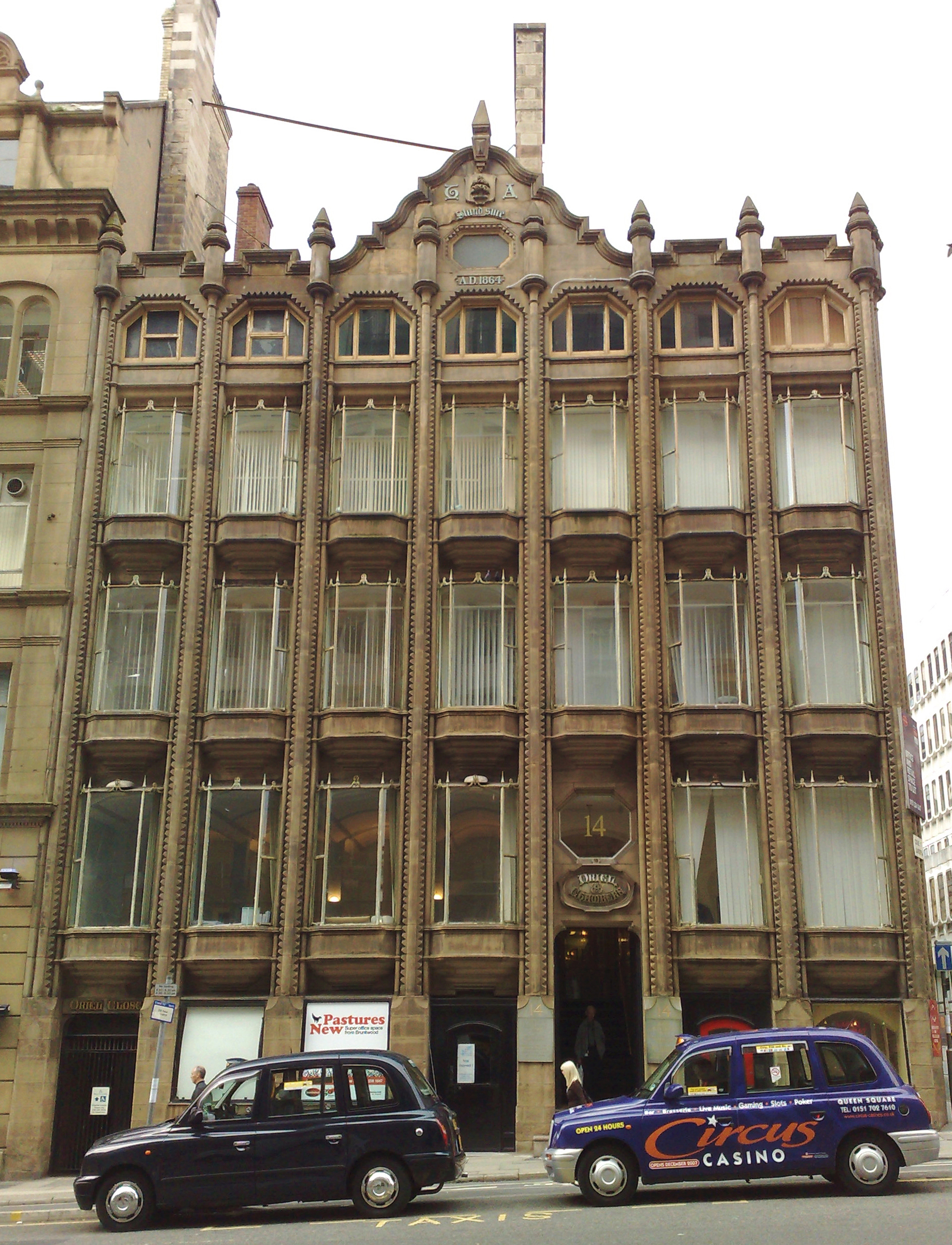
Oriel Chambers

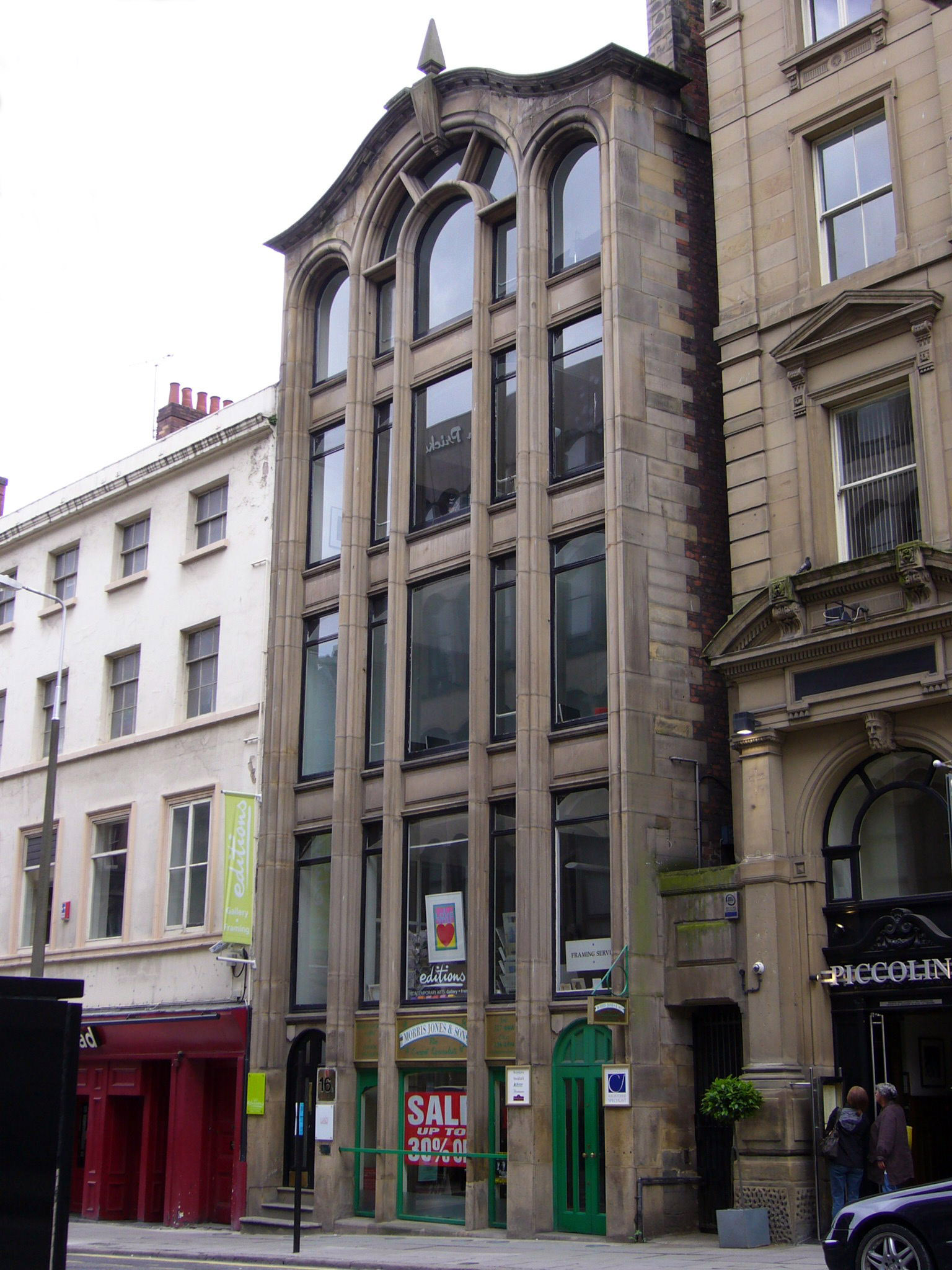
16 Cook Street

Peter Ellis (1805–1884) was a British architect from Liverpool and inventor of the paternoster lift. He is best known for designing Oriel Chambers, built in 1864, which is the world's first building to feature a metal-framed glass curtain wall. For this achievement he appears in the Guinness Book of Records.

From the mid-1840s he lived at 40 Falkner Square, a house which he designed and on which an English Heritage Blue Plaque is now sited.

== Buildings ==
Peter Ellis designed Oriel Chambers in 1864 at the corner of Water Street and Covent Garden in Liverpool, considered by many architectural historians to be one of the most influential buildings of its age, a precursor of the modernist style in architecture and one of the earliest attempts to break away from the classical tradition of commercial architecture. It was described by Charles Reilly, Professor of Architecture at Liverpool University as the "oddest building in Liverpool, at once so logical and so disagreeable...as a cellular habitation for the human insect it is a distinct asset to the town," and by Nikolaus Pevsner as "one of the most remarkable buildings of its date in Europe."

His other well-known commission was 16 Cook Street, Liverpool, of 1866. This building has been noted for its "surprisingly modern" spiral staircase, cantilevered out from the main building and clad with sheets of iron and glass.

From evidence in the Liverpool Mercury he is known to have had commissions for at least four other buildings (1856-1874), whilst the Corporation Lease Registers reveal that his early career (1833-1844) involved his design and construction of a variety of houses for sale, rent or personal use (see Career).

== Career ==
Peter Ellis was born on 1 August 1805 at Shaw's Brow (subsequently renamed William Brown Street), the third son in a family of seven born to Peter Ellis senior and Ann (née Appleton). The family moved to Primrose Hill in 1807 where Peter's father was involved in the construction of courts, and to Gloucester Street (now buried beneath Lime Street Station) in 1811 where his father worked with other builders in developing the area. In 1822 they moved to Low Hill and it was whilst living there that Peter subsequently met Mary Helen Syers who was living in Everton Village and whom he married in 1836.

Although Peter first appeared in Gore's Liverpool Directory in 1834 as an architect with an office in Renshaw Street, prior to that he would have learned his trade working with his father on several terraces of properties in Audley Street (1824), Kent Square (1830), and Great George Square / Upper Pitt Street (1832). Then in 1833 Peter Ellis the Younger of Liverpool Surveyor first appeared in the Corporation Lease Register regarding terraces of property to be built along the south east side of Great George Square and into Cookson Street.

In 1835 Peter acquired a lease on property and neighbouring building land in Sandon Street (originally a part of Chatham Street). One of the properties became Peter and Mary's first home, and it was whilst they were living there that Peter submitted designs for the 1839 St George's Hall competition subsequently won by Harvey Lonsdale Elmes. In 1843 Peter acquired a lease upon which he built 78 Canning Street and in the following year he obtained a lease on neighbouring land upon which he built what became 40 Falkner Square, the house in which he and Mary lived for the remainder of Peter's life.

In 1845 Peter moved his office to Clayton Square and it was whilst he was there, in 1856, that he was commissioned to design St Saviour's National Schools in Canning Street (the site now lies beneath the Liverpool Women's Hospital), and, later, the Hardman Street Homoeopathic Dispensary, opened in 1860.

In the early 1860s Peter moved offices, briefly to Bank Buildings and then for a longer period to Orange Court (they lay on opposite sides of Castle Street), and it was in 1863 that a fire destroyed offices and a warehouse at the junction of Water Street and Covent Garden. The building was owned by Rev. Thomas Anderson and it was from him that Peter received the commission to design Oriel Chambers, the fire-proof replacement that was constructed upon the site (1864–65). Whilst still at Orange Court, Peter was then commissioned by the accountants Paterson and Thomas to design 16 Cook Street (1866–68), also a replacement for a pre-existing building.

Quentin Hughes suggested that it was possible that Peter's career as an architect was adversely affected by criticism of Oriel Chambers, such as that which appeared in The Builder of 20 January 1866, where it was described as a "large agglommeration of protruding plate glass bubbles", a "vast abortion" without any aesthetic qualities. He also noted that although Peter practised for a further eighteen years after the Cook Street commission, his entry in the 1867 edition of Gore's Directory of Liverpool describes him as both architect and civil engineer, whilst in the 1884 directory the term "civil engineer" precedes "architect", suggesting that architecture became a secondary strand in his career.

The extent to which the Oriel Chambers criticism was of primary significance in influencing either Peter's future career or interests remains unclear. After The Builder article he went on to design a Welsh Baptist Chapel in Hall Lane and an office/warehouse in School Lane, whilst, by 1865 (if not earlier), he had already become sufficiently interested in engineering to begin producing patents on a variety of topics, the most significant of which concerned the invention of a continuously moving lift which he subsequently installed in Oriel Chambers in 1869.

Peter moved his office from Orange Court to Oriel Chambers in 1871, and it was there that he continued to practice as an architect, valuer, surveyor and civil engineer, with the Liverpool Mercury containing reports and advertisements concerning his work up to May 1884. He died at the age of 79 at his home at 40 Falkner Square on 20 October 1884, the death certificate recording endocarditis (inflammation of the lining membrane of the heart) and pneumonia as the causes. He was buried on 23 October, and the Liverpool Daily Post the following day carried a warm tribute to him, of which this extract is representative: "The deceased gentleman was held in high esteem by the members of his own profession and solicitors and others with whom he had business relations...Mr. Ellis, for more than half a century, was at the head of the leading practice in his way of business in Liverpool, and was ever ready with his kindly advice to those who sought it." Peter outlived all his siblings but he and Mary died without having had the joy of bringing up a son or daughter. They lie at peace together in Toxteth Cemetery.

== Influence ==
Peter Ellis's work may have influenced that of the American architect John Wellborn Root who came to Liverpool when 16 Cook Street was being constructed. For example, in the Rookery Building, Chicago, Root used a glass and iron spiral staircase similar to that in 16 Cook Street.

Quentin Hughes has suggested that Ellis's career would have been very different if, like Root, he had gone to Chicago where his use of oriel windows to provide interior daylighting was adopted and exploited by American architects.

"Oriel Chambers, along with the work of Kahn, were real touchstones for the practice" of Arup Associates.

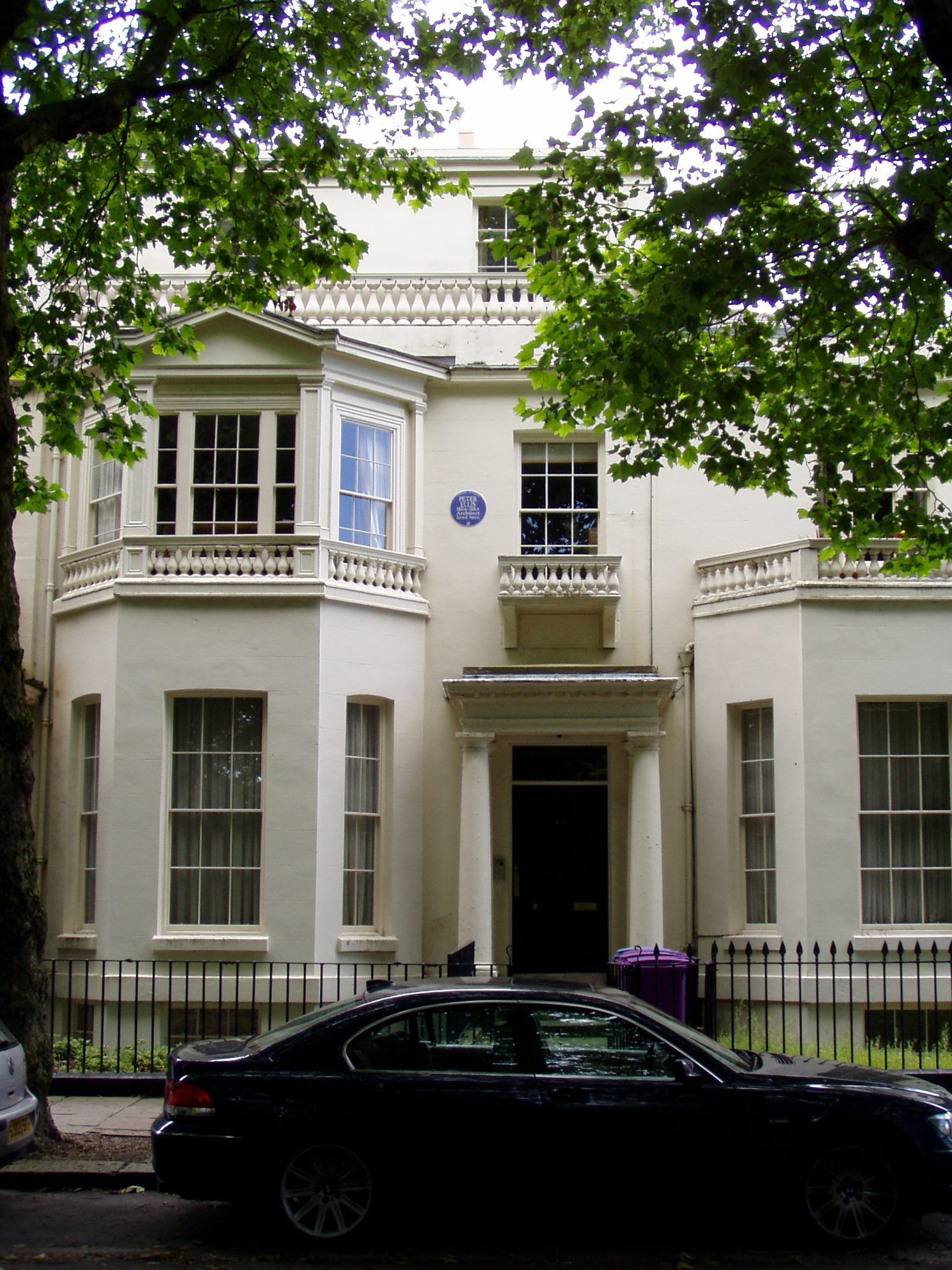
Ellis' residence, 40 Falkner Square, Liverpool
