= Montauk Building =

Office skyscraper in Chicago, Illinois

Coordinates: 41.8805°N 87.6319°W

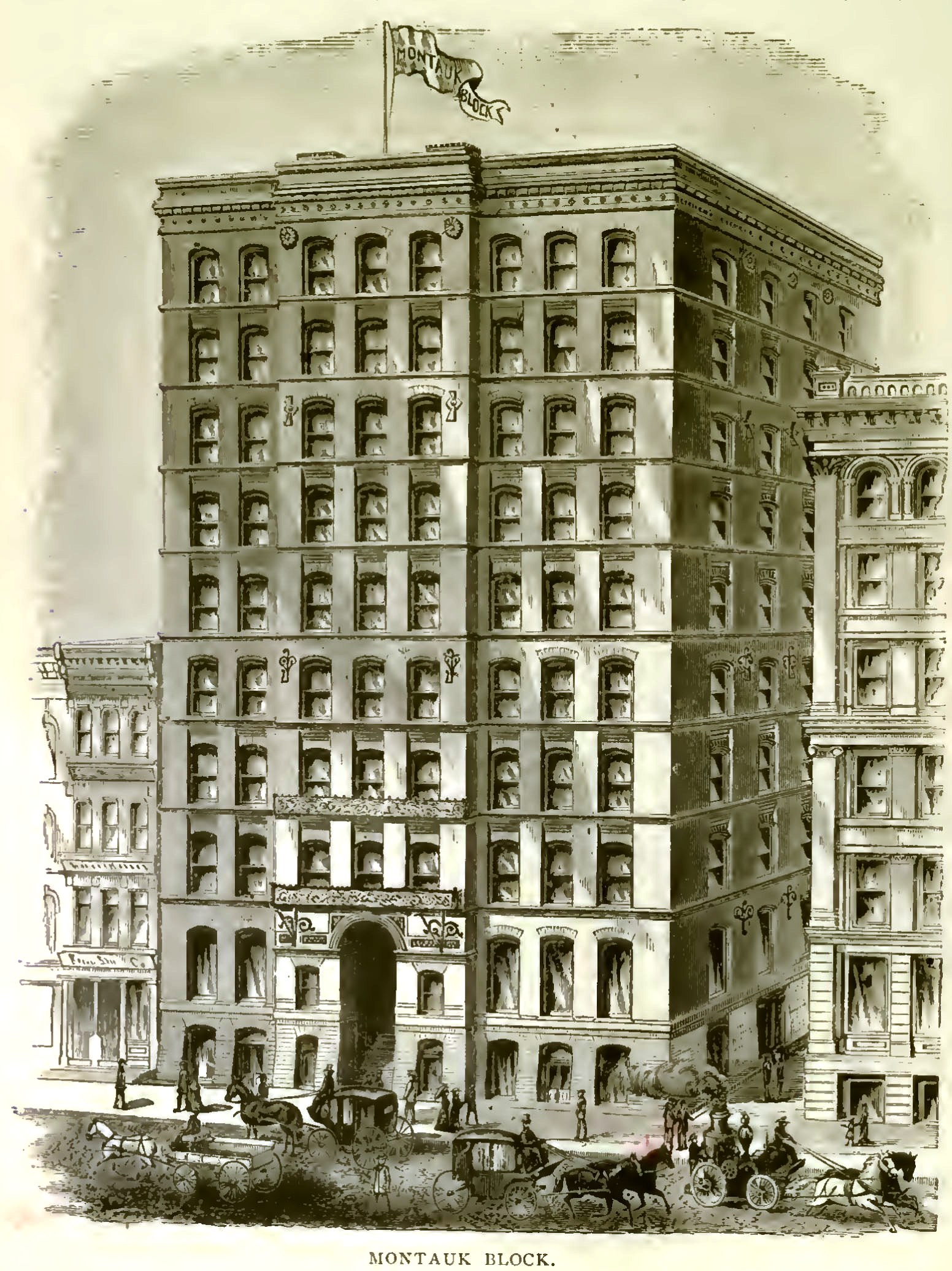
- Illustration of Montauk block, circa 1886. Originally published in Andreas' History of Chicago.
- Interactive map of the Montauk Building area

General information
- Architectural style: Chicago architecture
- Location: Chicago
- Construction started: 1882
- Construction stopped: 1883
- Demolished: 1902

Design and construction
- Architects: John Wellborn Root Sr. and Daniel Burnham

The Montauk Building – also referred to as Montauk Block – was a high-rise building in Chicago, Illinois.

== History ==
Designed by John Wellborn Root Sr. and Daniel Burnham, it was built in 1882–1883, and was demolished in 1902. According to Thomas Tallmadge, "What Chartres was to the Gothic cathedral, the Montauk Block was to the high commercial building".

In his non-fiction book set at the World's Columbian Exposition, The Devil in the White City (2003), author Erik Larson claims that the Montauk became the first building to be called a "skyscraper" (Larson 2003: 29). In his 1974 monograph Burnham of Chicago, Thomas Hines makes a similar claim.

The Montauk is also the first building in the world where construction continued through the evenings, and allegedly was the first building in Chicago to not have winter stop construction efforts.

Other early high-rise buildings in the US, according to Scientific American, December 1997: the Equitable Building (1868–70), the Western Union Building (1872–75) and the Tribune Building (1873–75), all in New York City.

A list of Chicago buildings from the University of Illinois-Chicago archives gives the following information about the Montauk building: "At 115 Monroe Street, has a frontage of 90 feet (27 m) and a depth of 180 feet (55 m). It is 130 feet (40 m) high, in 10 stories, of steel construction, on heavy foundations, with thick walls. It has 150 offices, 300 occupants, and 2 passenger elevators. Erected in 1882, at a cost of $325,000; the first high steel building in Chicago."

From 1903–1965, the First National Bank Building occupied the site. In 1965, this was demolished to make way for First National Plaza (now called Chase Tower).

== See also ==
- Chicago architecture
- Daniel Burnham
- John Wellborn Root
