= Grundy's Northern Pride =

- Developed by: Working Wonders TV Ltd
- Presented by: John Grundy
- Country of origin: United Kingdom
- Original language: English
- No. of episodes: 19

Production
- Producer: Steve Robins
- Production locations: North West England, North East England, North Yorkshire
- Running time: 25 mins approx.

Original release
- Network: ITV1 (Granada & Tyne Tees regions only)
- Release: 9 January 2007 – 10 January 2008

Related
- Grundy's Wonders

Grundy's Northern Pride is an ITV1 Tyne Tees/Granada series about architecture, presented by John Grundy. A follow-up to Grundy's Wonders, the series covers a wider area than that series (including north-west England as well as the north-east).

Beginning in early 2007, Northern Pride was broadcast on Tuesdays at 7.30pm (the ITV regional timeslot. The "Great Boot of History" (awarded to architecture he disliked) and the "Grundy's Wonder" award (for his favourites) do not feature in Northern Pride.

== Episodes ==
=== Series 1 ===
- Episode 1: "Pride in the North" (9 January 2007)
  Featuring Astley Hall, Chorley; and the listed buildings Oriel Chambers and 16 Cook Street, Liverpool.
- Episode 2: "Churches and Chapels" (16 January 2007)
- Episode 3: "Castles" (23 January 2007)
  Featuring Carlisle Castle; Dunstanburgh Castle; Bolton Castle; Lancaster Castle; Raby Castle
- Episode 4: "Country Houses" (30 January 2007)
- Episode 5: "Traditional Seaside (6 February 2007)
  Featuring seaside towns Scarborough and Blackpool.
- Episode 6: "Working Seaside (13 February 2007)
  Highlighting "the dangerous sea" from the past.
- Episode 7: "Countryside" (27 February 2007)
  Examining variety in the building of northern farmsteads.
- Episode 8: "Back Streets" (6 March 2007)
- Episode 9: "Capital of the North" (13 March 2007)

=== Series 2 ===
- Episode 1: "Village Halls" (3 January 2008)
- Episode 2: "Railways" (10 January 2008)
  Featuring Puffing Billy at Beamish Museum's Pockerley Waggonway.
- Episode 3: "Anglo Saxons and Vikings" (17 January 2008)
- Episode 4: "Waterways" (24 January 2008)
- Episode 5: "Stairs" (31 January 2008)
- Episode 6: "Colour" (7 February 2008)
- Episode 7: "Parks" (14 February 2008)
- Episode 8: "Lighting" (21 February 2008)
- Episode 9: "Markets" (28 February 2008)
- Episode 10: "Iron & Steel" (6 March 2008)
