= Spar box =

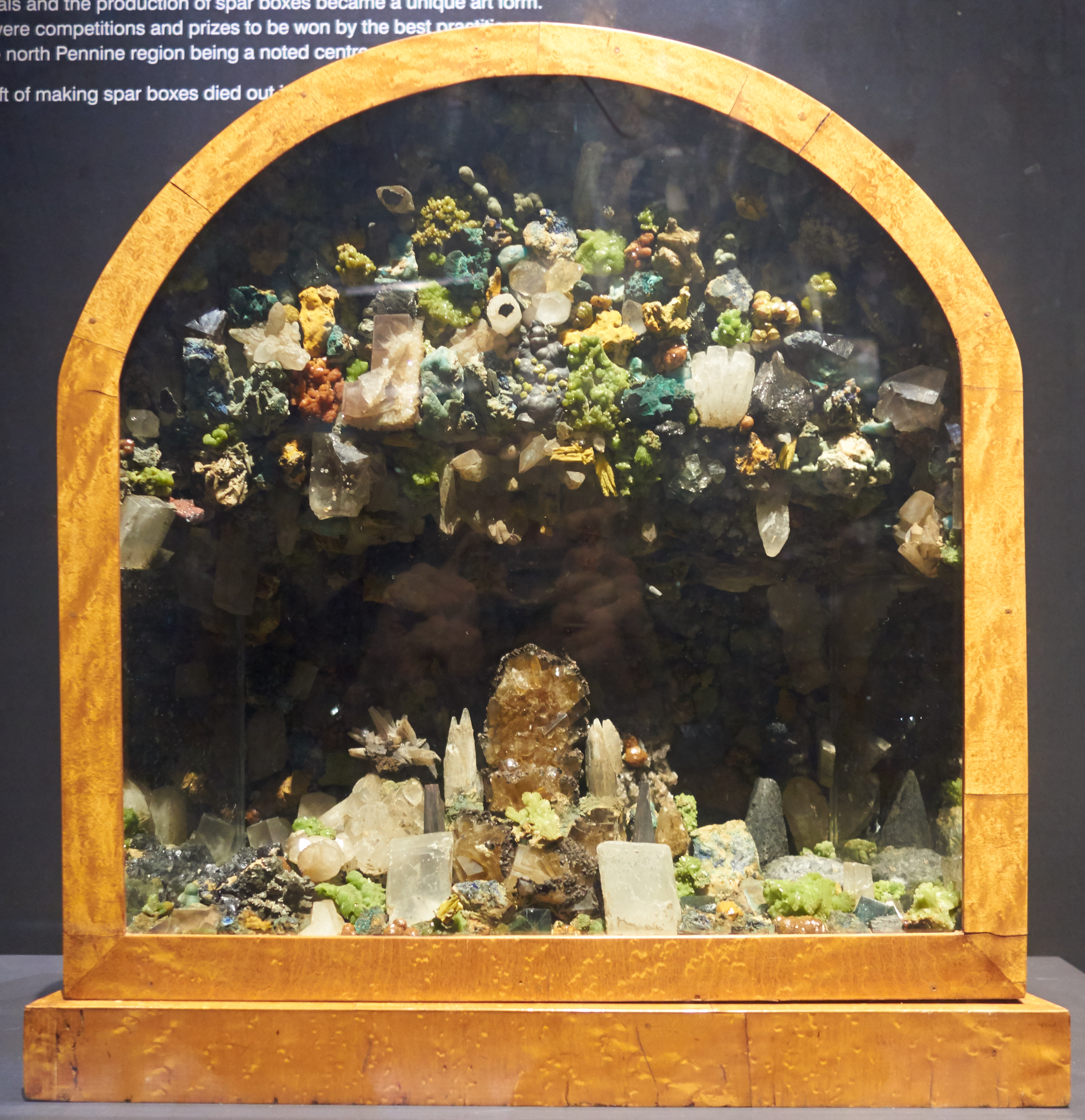
Spar Box at Ulster Museum

Spar boxes are a type of folk art, crafted by miners to display minerals and crystals they have found.
