= John Grundy (television presenter) =

British TV presenter & author (born 1946)

- Born: 1946 (age 78–79); Carlisle, Cumberland, England
- Occupation(s): TV presenter, author
- Spouse: Judi
- Children: 3
- Website: John Grundy - Friends of Beamish Tyne Tees

John Grundy (born 1946) is a television presenter and author. His work mainly features North East England.

== Biography ==
Grundy was born in 1946 in Carlisle, Cumberland. He taught in north-east schools from 1970. He became a lecturer in English Literature at South Tyneside College.

He was strongly influenced by reading Nikolaus Pevsner's Buildings of England series of architectural guides. In the late 1980s he worked for the Historic Buildings and Monuments Commission for England, before beginning a more public career as a writer and television presenter on architecture, especially that of Northern England.

He does live commentaries aboard the Shields Ferry, which cruises up and down the River Tyne from South Shields to Newcastle during the Summer. He is also chairman of the Friends of Beamish.

== Books ==
In the late 1990s Grundy edited and expanded the new edition of Pevsner's Northumberland, in the Buildings of England series.

In 2003 he published Northern Pride, which featured "the very best of northern architecture from cathedrals to chip shops".

== Television ==
Between 1987 and 1996, Grundy appeared as a presenter on the BBC North East series, 'Townscape'. He presented the popular Town Portraits which were later transmitted by BBC Two, and were amongst the first films transmitted on BBC International Satellite Television.

Grundy Goes... (1996–99) broadcast on Tyne Tees partly involved Grundy becoming the interesting historical characters found in the histories of the buildings he visited.

Townscape was on BBC One North East & Cumbria. Grundy's Wonders another, longer-running Tyne Tees series, Grundy explored architecture in the north-east, as well as Cumbria and Yorkshire. Grundy's Northern Pride has been broadcast since 2007 in the Tyne Tees and Granada Television regions and covers the same area as Grundy's Wonders plus North West England. Steve Robins, who produced all of Grundy's TV programmes from 1999, left Tyne Tees in 2005 to found the production company Working Wonders TV, which produced the last series of Grundy's Wonders, and Grundy's Northern Pride.

One episode of BBC Four's Travels with Pevsner series featured Grundy visiting sites previously visited by Nikolaus Pevsner in the 1950s and 1960s.

Since 2010 Grundy has presented a regular series for BBC Look North called Grundy's North, aired from BBC North East and Cumbria.
