= Chicago and North Western Railway Depot =

The Chicago and North Western Railway Depot may refer to one of the following former and active train stations:

- Chicago and Northwestern Railway Depot -- Glencoe, Illinois
- Chicago and North Western Railroad Depot (Norwood Park, Chicago)
- Chicago and Northwestern Depot (Sycamore, Illinois)
- Chicago and Northwestern Depot (Wilmette, Illinois)
- Chicago and North Western Passenger Depot, Wall Lake, Iowa
- Chicago and North Western Railway Passenger Depot, Green Bay, Wisconsin
- Chicago and Northwestern Railroad Depot (Ironwood, Michigan)
- Chicago and Northwestern Railroad Depot (Fond du Lac, Wisconsin)

== See also ==
- Chicago and North Western Railway
