= Watertown station (Wisconsin) =

Historic railroad in Watertown, Wisconsin

Watertown
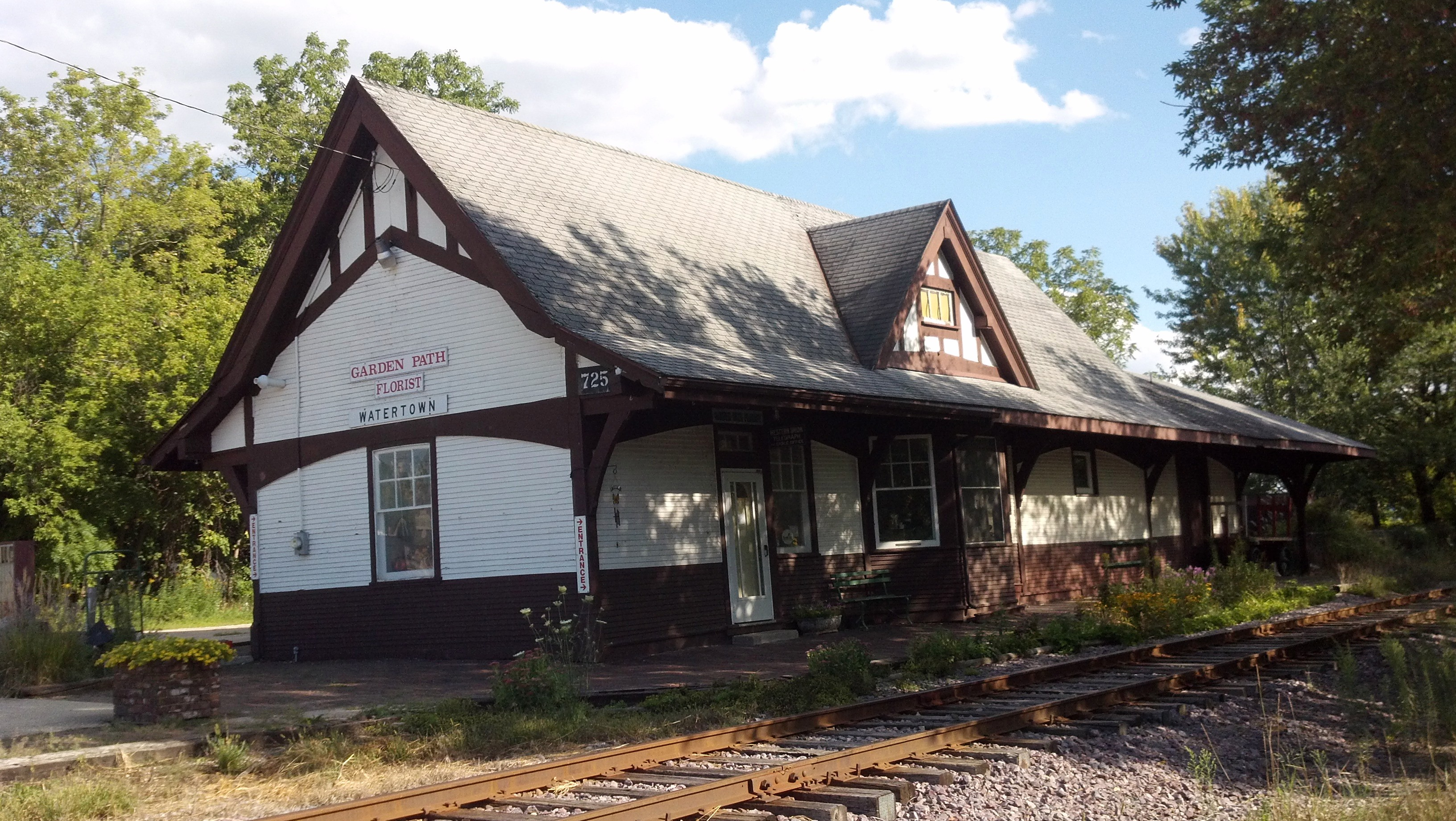
- The depot with "Watertown" still written on the outside

General information
- Location: 725 West Main Street, Watertown, Wisconsin
- Coordinates: 43°11′40″N 88°44′05″W
- System: Former Chicago and North Western Railway and Milwaukee Road station

Construction
- Structure type: At-grade
- Architect: Charles Sumner Frost
- Architectural style: Victorian

History
- Opened: 1853 (MILW), 1903 (C&NW)
- Closed: June 1950 (passenger); 1976 (freight)

Services
Preceding station	Chicago and North Western Railway	Following station
Johnson Creek toward Janesville	Janesville – Fond du Lac	Clyman toward Fond du Lac
Preceding station	Milwaukee Road	Following station
Reeseville toward Seattle or Tacoma	Main Line	Ixonia toward Chicago
Hubbleton toward Madison	Madison – Milwaukee via Watertown	Ixonia toward Milwaukee
Terminus	Suburban Service Watertown – Milwaukee	Ixonia toward Milwaukee
- Chicago and North Western Depot
- U.S. National Register of Historic Places
- Location within Wisconsin
- Location: 725 West Main Street, Watertown, Wisconsin, United States
- Coordinates: 43°11′40″N 88°44′05″W
- Area: 0.3 acres (0.12 ha)
- Built: 1903
- Architect: Charles Sumner Frost
- Architectural style: Victorian
- NRHP reference No.: 79000086
- Added to NRHP: March 28, 1979
Location

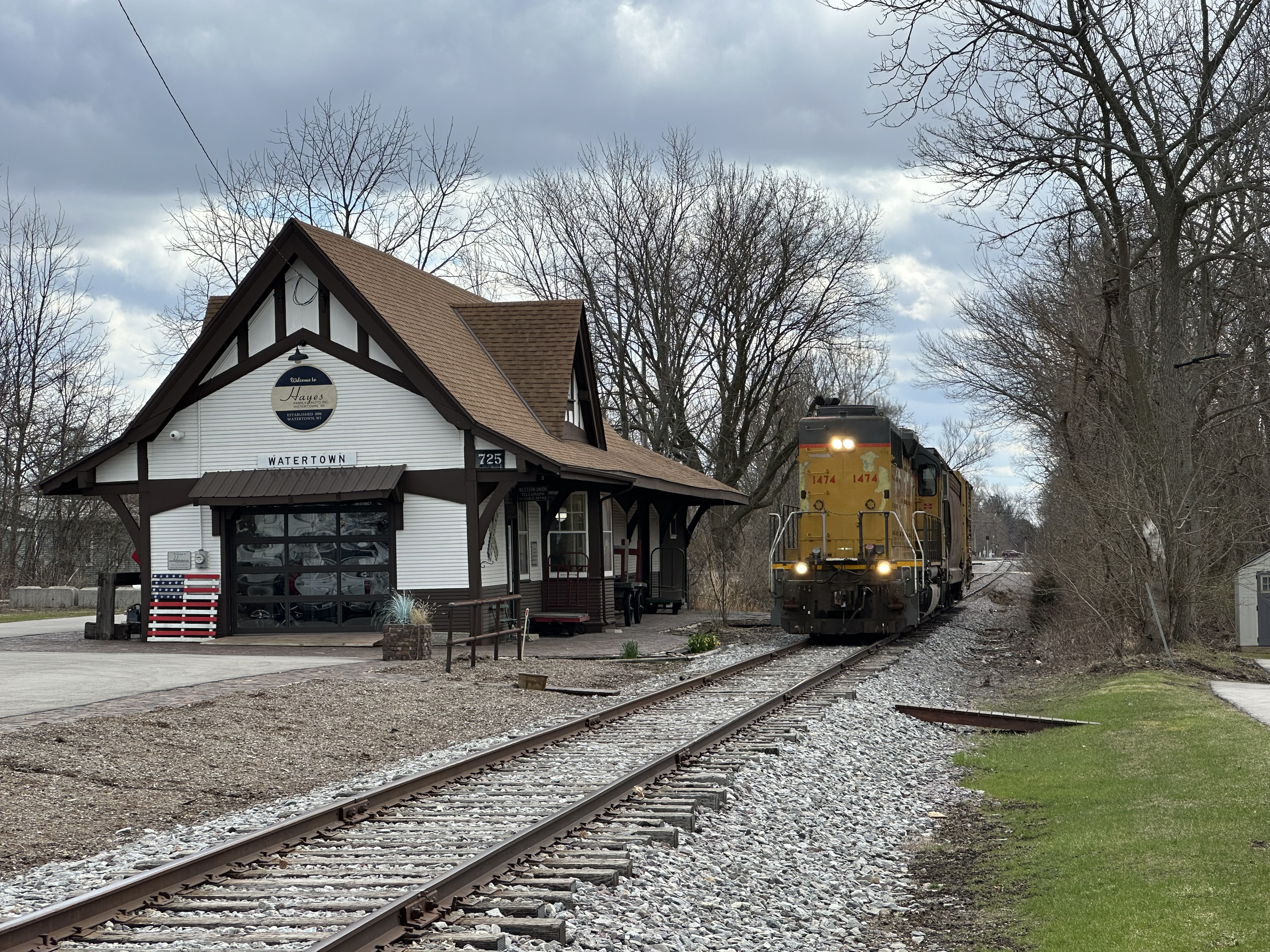
Former Chicago & North Western Watertown Depot with Union Pacific Train Returning from Jefferson WI

The Watertown Depot in Watertown, Wisconsin, United States, is a railroad depot built in 1903 and operated by the Chicago and North Western Railway and the Milwaukee Road. The station served passengers from 1903 to June 1950. Afterwards, it served freight trains until 1976. It has since been converted into a florist shop, and most recently, a used car dealership. The Union Pacific Railroad's single-tracked Clyman Subdivision remains in front of the depot. The Canadian Pacific Kansas City’s main line is to the right.

The building was listed on the National Register of Historic Places in 1979 and on the State Register of Historic Places in 1989.
