= Charles Sumner Frost =

American architect (1856–1931)

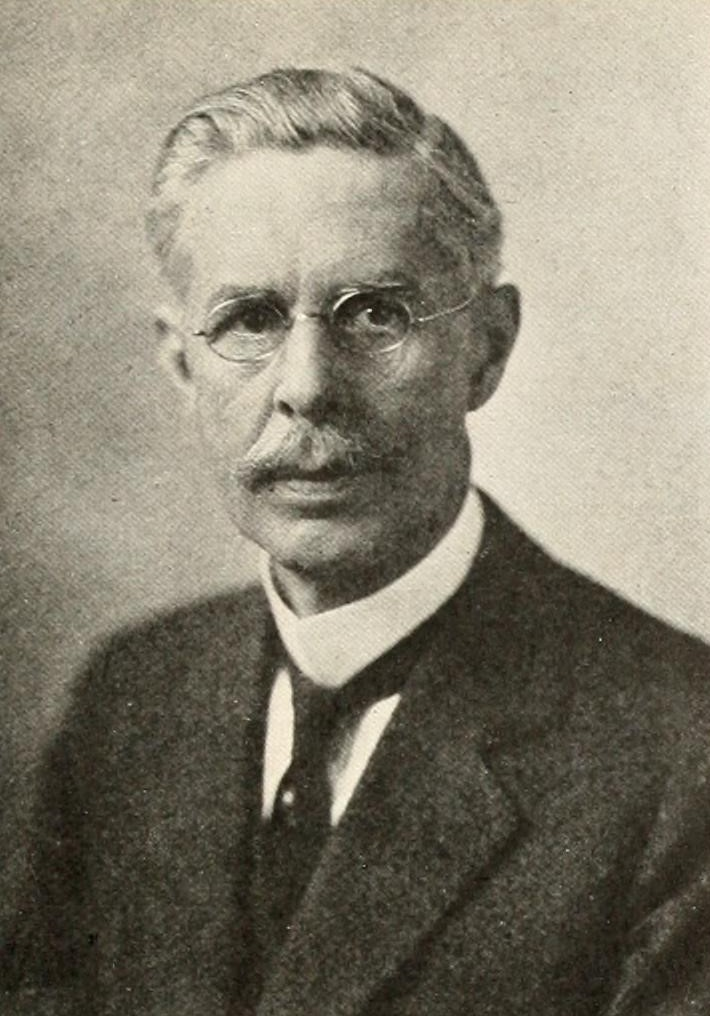
- Born: May 31, 1856; Lewiston, Maine, U.S.
- Died: December 11, 1931 (aged 75); Chicago, Illinois, U.S.
- Resting place: Rosehill Cemetery
- Education: Massachusetts Institute of Technology
- Occupation: Architect
- Spouse: Mary Hughitt (m. 1897)
- Children: 3

Charles Sumner Frost (May 31, 1856 – December 11, 1931) was an American architect. He is best known as the architect of Navy Pier and for designing over 100 buildings for the Chicago and North Western Railway.

== Biography ==
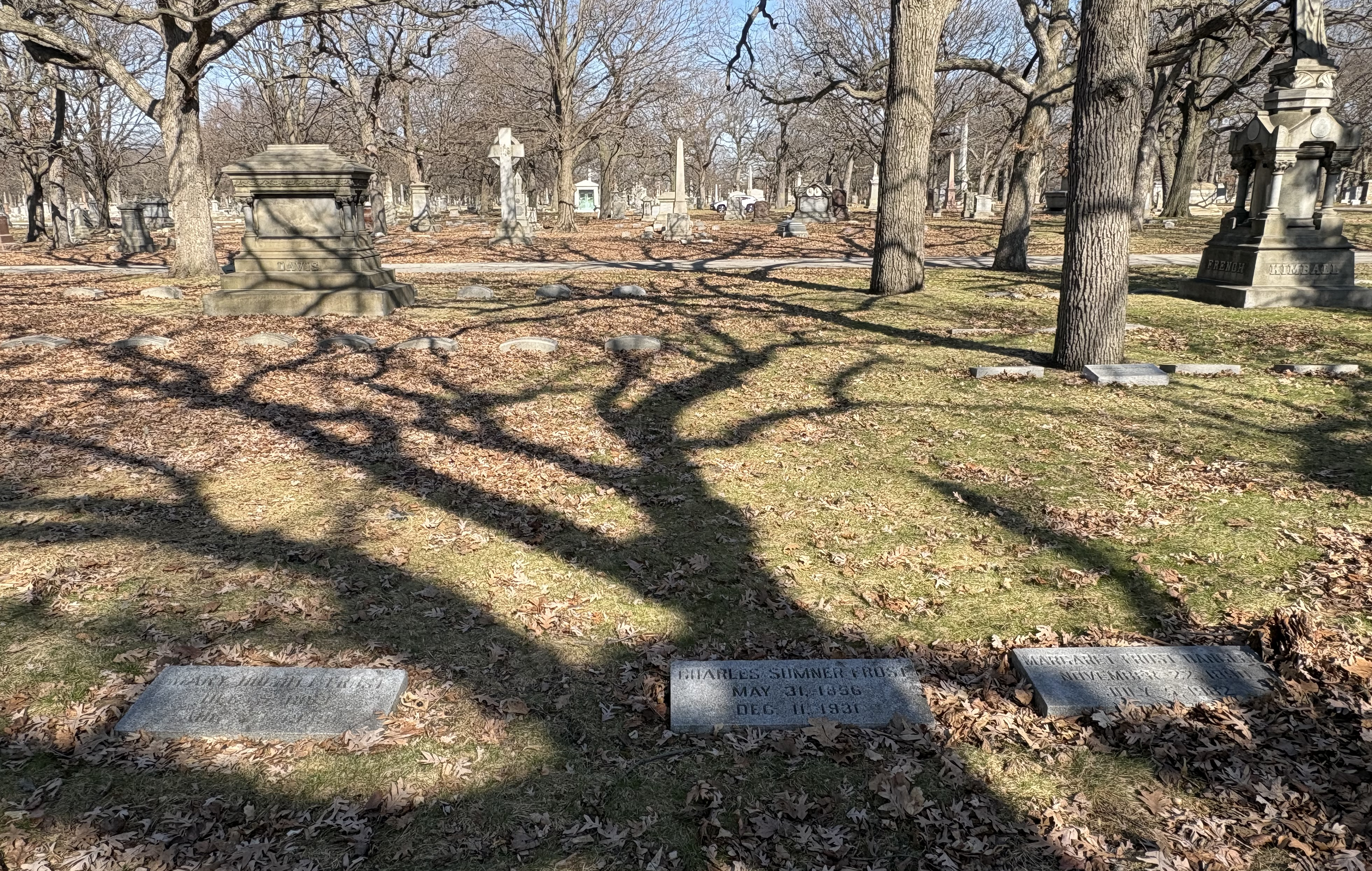
Frost's grave at Rosehill Cemetery

Born in Lewiston, Maine, Frost was first a draftsman in Boston, and graduated from the Massachusetts Institute of Technology in 1876. While working in Boston he worked for the firm of Peabody and Stearns from 1876 to 1881. He moved to Chicago in 1882, when he began a partnership with Henry Ives Cobb. Together, they established the firm Cobb and Frost, which was active from 1882 to 1898. After the partnership ended, he worked alone. Frost married Mary Hughitt, a daughter of Marvin Hughitt, the President of the Chicago and North Western Railroad, in 1897. On January 1, 1898, he partnered with his brother-in-law, Alfred Hoyt Granger, to form the firm of Frost and Granger. Frost and Granger were known for their designs of train stations and terminals, including the now-demolished Chicago and North Western Terminal. Frost designed 127 buildings for the Chicago and North Western Railroad alone.

After Frost and Granger dissolved in 1910, Frost continued to work independently, designing such structures as the Navy Pier Auditorium. Frost was a Fellow of the American Institute of Architects. He retired on December 31, 1928, and died on December 11, 1931, in Chicago. He was buried at Rosehill Cemetery.

The city of Frost, Minnesota, was named for Charles S. Frost.

== Notable buildings ==
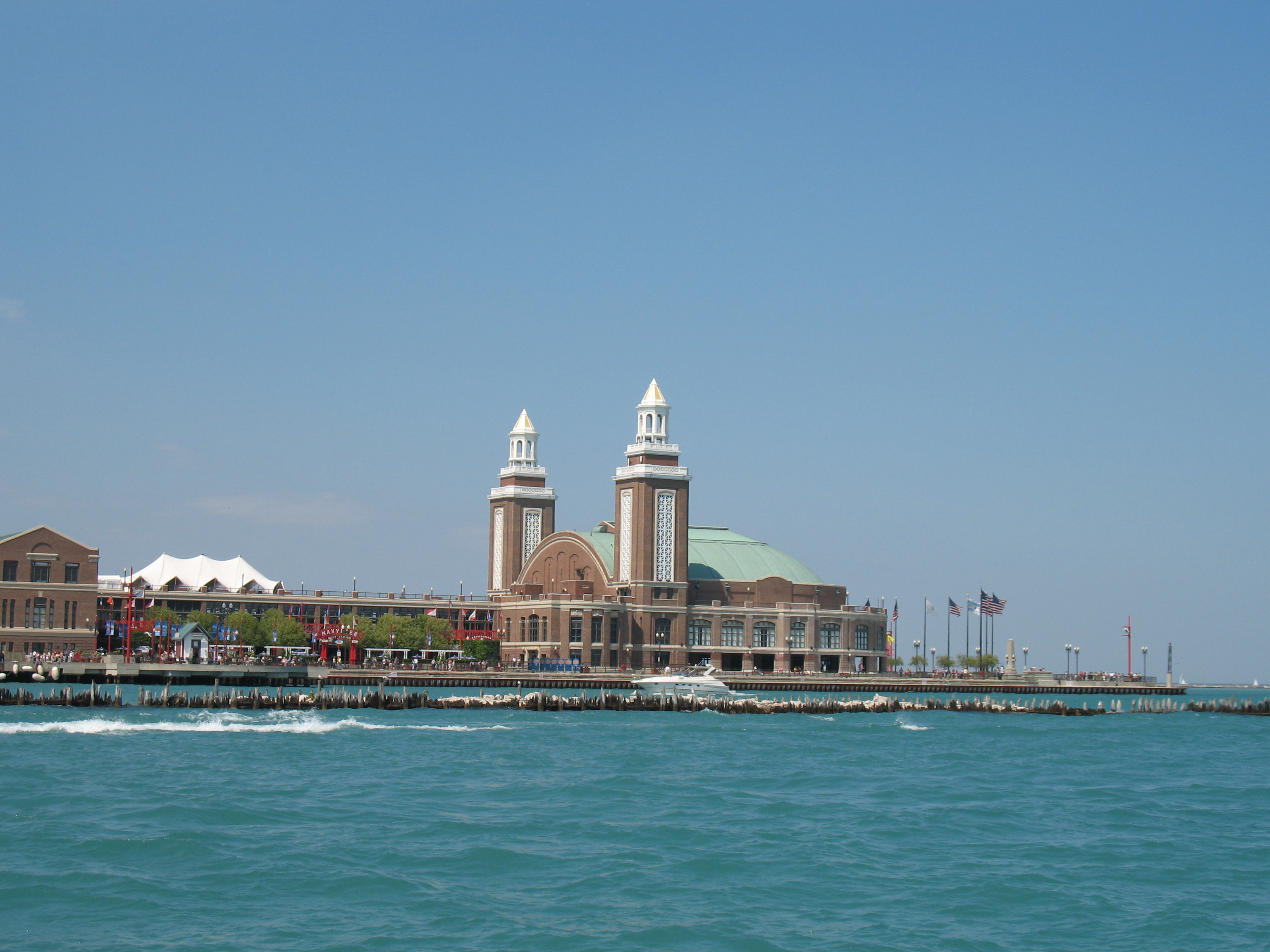
Navy Pier Auditorium

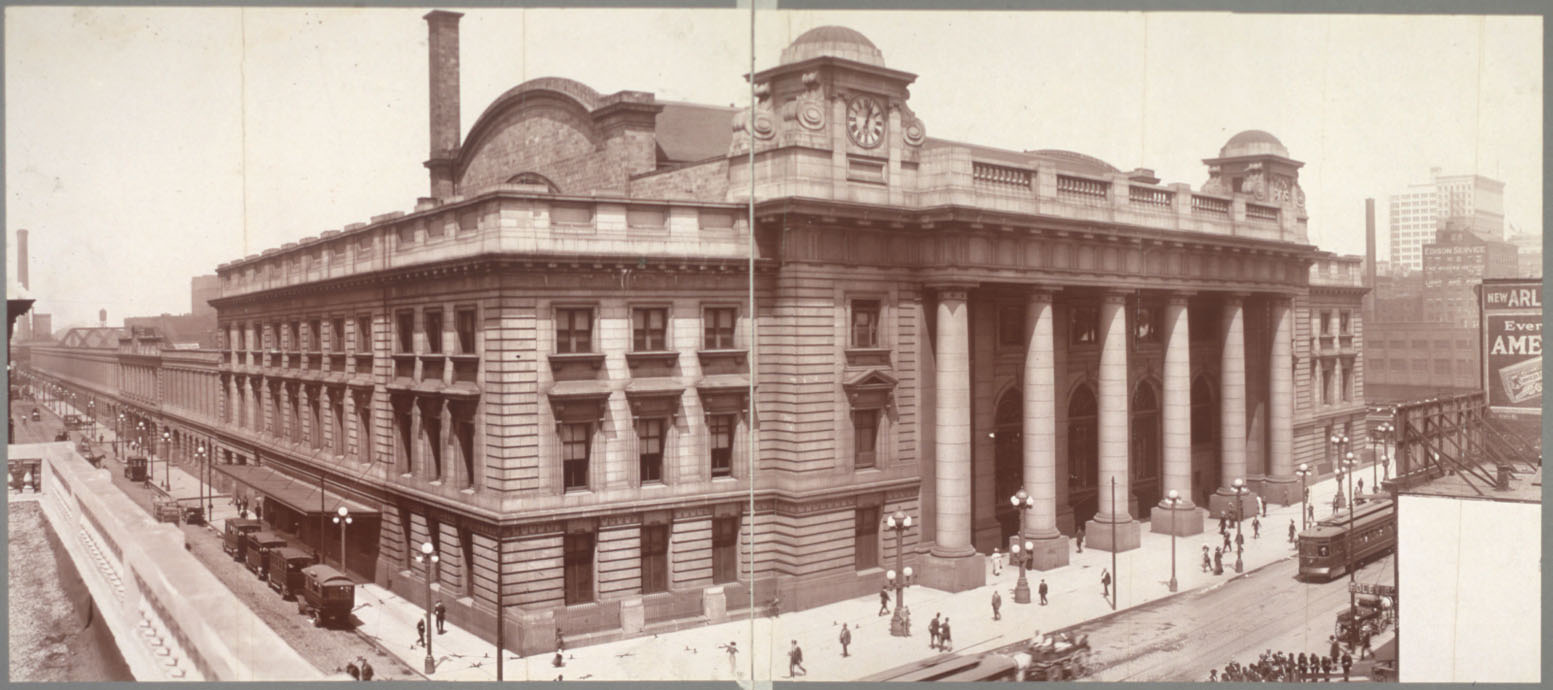
Old Chicago and North Western Terminal c. 1912, soon after its completion

- Union Depot, 201 South Main Street, Leavenworth, Kansas, 1888 (with Cobb)
- Chicago and North Western Railway Lake Front Depot, Wisconsin Avenue, Milwaukee, Wisconsin, 1889, demolished 1968
- Morgan Park Library (George C. Walker Branch Library) in Chicago, 1889-90
- Adams Memorial Library in Wheaton, Illinois, 1891
- The Second Union Station, Omaha, Nebraska, 1891
- Western Bank Note Building in Chicago in 1891
- Fond du Lac Chicago and Northwestern Railroad Depot, Fond du Lac, Wisconsin, 1891
- Chicago and North Western Railway station, 200 North 6th Street, De Kalb, Illinois, 1891 (with Granger)
- Chicago and North Western Railway station, 724 Green Bay Road, Glencoe, Illinois, 1891
- Chicago and North Western Railway depot, Broad Street, Lake Geneva, 1891
- Chicago and North Western Railway depot, Milwaukee Avenue, South Milwaukee, Wisconsin, 1893
- Maine State Building, 1893 for the World's Columbian Exposition

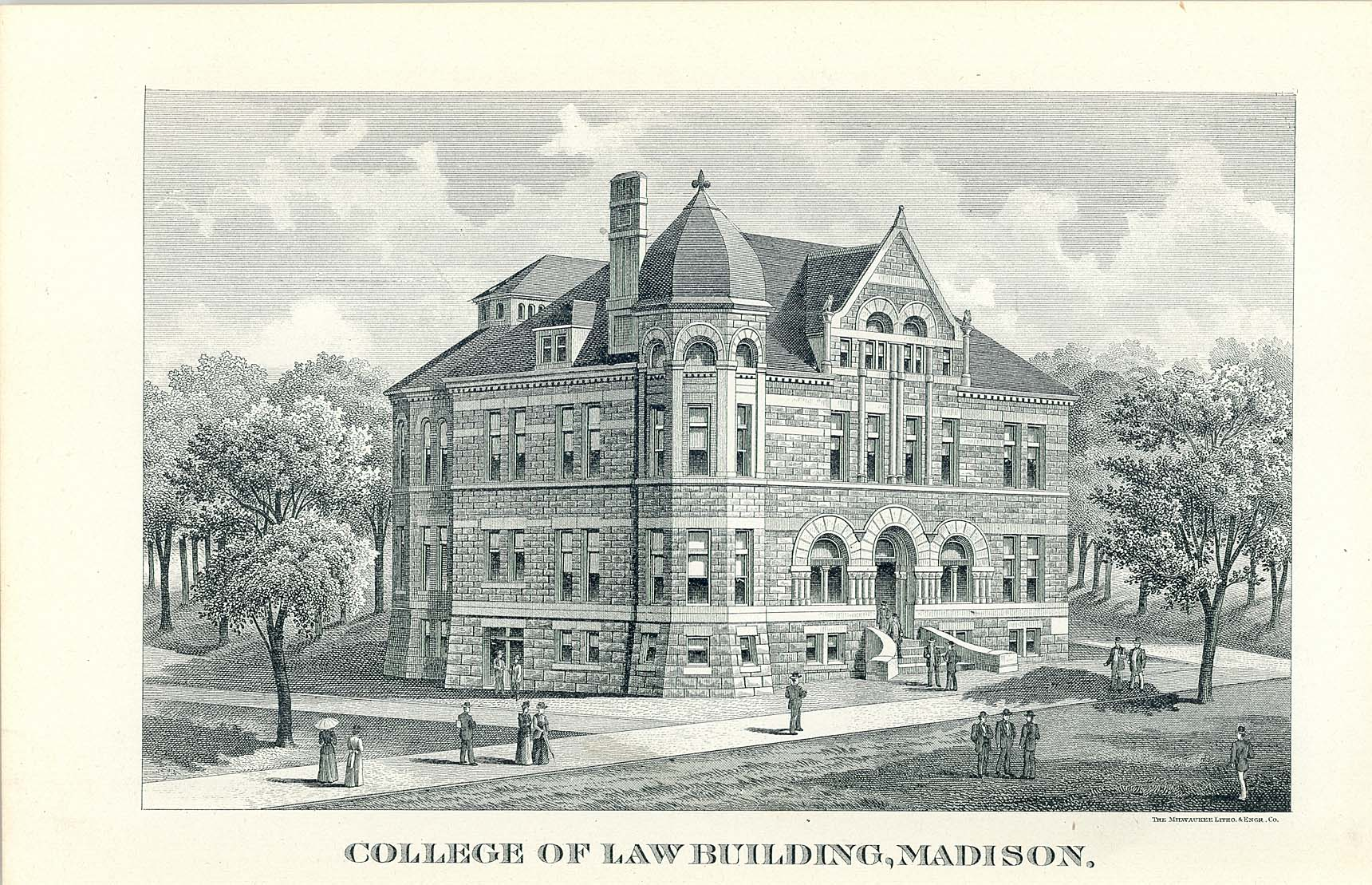
1893 engraving of the University of Wisconsin College of Law building

- Old Law Building, Madison, Wisconsin 1893
- Chicago and North Western Railway depot, Belle Plaine, Iowa 1894
- Richard T. Ely House in Madison, 1896
- Chicago and North Western Railway depot, North West and West 5th Streets, Carroll, Iowa, 1896
- Oconomowoc Milwaukee Road depot, 115 Collins Street, Oconomowoc, Wisconsin, 1896
- Milwaukee Road Passenger Depot in Green Bay, 1898 (Frost & Granger)
- Milwaukee Road Depot, 201 3rd Street South, Minneapolis, Minnesota, 1899
- Chicago and North Western Railway station, Western Avenue, Lake Forest, Illinois, 1899 (Frost & Granger)
- Chicago and North Western Railway depot, 200 Dousman Street, Green Bay, Wisconsin, 1899 (Frost & Granger)
- Union Depot, 417 Chapple Avenue, Ashland, Wisconsin, 1900
- Chicago and North Western Railway depot, 526 Main Street, Ames, Iowa, 1900
- Chicago, Milwaukee and St. Paul Railway Company Passenger Depot, 127 South Spring Street, Beaver Dam, Wisconsin, 1900 (Frost & Granger)
- Rock Island Lines Passenger Station, 5th Avenue at 31st Street, Rock Island, Illinois, 1901 (Frost & Granger)
- Chicago and North Western Railway depot, Racine, Wisconsin, 1901 (Frost & Granger)
- LaSalle Street Station, 1902 (Frost & Granger)
- Chicago and North Western Railway station, Oak Street Northwest, Sleepy Eye, Minnesota, 1902 (Frost & Granger)
- West Madison Depot, Chicago, Milwaukee, and St. Paul Railway, 640 West Washington Avenue, Madison, Wisconsin, 1903 (Frost & Granger)
- Chicago and Northwest Railroad Passenger Station, Watertown, Wisconsin, 1903
- Lake Bluff station, Lake Bluff, Illinois, 1904 (Frost & Granger)
- Chicago and North Western Depot, Railroad Street, Reedsburg, Wisconsin, 1905 (Frost & Granger)
- Chicago and North Western Railway station, Main Street, Breda, Iowa, 1907 (Frost & Granger)
- Norwood Park station, Norwood Park, Illinois, 1907 (Frost & Granger)
- Chicago and North Western Railway depot, Antigo, Wisconsin, 1907 (Frost & Granger)
- St. Luke's Hospital Complex in Chicago, 1908 (with Granger), 1439 S. Michigan/1440 S. Indiana
- Chicago and North Western Railway Power House, Chicago, 1909 (Frost & Granger)
- Chicago and North Western Terminal, 1911 (with Granger)
- Electric Railway Chambers, Winnipeg, Manitoba, 1912
- Minneapolis Great Northern Depot, 1913
- Chicago and North Western Railway station, Glen Ellyn, Illinois, 1914
- Navy Pier Auditorium in Chicago, 1916
- Railroad and Bank Building, 176 East 5th Street, St. Paul, Minnesota, 1916
- Chicago and North Western Railway Ore Dock Office, Ashland, Wisconsin, 1916
- Chicago and North Western Railway passenger station, Springfield, Minnesota, 1916
- Union Depot, St. Paul, Minnesota, 1917
- Chicago and North Western Railway depot, Eagle River, Wisconsin, 1923

== See also ==
- Architecture of Chicago
- Cobb and Frost
- Frost & Granger
- Lake Forest Library
- Lake Forest, Illinois
