= Oconomowoc station =

Oconomowoc
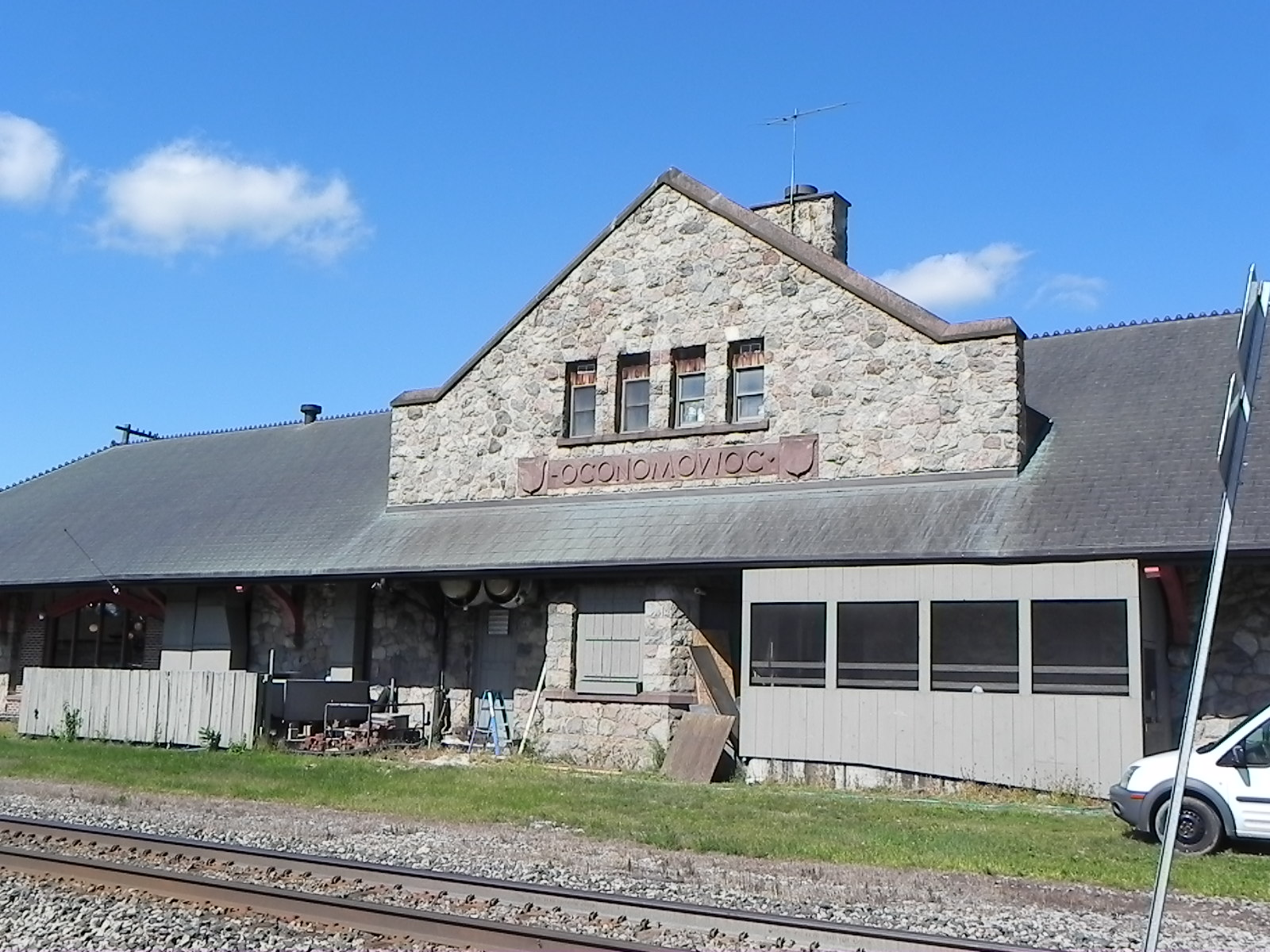
- The depot with "Oconomowoc" written in stone

General information
- Location: 115 East Collins Street, Oconomowoc, Wisconsin 53066
- System: Former Milwaukee Road passenger rail station

History
- Opened: 1896
- Closed: 1971

Services
Preceding station	Milwaukee Road	Following station
Ixonia toward Seattle or Tacoma	Main Line	Brookfield toward Chicago
Ixonia toward Madison	Madison – Milwaukee via Watertown	Okauchee toward Milwaukee
Ixonia toward Watertown	Suburban Service Watertown – Milwaukee	Gifford toward Milwaukee
- Milwaukee Road Depot
- U.S. National Register of Historic Places
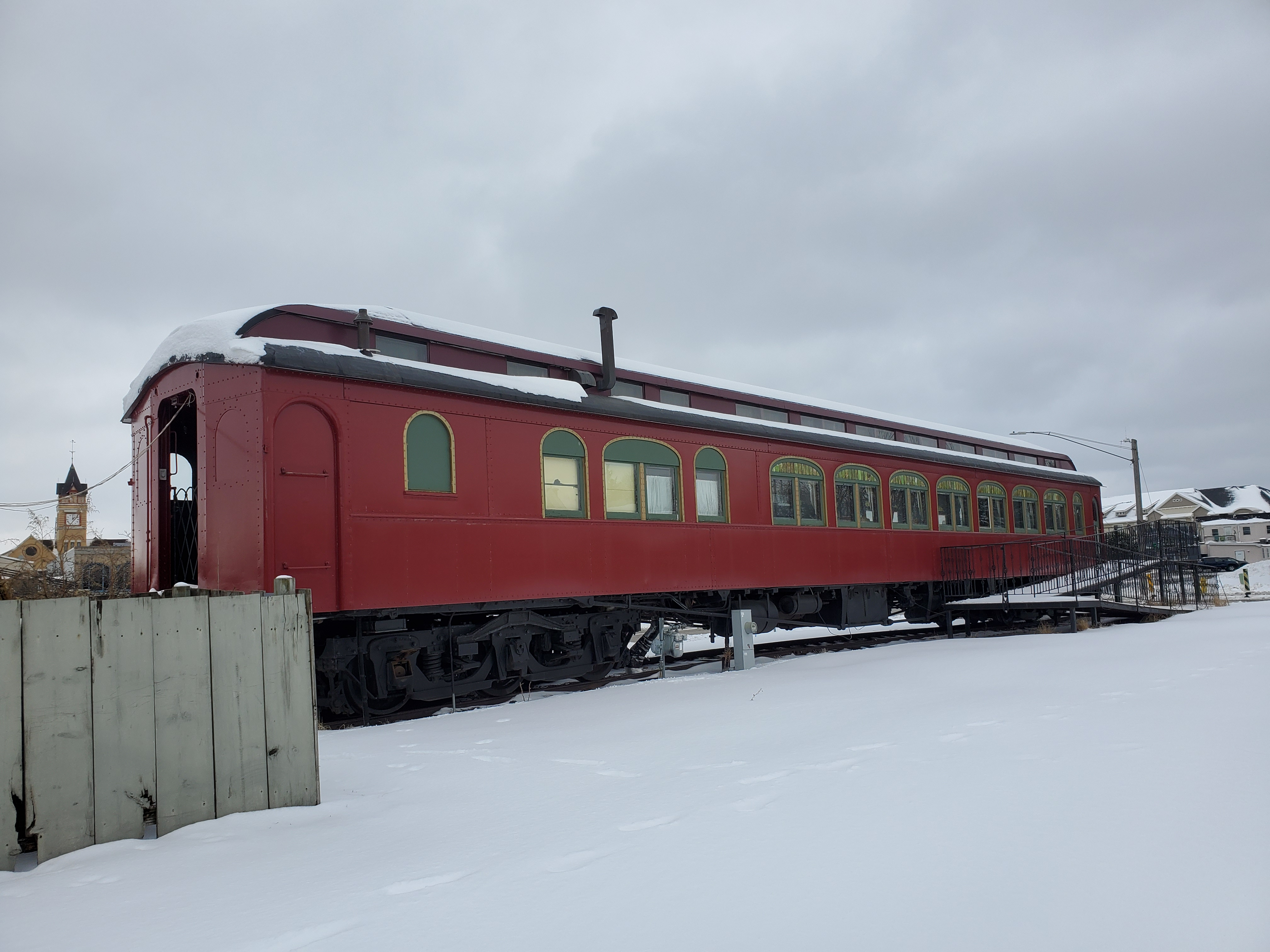
- The renovated Northern Pacific passenger car on display next to the depot.
- Location: 115 E Collins St, Oconomowoc, Wisconsin, United States
- Coordinates: 43°06′34″N 88°29′54″W
- Built: 1896
- Architect: Charles Sumner Frost
- Architectural style: Victorian
- NRHP reference No.: 80000206
- Added to NRHP: January 29, 1980
Location

The Milwaukee Road Depot in Oconomowoc, Wisconsin, United States, is a railroad depot built in 1896 and operated by the Chicago, Milwaukee, St. Paul and Pacific Railroad. It is a one-story hip-roofed building clad in split granite. The station served the Twin Cities Hiawatha from its formation in 1935 to its discontinuation in 1971, and now operates as Maxim's Restaurant. On display outside is a railway platform and Northern Pacific Railway 1923, a passenger car that operated on the Kettle Moraine Scenic Railway which was later renovated and painted red. The Canadian Pacific Railway's single-tracked Watertown Subdivision remains next to the depot.

The depot was listed on the National Register of Historic Places in 1980 and on the State Register of Historic Places in 1989.
