= Cannonball (Milwaukee Road train) =

Defunct Milwaukee commuter train

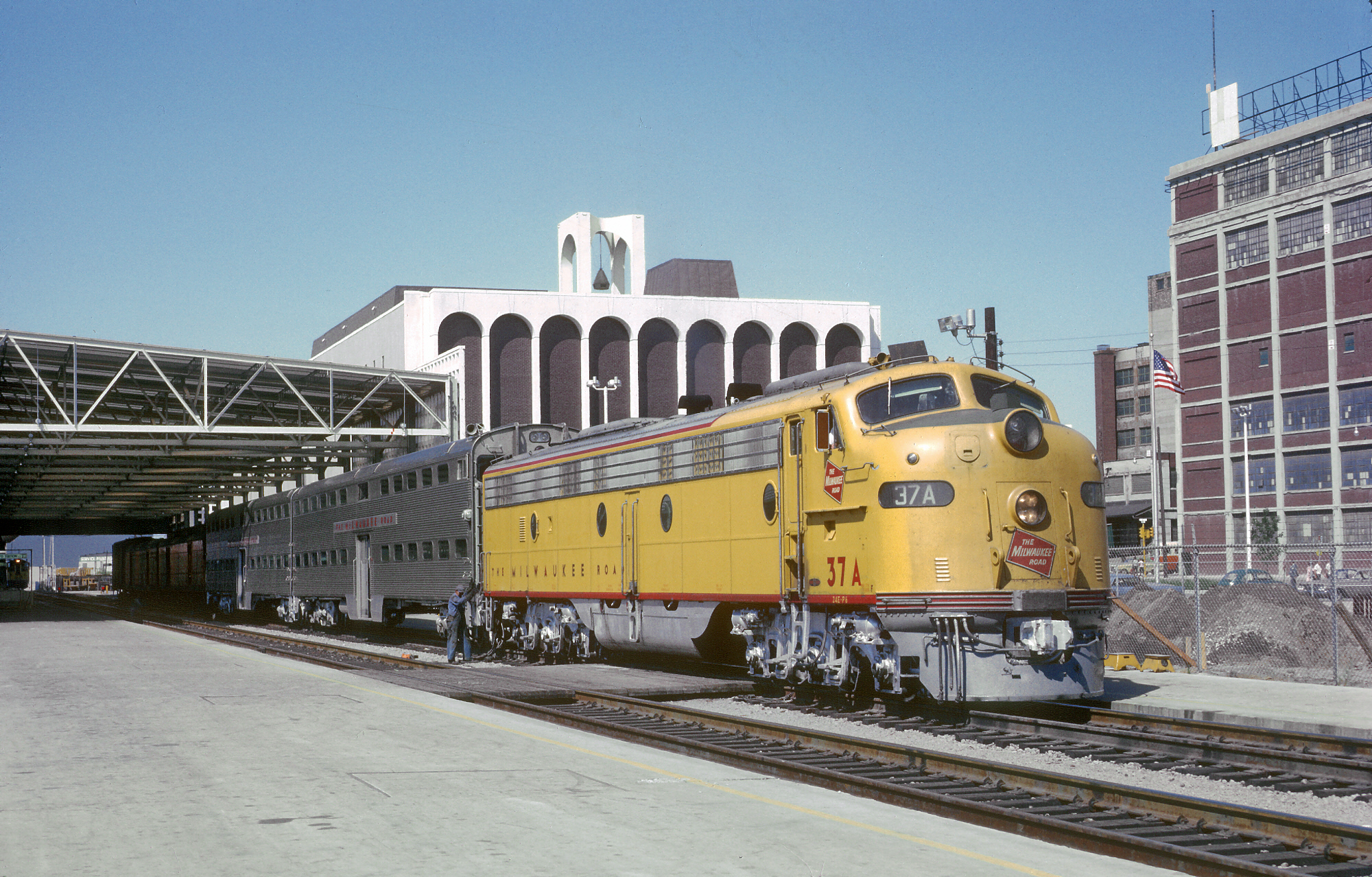
- MILW 37A (E9A) Train 12 for Chicago with bi-levels at depot in Milwaukee (1966)

Overview
- Service type: Commuter rail
- Status: Defunct
- Locale: Metro Milwaukee, U.S.
- First service: 1886
- Last service: July 31, 1972
- Former operator: Milwaukee Road

Route
- Termini: Milwaukee Union Station; Watertown Depot
- Stops: 15
- Distance travelled: 45.5 miles (73.2 km)
- Average journey time: 70 minutes
- Service frequency: One-daily roundtrip
- Train numbers: 12 (eastbound); 23 (westbound)
- Line used: Watertown Subdivision

Technical
- Rolling stock: EMD FP7 or EMD E9; Two streamlined coaches
- Track gauge: 1,435 mm (4 ft 8 1/2 in)
- Operating speed: 70 mph (110 km/h) (top); 39 mph (63 km/h) (average)

The Cannonball was a commuter rail train operated by the Milwaukee Road from Watertown to Milwaukee, Wisconsin, United States, until 1972. It was the last commuter train to serve Milwaukee. Cannonball was a colloquial nickname for the train, which operated as Train No. 12 inbound in the morning and No. 23 outbound in the evening.

== History ==
The Milwaukee Road main line was completed between Milwaukee and Watertown in 1855. The train's heritage dates to 1886, originating as a Madison–Milwaukee–Chicago intercity service. The corridor has had several of these trains throughout its history, but train 12 left Watertown at daybreak and arrived in Milwaukee before business hours. Its counterpart, train 23, left Milwaukee just after office close and arrived back at Watertown by early evening. Passengers would have a layover at Milwaukee between runs to or from Chicago, where head-end cars would be switched onto the train. (Note: Chicago through service, sharing numbers and equipment with Watertown–Milwaukee runs, was treated as a separate train as their two operating districts divided at Milwaukee.) Amtrak would continue the Milwaukee–Chicago through practice, ultimately extending to St. Louis, until July 10, 1972, a few weeks before the commuter train's discontinuance. On February 18, 1957, direct service to Madison was truncated at Watertown, firmly establishing the train's dedicated commuter status.

By the 1940s, passengers began calling the commuter train the Cannonball, a nickname the Milwaukee Road rarely acknowledged. In 1958 the railroad petitioned to discontinue service, citing the service net a loss of $37,931 (equivalent to $315,000 in 2024) the previous year and operating costs were $1.32 per mile (equivalent to $10.98 per mile in 2024). Service at this time was one daily roundtrip, inbound to Milwaukee in the morning and outbound in the evening, excluding Sundays and holidays. In a public hearing on discontinuation held in Milwaukee, commuters represented by attorney David E. Beckwith successfully argued there were more people riding the trains than the railroad claimed and that replacement bus service would not be a viable alternative for communities. In 1959, it was proposed that service on Saturdays and holidays could be dropped. At some point thereafter, it transitioned to a Monday-Friday service schedule.

The Cannonball attracted regular riders over the course of its run, like Evelyn Thomsen, who took the train's first seat each night and earned the nickname of the train's "first lady". William Clark, the train's conductor for over five years, said the commuters were "like a family". The train hosted parties during the Friday night trip outbound from Milwaukee; a band would play music, and the train often held at intermediate stops to resupply beer and ice for the festivities.

In 1965 the Milwaukee Road moved all trains to their new downtown Milwaukee station, and abandoned Everett Street Depot. In 1969 there were five trains, including the Cannonball, providing service throughout the day in the Milwaukee–Watertown corridor. That year the service cost the railroad $67,000 to operate, jumping to $76,000 in 1970. When Amtrak took over intercity trains on May 1, 1971, they retained no shared stops with the Milwaukee Road's commuter service; the next station west of Milwaukee was Columbus, 65 miles from Union Station. In its dying days the train was averaging only 50 to 60 passengers a day. The final day of service was July 31, 1972.

== Equipment ==
The Cannonball typically operated with only two streamlined coaches hauled by an EMD FP7 or EMD E9 based out of Watertown. Usual coaches were 1942 Hiawatha cars retired into commuter service. All equipment was painted Armour Yellow with red lettering, the Milwaukee Road's standard passenger scheme since 1955. On the final day the train hauled an extra coach to accommodate the additional riders who came out to say their last goodbyes.

Before the 1920s, a private railcar was a regular part of the consist, chartered by executives to reach their lake homes the Milwaukee Road passed in Okauchee and Oconomowoc. The through run to Chicago allowed the train to be serviced at the railroad's Western Avenue Coach Yard, which served long-distance trains and Chicago area commuter trains, and is now a Metra facility. During the brief period when the equipment was split between the Milwaukee Road and Amtrak, foreign power and coaches sometimes crept into the commuter service from Amtrak's Chicago pool. (Note: During Amtrak's early years their equipment was generally pooled from the route's ex-operating railroad and often still serviced at their facilities. Amtrak's Chicago–Milwaukee trains continued to be serviced at the Milwaukee Road's Western Avenue Coach Yard, but when Amtrak extended the Abraham Lincoln to Milwaukee on the Cannonball's through service schedule, the fleet pool included ex-Gulf, Mobile & Ohio rolling stock.)

== Legacy ==
After its discontinuance, passengers appealed to court to try to get the Cannonball reinstated. Periodic attempts to reintroduce commuter rail to Watertown have been met with unsupportive state funding. In October 1980 a Budd SPV-2000 demonstrated commuter service for a five-day trial. Despite the railcar breaking down on the first trip, reception was modest with ticket sales covering half the cost and some trips having standee passengers. A brief revival occurred once again in the form of a 90-day pilot program to provide alternative transportation during repaving of Interstate 94 from April 14 to July 11, 1998. The service extended four roundtrips of Amtrak's Hiawatha to Watertown station, with intermediate stops in Oconomowoc, Pewaukee, Elm Grove, Brookfield, and Wauwatosa before Milwaukee and continuing to Chicago. The pilot saw 32,446 riders use the service, with 89% saying they would continue commuting on the train if it remained available. Canadian Pacific, successor to the Milwaukee Road and reluctant host of the commuter pilot, refused to allow the service to continue, claiming upcoming track work.

Future Amtrak service to Madison is planned by extending Amtrak Hiawatha trains from Milwaukee, with the new route expected to reintroduce stations at Watertown and Oconomowoc.

== See also ==
- Milwaukee District North Line and Milwaukee District West Line – Milwaukee Road's suburban division in Chicago
- North Shore Line – electric interurban from Milwaukee to Chicago
- Speedrail (TMER&L) – Milwaukee rapid transit system, extended to Watertown
- Union Pacific North Line – last suburban train in Wisconsin
