= Chicago Opera House =

Theater building in Chicago, Illinois, US

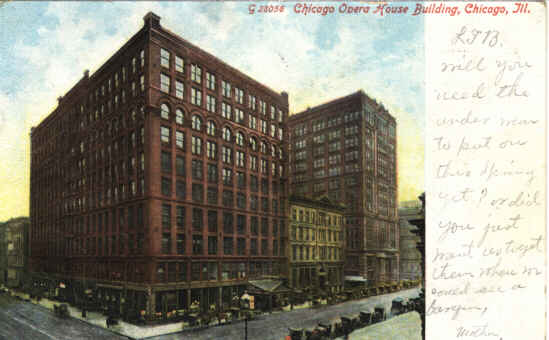
- The Chicago Opera House ca. 1885-95

General information
- Type: Offices and Theater
- Location: Chicago, USA
- Coordinates: 41.8830°N 87.6313°W
- Completed: 1885
- Destroyed: 1913

Design and construction
- Architect: Cobb and Frost

The Chicago Opera House was a theater complex in Chicago, Illinois, designed by the architectural firm of Cobb and Frost. The Chicago Opera House building took the cue provided by the Metropolitan Opera of New York as a mixed-used building: it housed both a theater and unrelated offices, used to subsidize the cost of the theater building. The theater itself was located in the middle of the complex and office structures flanked each side. The entire complex was known as the "Chicago Opera House Block," and was located at the Southwest corner of West Washington Avenue and North Clark Street.

The Chicago Opera House opened to the public on August 18, 1885. The first performance in the new theater was of Hamlet starring Thomas W. Keene. From 1887 to 1890, the Chicago Opera House served as the official observation location for recording the climate of the city of Chicago by the National Weather Service.

The theater suffered a fire in December 1888, which mainly damaged portions of the roof. However, the roof was repaired, and most of the exterior of the building remained undamaged. During its existence, the Chicago Opera House premiered several successful musicals such as Sinbad and The Arabian Nights.

The last performance at the building was the stage play The Escape by Paul Armstrong (made into a 1914 silent film, later lost, by D.W. Griffith). Demolition of The Chicago Opera House began May 5, 1913. The site became occupied by the Burnham Center (formerly known as the Conway Building), completed in 1915.

== Construction ==
The idea for the Chicago Opera House came from Scottish-born newspaperman and financier David Henderson. Henderson "planned the scheme and the stock – 550,000 – was subscribed in six weeks. Thus Chicago had the first fireproof, steel constructed, electric lighted theatre in the country." The construction of the Chicago Opera House was one of the earliest examples of general contracting, run by George A. Fuller. Upon completion, the masonry-clad building was 10 stories and 140 feet (43 m) tall.
