= Kate Shelley 400 =

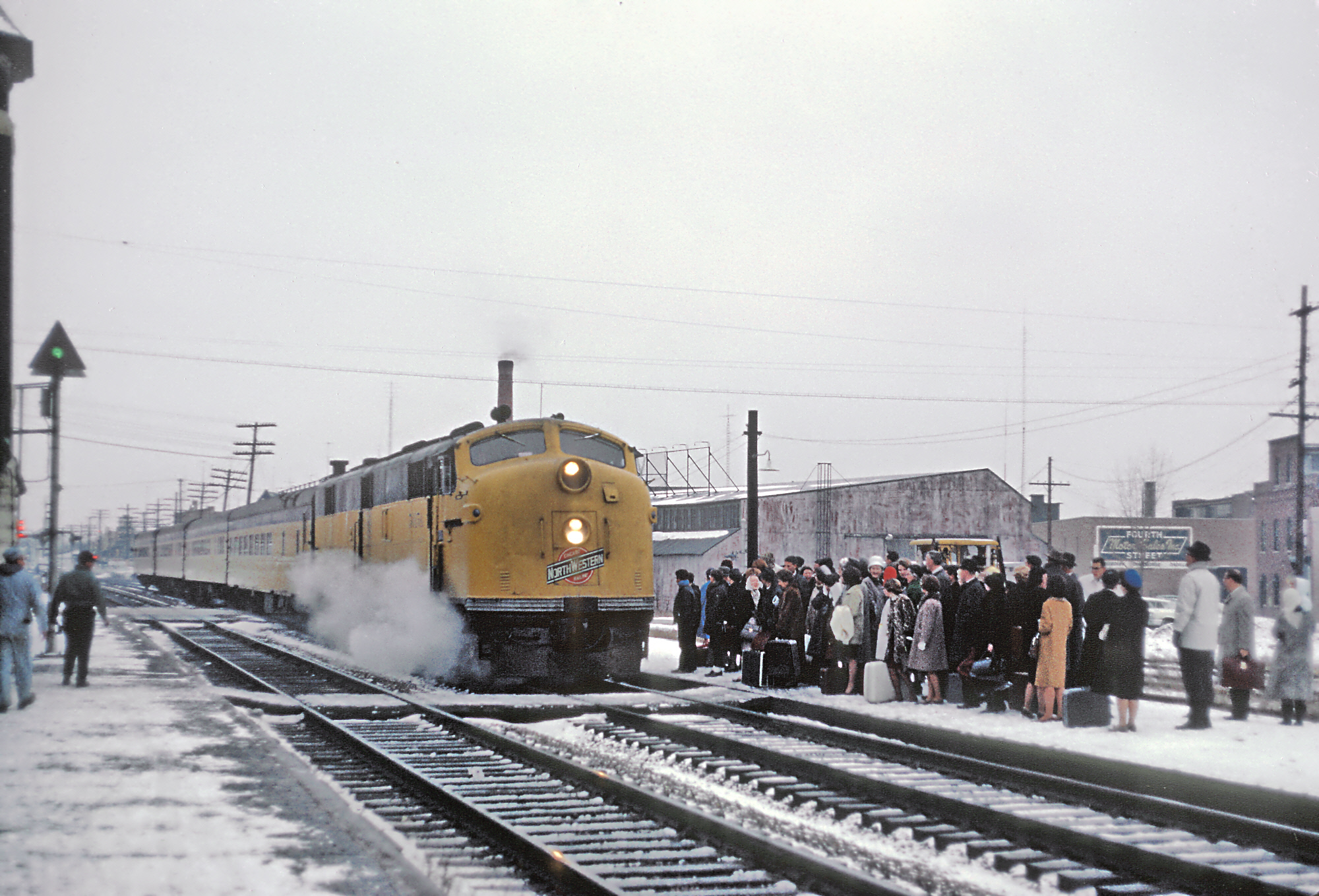
- The Kate Shelley 400 at DeKalb station in December 1964

Overview
- Status: Discontinued
- Locale: Illinois and Iowa
- First service: October 1955
- Last service: July 23, 1963
- Former operator: Chicago and North Western Railway

Route
- Termini: North Western Terminal, Chicago, Illinois: Boone, Iowa (1955–56); Cedar Rapids, Iowa (1956–57); Clinton, Iowa (1957–63)
- Service frequency: Daily
- Train numbers: Except Sundays: 1, 2; Sundays: 11, 12

Technical
- Track gauge: 4 ft 8 1/2 in (1,435 mm) standard gauge

The Kate Shelley 400 was a short-lived streamlined passenger train operated by the Chicago and North Western Railway between Chicago, Illinois and Iowa. The train drew its name from the CNW's popular Twin Cities 400, named for its 400-mile (644 km) run from Chicago to Minneapolis, Minnesota in 400 minutes, and Kate Shelley, a young woman who in 1881 risked her life to save a passenger train from a washed-out bridge.

The C&NW introduced the Kate Shelley to fill replace the Union Pacific Railroad's famed "City" streamliners, which had moved from the CNW's route to that of the Milwaukee Road. The Kate Shelley made its first run in October 1955. Initially it operated to Boone, Iowa, but this was cut back in 1956 to Cedar Rapids, Iowa, and then again in 1957 to Clinton, Iowa, just across the Mississippi River. The CNW dropped the name altogether on July 23, 1963, though the unnamed trains #1 and #2 continued running until the formation of Amtrak in 1971, when they were discontinued.
