= DeKalb station =

DeKalb
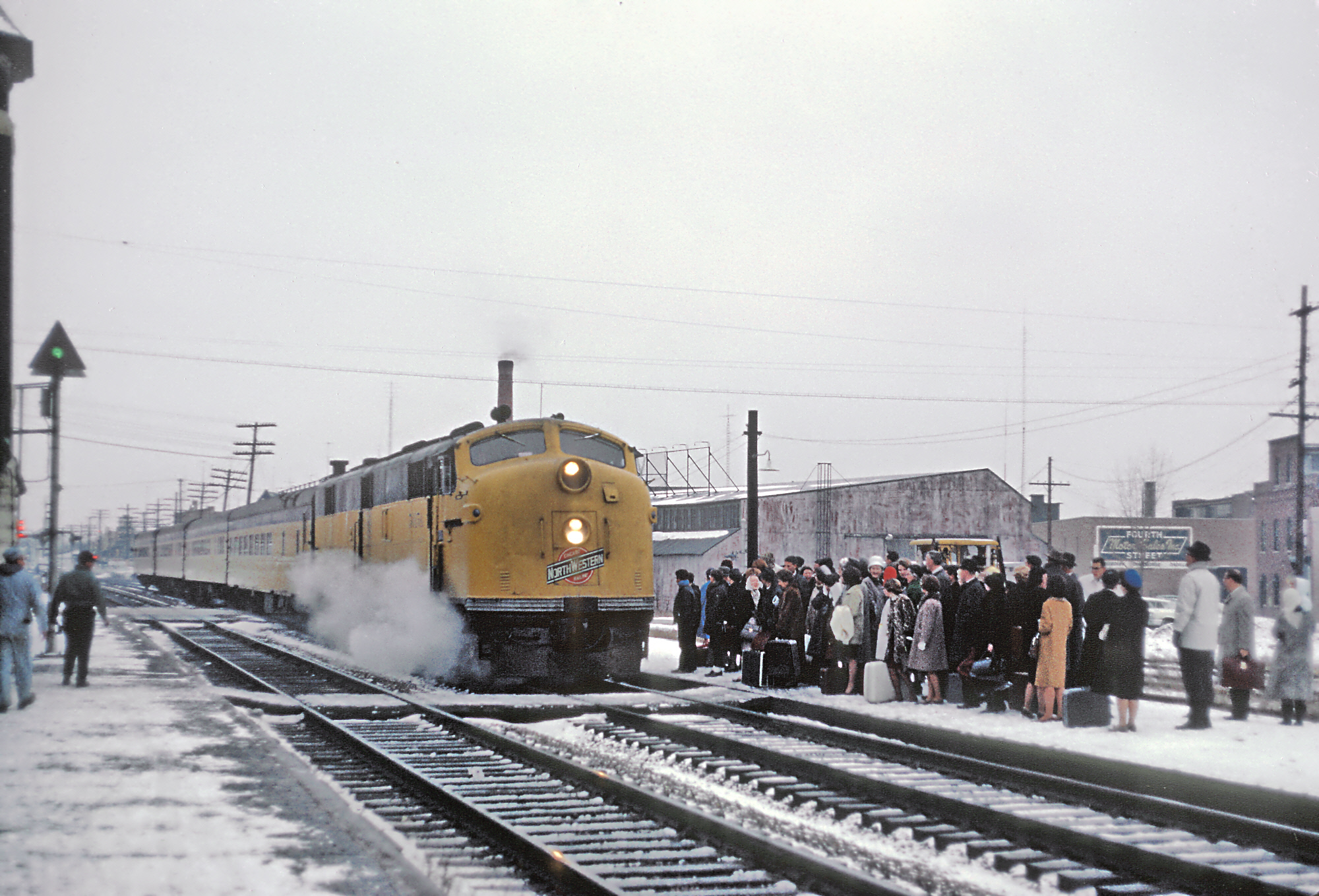
- The eastbound Kate Shelley 400 arriving at DeKalb in December 1964

General information
- Location: 200 N Sixth Street; DeKalb, Illinois
- Coordinates: 41.929203°N 88.746323°W
- System: Chicago and North Western Railway station
- Owner: Union Pacific Railroad
- Platforms: 1 side platform, 1 island platform (removed)
- Tracks: 5 (2 remain)

Construction
- Structure type: At-grade

History
- Opened: 1853
- Closed: 1971
- Rebuilt: 1891

Services
Preceding station	Chicago and North Western Railway	Following station
Malta toward Omaha	Main Line	Cortland toward Chicago
Sycamore toward Belvidere	Belvidere – Spring Valley	Elva toward Spring Valley
Location

DeKalb station is a former railway station in Downtown DeKalb, Illinois. It served passenger trains of the Chicago and North Western Railway (C&NW) along its main line between Chicago and Omaha. The station was designed by Charles Sumner Frost and Alfred Hoyt Granger in 1891 and closed for passenger service in 1971. The building still stands and is used by the Union Pacific Railroad for offices.

== Description ==
The station is built in a rectangular design, on the south side of the tracks. It was designed in a Richardsonian Romanesque style by Charles Sumner Frost and Alfred Hoyt Granger. The building is made from brick and stone, and features a tower facing the tracks. A freight depot once existed across the tracks from the passenger station. The area featured five tracks, and has since been reduced to two. A near identical twin of the station was built in Fond du Lac, Wisconsin.

== History ==
The Galena and Chicago Union Railroad first entered DeKalb on August 22, 1853. DeKalb was initially the western terminus of the "Dixon Air Line" branch. The railroad was eventually extended to the Mississippi River at Fulton, Illinois, in December 1855. A bridge was constructed over the Mississippi and the railroad was bought by the Chicago and North Western Railway in 1864. The line was eventually extended to Council Bluffs and Omaha. A north–south line was completed by the Northern Illinois Railway, extending from Belvidere to Spring Valley. This was bought by the C&NW on June 9, 1888, although passenger service only lasted until the 1920s.

The first station in DeKalb, built by the Galena and Chicago Union Railroad, was on 3rd Street. All that remains in this location is a historical marker placed in 1953 to honor the centennial of the railroad arriving in DeKalb. The location of the station was eventually moved to the current location, between 6th and 7th Streets. A joint passenger/freight depot was used until the construction of the present depot.

The current station was opened in 1891, after double tracking of the line. It served Chicago and North Western trains, as well as jointly operated trains that operated via Union Pacific Railroad's Overland Route west of Omaha. These trains included the San Francisco Challenger, Pacific Limited, and the Los Angeles Limited. First-class streamliner trains such as the City of Denver, City of Los Angeles, and City of Portland did not stop at DeKalb. Union Pacific trains were shifted from the C&NW to the Milwaukee Road in 1955, and the Kate Shelley 400 and The Omahan served DeKalb. The Kate Shelley 400 initially ran to Boone, Iowa, before it was shortened to Cedar Rapids and finally Clinton, Iowa. The name was eventually dropped, and the unnamed #1 and #2 trains were the final trains to stop at DeKalb on April 30, 1971. C&NW passenger service ended and Amtrak took over intercity rail in the United States.

The C&NW was eventually bought by the Union Pacific Railroad in 1995, and DeKalb station has remained in use as an office. Metra's commuter rail service on the Union Pacific West Line was extended to Elburn, Illinois in 2006, 15 miles (24 km) east of DeKalb. An extension to DeKalb was listed in the "2040 Long-Range Transportation Plan" in Chicago. However, an extension of the line would require DeKalb County to join the Regional Transportation Authority (RTA), the operator of Metra. Northern Illinois University provides a shuttle from DeKalb to Elburn station, and stops adjacent to DeKalb station at Locust and 6th Street.
