= Edson Keith Estate =

Historic house in Florida, United States

- U.S. National Register of Historic Places
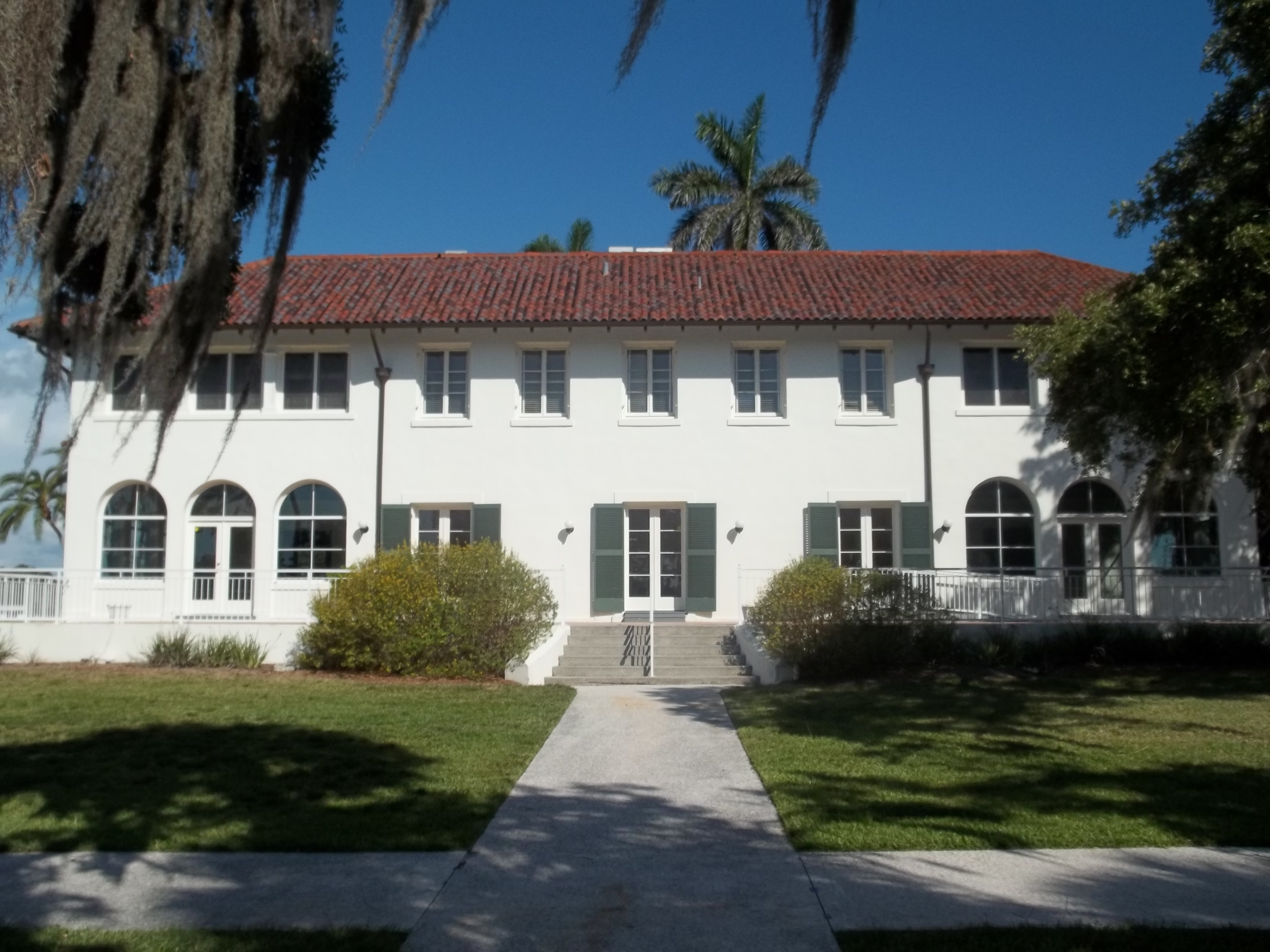

- Location within Florida Location within the United States
- Location: Sarasota, Florida
- Coordinates: 27°16′13″N 82°31′58″W
- NRHP reference No.: 91000282
- Added to NRHP: March 14, 1991

The Edson Keith Estate (also known as the Phillippi Estate Park or Phillippi Plantation) is a historic site in Sarasota, Florida. It is located at 5500 South Tamiami Trail. The home's construction was finalized in 1916. On March 14, 1991, it was added to the U.S. National Register of Historic Places.

== History ==
=== Precursors ===
In 1883, William Joel Drumright bought 40 acres along Phillippi Creek from the Florida Land and Improvement Company owned by Hamilton Disston for $50. Eight years later he received an additional 78 acres through homesteading them. He served on Manatee County's Democratic Executive Committee at the turn of the 20th century. In 1904 he was the Socialist Party's candidate for Clerk of the Circuit Court. In 1910 Drumright sold his land to George H. and C. Woodburn Matheny who platted the Phillippi Park development in 1911.

=== Estate ===
Edison Keith Jr. bought 8 subdivision lots in the Phillippi Park subdivision in 1915 for $7,000. Residence construction began during the summer of 1916. Original buildings remaining from the estate are the original home, the servants’ home, a garden shed and a garage. Previously the property included a water tower, the chauffeur’s home, and a variety of farm-related sheds. Keith died in 1939; his wife sold the property to Mae Hansen Prodie, a doll clothing designer from Chicago. Prodie's husband operated the estate as a luxury inn during the 1950s. Produce retired in the 1960s and resided in the home. When she died in 1986, Sarasota County purchased the land for a park, using monies raised through a bond referendum.

== Gallery ==
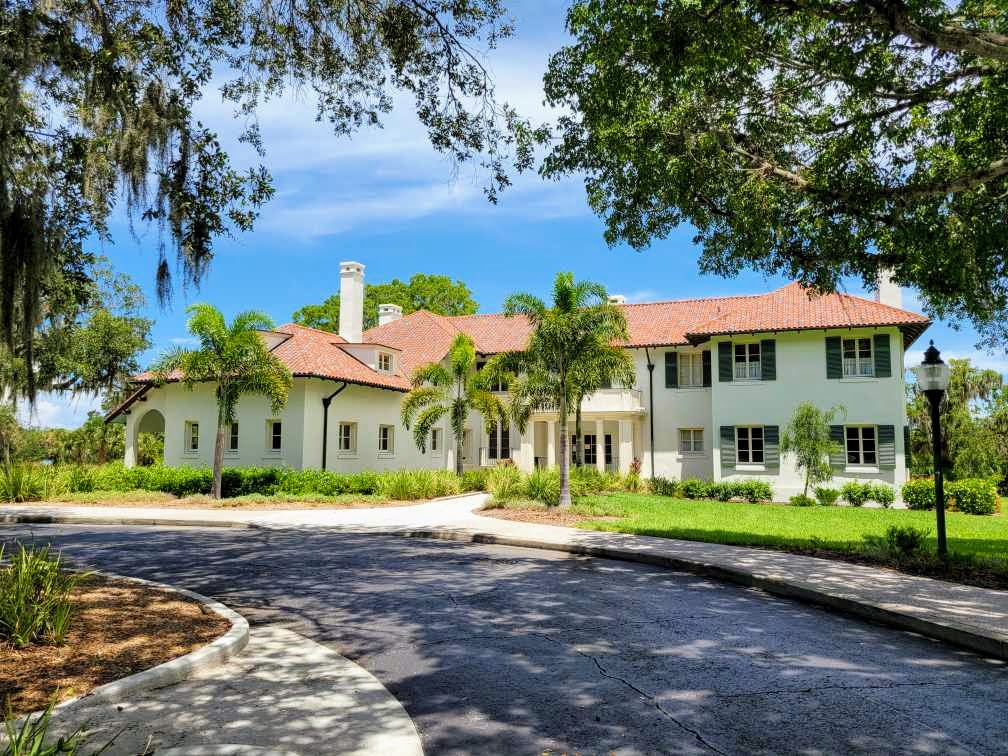
Front of Estate

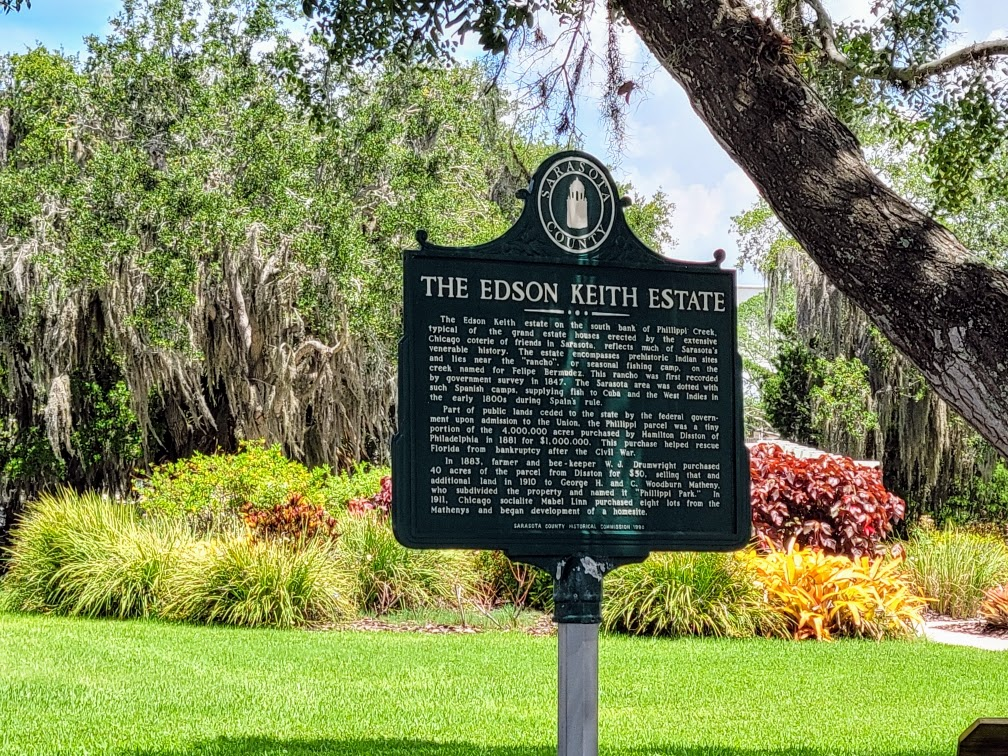
Historic Marker

== See also ==
- Harriet F. Rees House, also owned by the Keiths

== References and external links ==
- Sarasota County listings at National Register of Historic Places
- Sarasota County listings at Florida's Office of Cultural and Historical Programs
- Uzi Baram 2017 The Many Histories by Phillippi Creek https://www.ncf.edu/wp-content/uploads/2021/09/NCPAL-Report-4-Many-Histories-Phillippi-Creek.pdf
