= Cobb and Frost =

American architectural firm

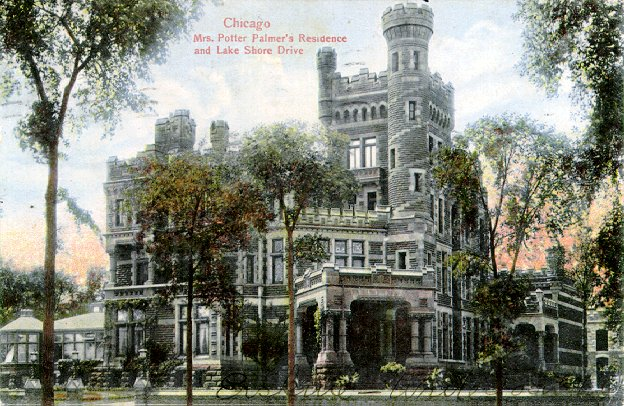
The Palmer Mansion

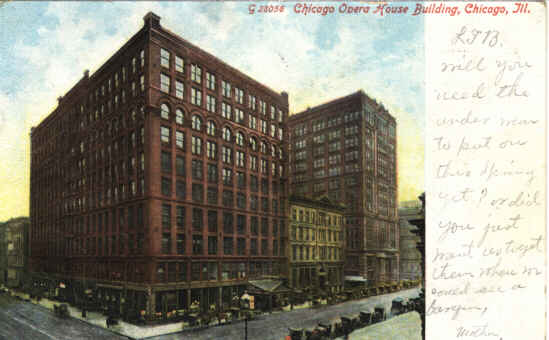
The Chicago Opera House

Cobb and Frost was an American architectural firm. Cobb and Frost was founded in Chicago, Illinois by Henry Ives Cobb and Charles Sumner Frost in 1882. The firm was dissolved in 1889 when Cobb began work on designing the Newberry Library. Their most famous building was the Palmer Mansion, designed for Chicago industrialist Potter Palmer.

== Selected buildings ==
- Palmer Mansion, 1882
- Chicago & North Western Railway Station, Oshkosh, Wisconsin, 1884
- Chicago Opera House, 1884-5
- Chicago & Alton Railway Station, Dwight, Illinois, 1885
- Cable House, 1886
- Chicago & North Western Railway Station, Kenosha, Wisconsin, 1887
- Harriet F. Rees House, 1888
- Dearborn Observatory, 1888
- Union Depot, 201 South Main Street, Leavenworth, Kansas, 1888
- Chicago & North Western Railway Station, Wheaton, Illinois
