= Harriet F. Rees House =

Historic house in Illinois, United States

- U.S. National Register of Historic Places
- Chicago Landmark
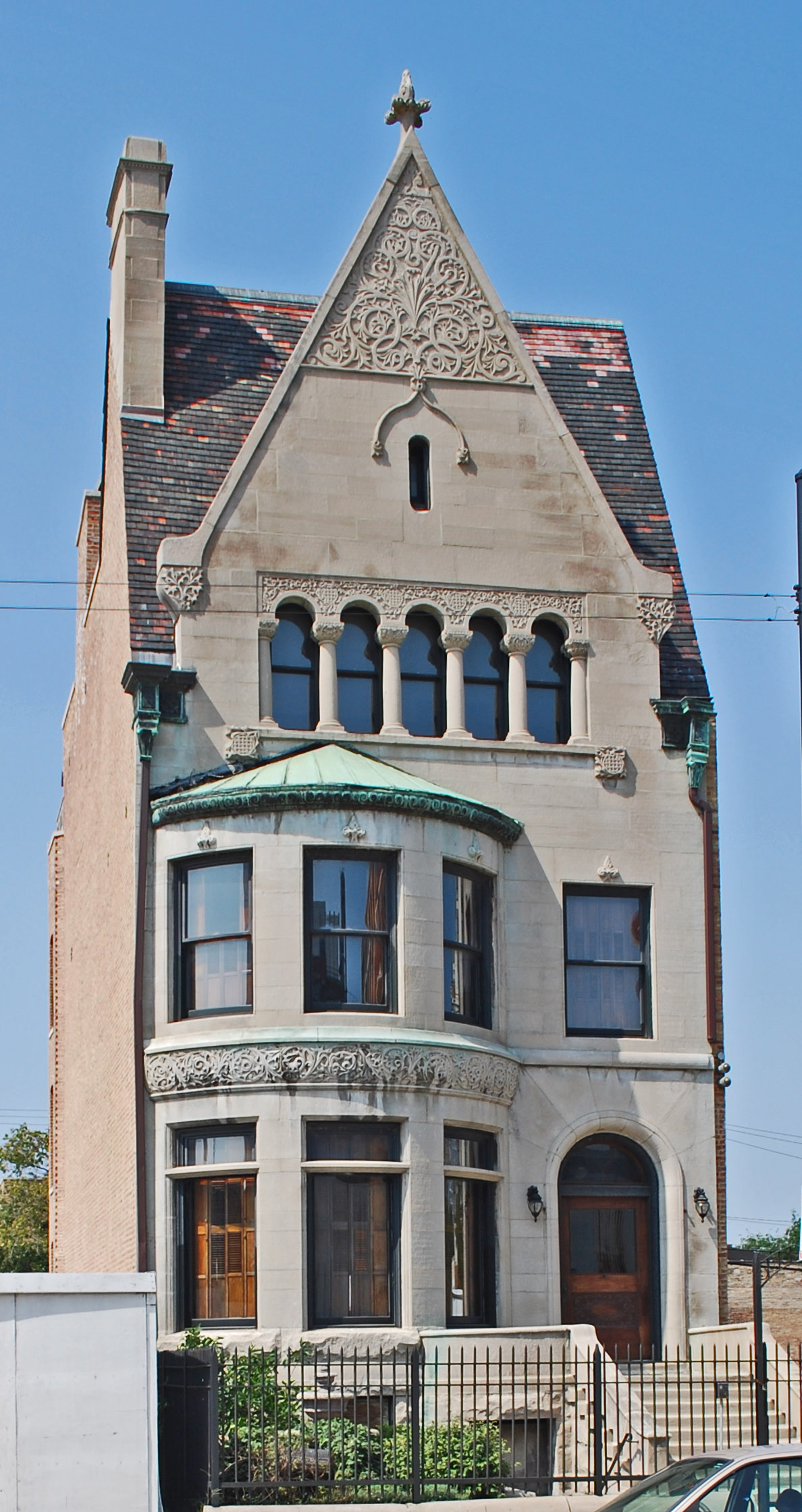
- Harriet F Rees House, Chicago IL

- Location within Chicago
- Location: 2017 S. Prairie Ave., Chicago, Illinois
- Coordinates: 41°51′14″N 87°37′15″W
- Area: 0.1 acres (0.040 ha)
- Built: 1888
- Architect: Cobb and Frost
- Architectural style: Romanesque Revival
- NRHP reference No.: 07000458

Significant dates
- Added to NRHP: May 22, 2007
- Designated CHICL: March 14, 2012

The Harriet F. Rees House (1888) is a historic residence in Chicago, Illinois, United States. Located on the historically important South Prairie Avenue, the Rees house was built for the widow of a real estate developer. In 2014, the house and its coach house were moved a block north in the Prairie Avenue District to make way for expanded entertainment facilities near McCormick Place.

== History ==
Residential development on the Near South Side of Chicago began in the 1850s in response to newly constructed rail lines. Prairie Avenue became one of the most desirable areas to live in the city, hosting millionaires such as Marshall Field and George Pullman. Harriet Frances (Butler) Rees, a native of Connecticut, was the widow of real estate developer James H. Rees.

James H. Rees became the city surveyor in 1836, then worked as a clerk and draftsman for former Mayor of Chicago William B. Ogden starting in 1839. He married Harriet F. Butler on June 4, 1844. Rees started his own real estate business with law clerk Edward R. Rucker in 1847. The firm was particularly noted for their introduction of abstracts of title. In 1852, Rees partnered with Samuel B. Chase to purchase 225 acres (91 ha) of Lake View Township, just north of the city. Rees left the abstract business later that year to focus on real estate.

The Reeses had one daughter, Carrie. They were charitable, donating to the Women's Hospital of the State of Illinois. James H. Rees died at their home on Wabash Avenue on September 20, 1880, from complications of diabetes. Harriet Rees decided to remain in Chicago. In 1888, then aged 71, Rees purchased one of the last open lots on Prairie Avenue for $15,000. Rees commissioned Cobb and Frost, one of the leading residential architecture firms in the city, to design a house. The house cost $20,000. Rees died there on December 10, 1892.

After the death of Rees, the house was sold to Edson Keith, Jr., for $42,500. Keith was an engineer for his father's company, Edson Keith & Co., eventually rising to become vice president. Keith was also an accomplished composer. Daughter Katherine married architect David Adler. The Keiths sold the house to typesetter Rolla W. McClure, who had been renting it since the 1910s, on March 1, 1923. McClure then converted the residence to a boarding house. The building passed through two other owners before it was purchased and opened as the Prairie House Café in 1970. It was sold to the Fung family in 1975, then purchased by the Martorinas in 2001. It is one of only eight surviving Prairie Avenue houses.

== Architecture ==
The three-story house was originally constructed between two other buildings; thus, it only has significant architectural details on its 25-foot (7.6 m) front (eastern) elevation. Likewise, all elevations are brick except for the ashlar limestone front facade. To the front, the roof is steeply pitched in a cross formation, is capped with a stone finial, and features a decorative panel in its triangular gable. The rear of the house has a flat roof. The facade features a two-story, bowed front bay topped by an ornamental copper roof. All windows are double-hung sash with wooden frames. The five small windows on the third floor are arched and the first floor windows feature transoms. The front stairs are also limestone and lead to a wooden door.

The Rees is one of the three remaining Romanesque Revival buildings on Chicago's Near South Side. The style was considered pricey at the time and mostly saw use in public buildings such as Adler & Sullivan's Auditorium Building instead of private residences. However, other areas in Chicago such as Armour Square did have an unusual abundance of Romanesque townhouses.

== Preservation and relocation ==
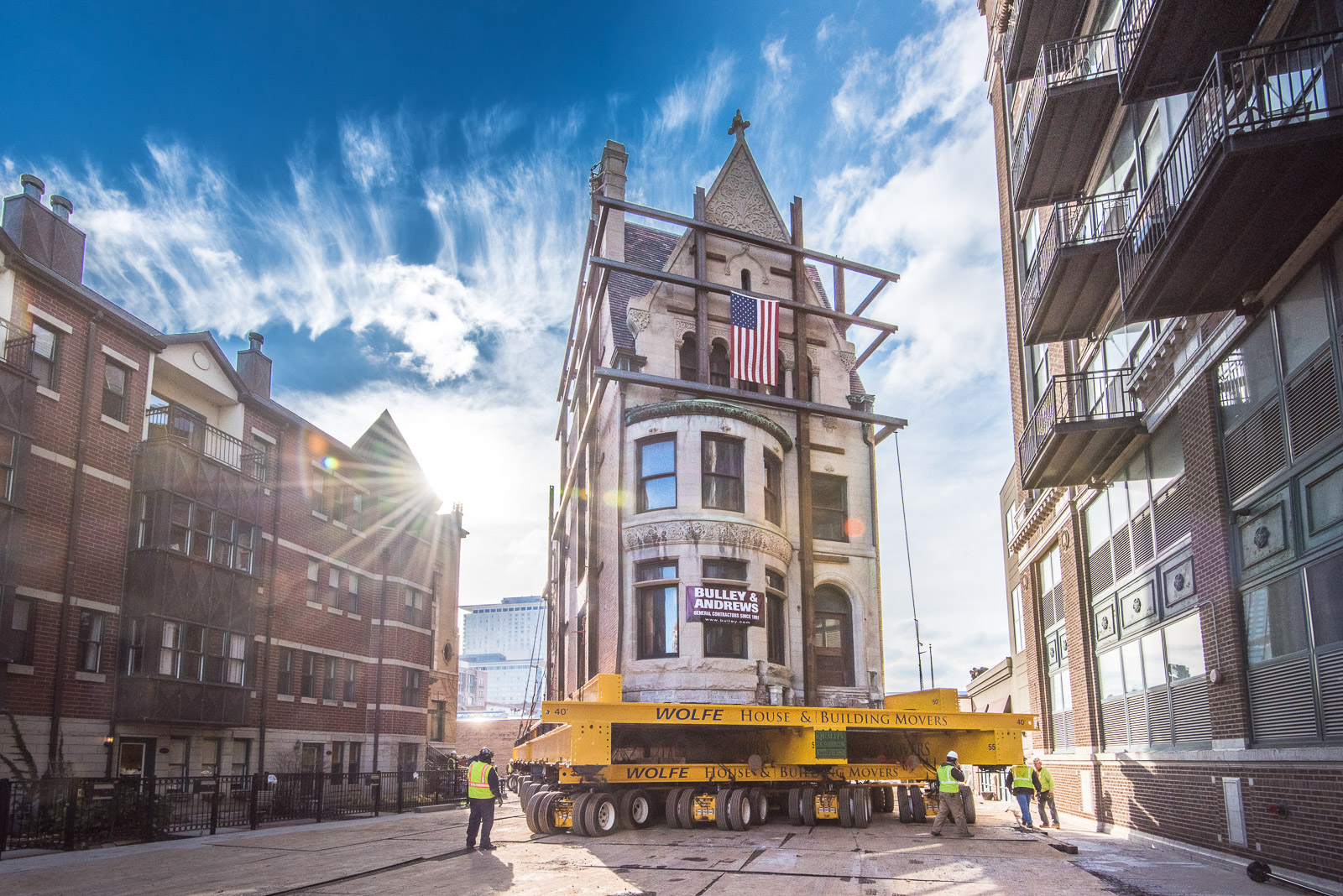
Wolfe House & Building Movers used the Buckingham Power Dolly System to move the Harriet Rees house in Chicago, Illinois (November 2014).

The house was recognized by the National Park Service with a listing on the National Register of Historic Places on May 22, 2007. Locally, it was recognized as a Chicago Landmark in 2012.

The house was threatened by the development of a new McCormick Place entertainment complex, which will include a basketball stadium for DePaul University and a 1,200-room Marriott Hotel. In lieu of demolishing the building, the Metropolitan Pier and Exposition Authority decided to preserve it by moving it across the street and north one block, at an expense of approximately $6 million, plus $1.9 million for the new lot. On October 1, 2014, the coach house was moved from 2110 S. Prairie Avenue to the new address at 2017 S. Prairie Avenue. The house was moved across the street and in the block north of its original location on November 11–12, 2014. It is one of the heaviest buildings ever moved in America. The move attracted interest as far away as Reno, Nevada.

== See also ==
- Edson Keith Estate, also owned by the Keiths
