= Cable House =

Building in Chicago

Coordinates: 41.8939°N 87.6271°W

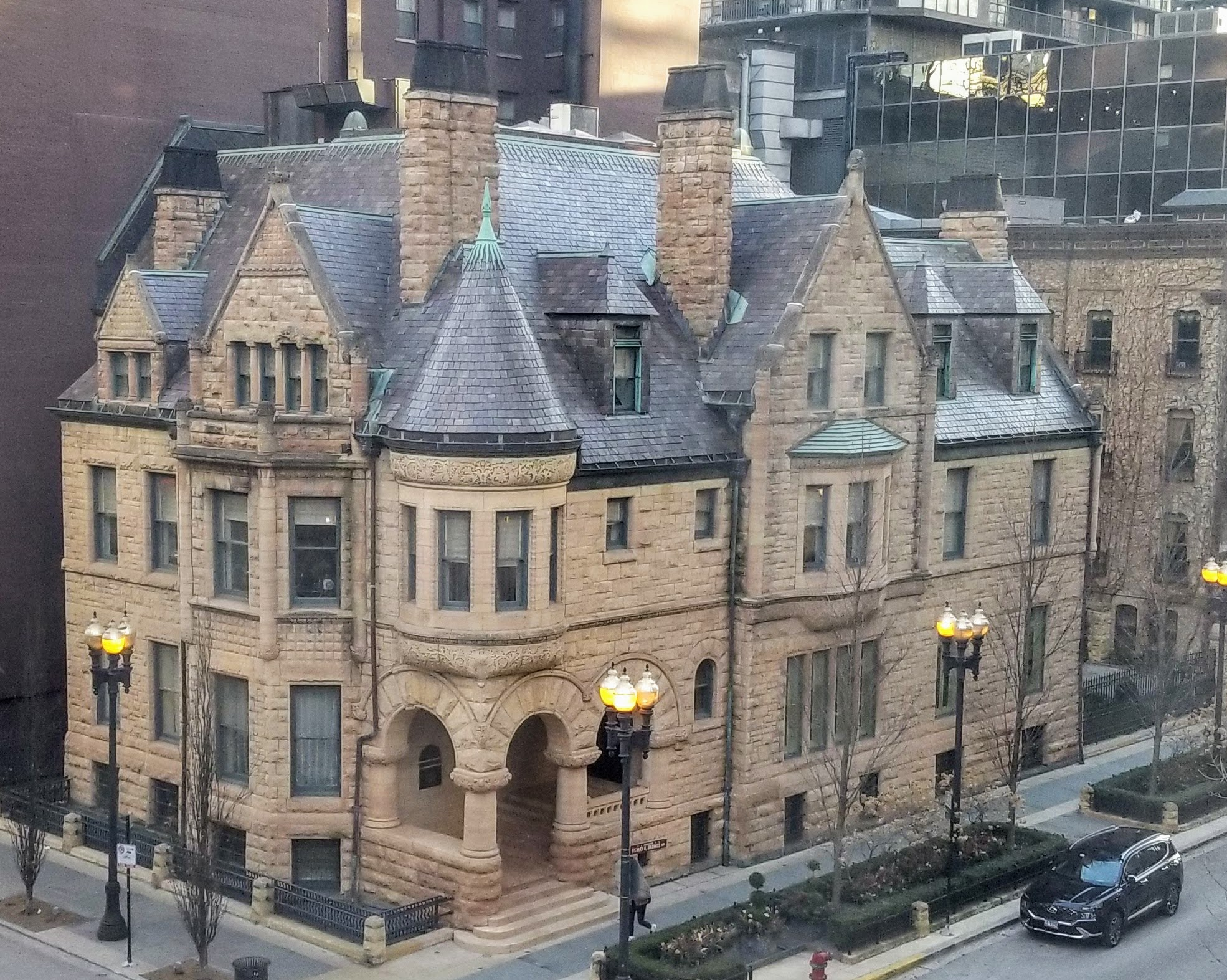
Cable House

The Cable House is a Richardsonian Romanesque-style house near Michigan Avenue at 25 E. Erie St. in Chicago, Illinois, United States. The house was built in 1886 by Cobb and Frost for socialite Ransom R. Cable. It was designated a Chicago Landmark on October 2, 1991.

In 1902, the house was purchased by Robert Hall McCormick for his son, Robert Hall McCormick III who was head of the McCormick Estate. The house was the accommodation for Guglielmo Marconi's visit to Chicago in 1917. McCormick III lived there with his family until 1926 when it was sold and became a funeral home. The house is located in a part of the Near North Side neighborhood west of Michigan Avenue that was once dubbed "McCormicksville," due to the concentration of McCormick family members living there within a few blocks of each other.

The Cable House is currently occupied by the offices of Driehaus Capital Management, which was operated by Chicago financier, preservationist and philanthropist Richard H. Driehaus. His Richard H. Driehaus Museum is located across the intersection in the historic Edward J. Burling-designed Samuel M. Nickerson House at 40 E. Erie St.

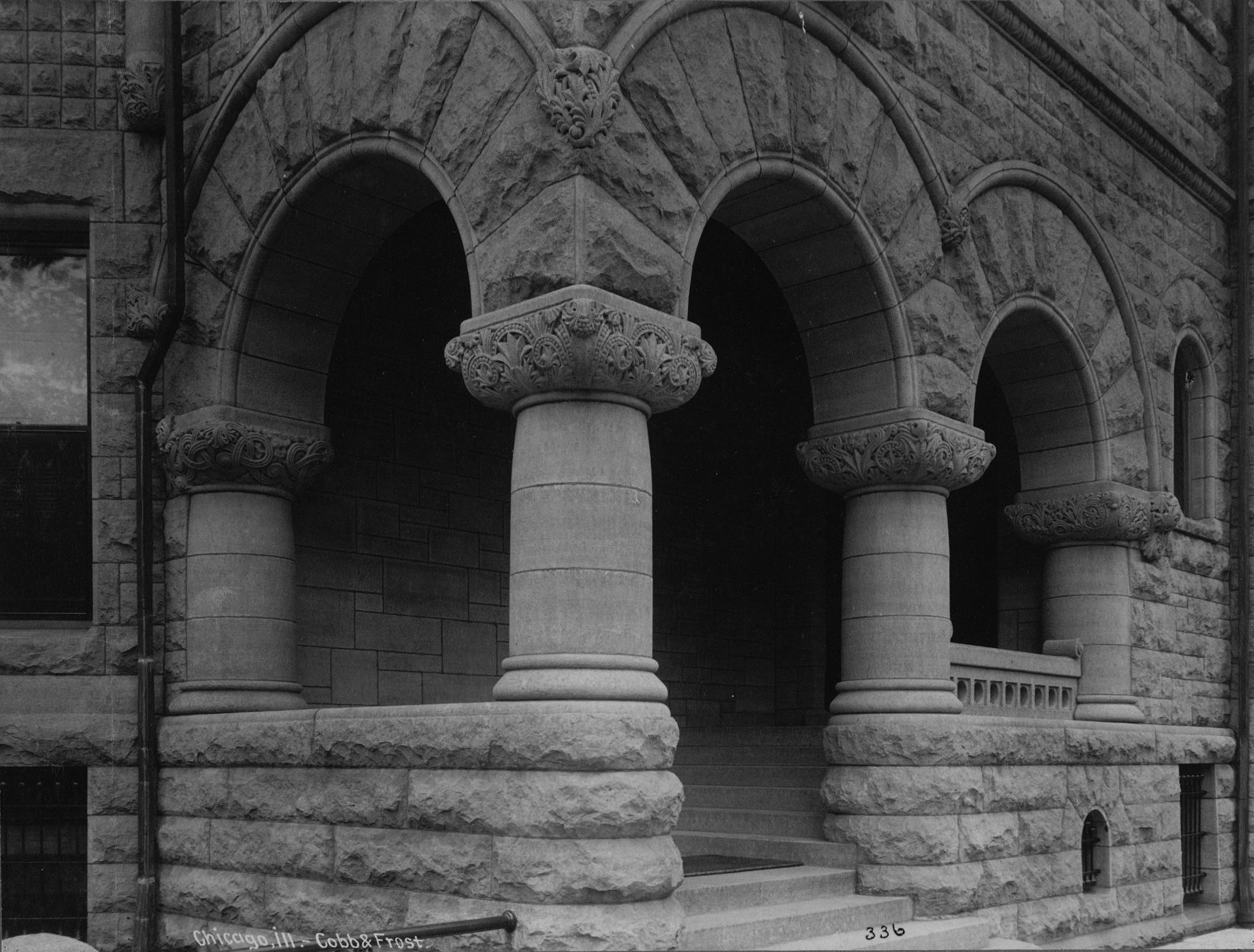
Entrance to the Ransom R. Cable House, albumen print, ca. 1895-1896
