= Navy Pier Auditorium =

Building in Chicago, Illinois, USA

Coordinates: 41.89184°N 87.59943°W

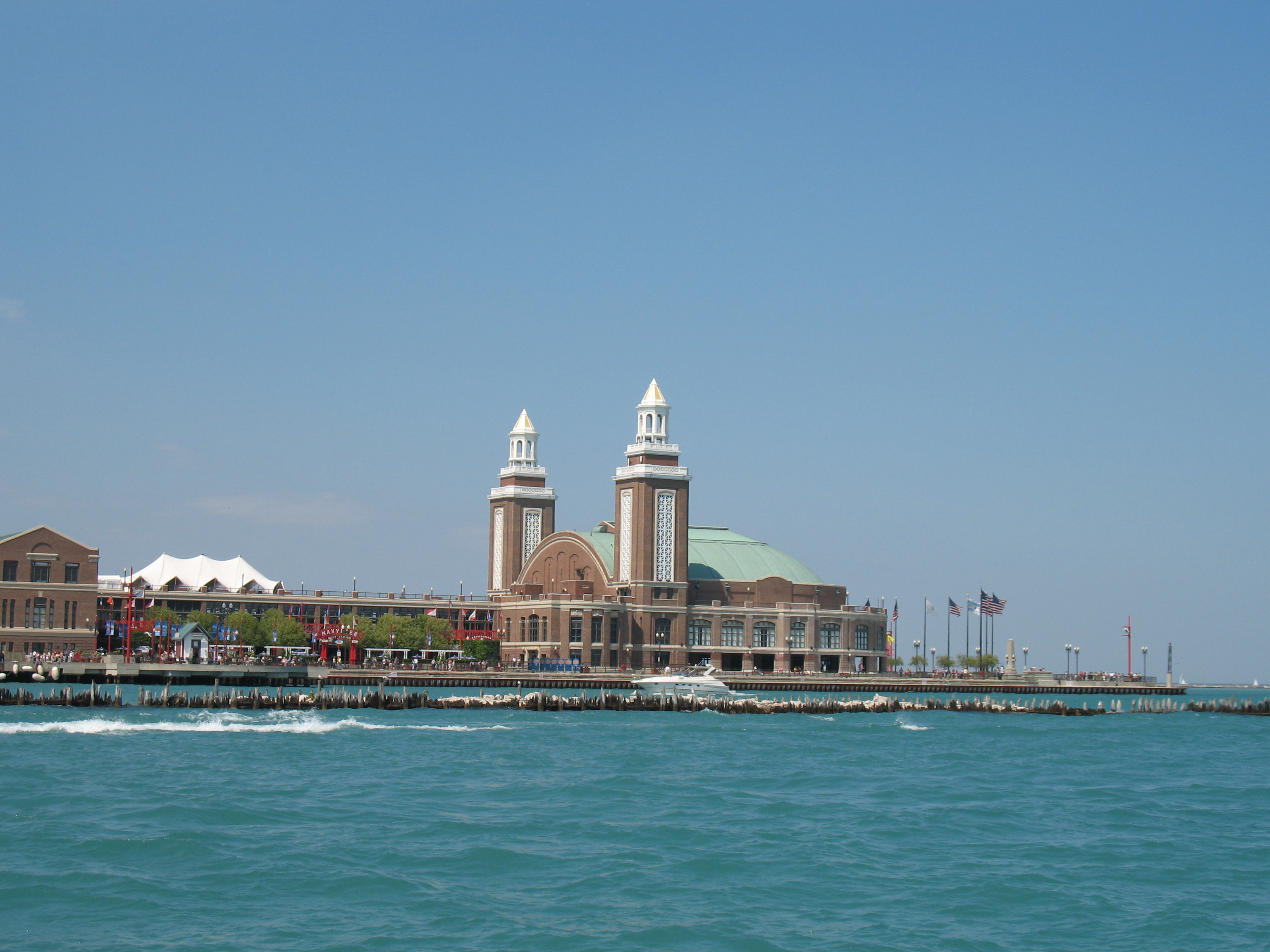
Navy Pier Auditorium

The Navy Pier Auditorium, designed by the architect Charles Sumner Frost and constructed in 1916, is located at the east end of Navy Pier in Chicago and is also known as the Hall. The Navy Pier Auditorium consists of the Festival Hall and the Aon Grand Ballroom.

== History ==
In 1992, The Festival Hall had construction work done as a result of it being a part of the $150 million renovation plan. To help regain attention to Navy Pier, the Aon Grand Ballroom went under construction in 1976. After the reconstruction, the entire Pier was named a Chicago landmark. Originally called the Grand Ballroom, it was renamed in 2015 to honor the contribution of Aon Corporation.

== Dimensions ==
The Festival Hall is made up of 170,000 square feet and the ceiling is 60 feet tall. The Hall has the option to be split into two halls; Hall A takes up 113,000 square feet while Hall B takes the rest of the 57,000 square feet. With the Festival Hall, there is access to an eight truck dock that can be used to load or unload equipment, chairs, and all other items needed for an event. The Ballroom has an 80-foot dome and with 18,000 square feet, it has the ability to hold a total of 1,400 people inside. The elevated stage gives the opportunity to have live music or performances. Chicago musicians that have performed at Navy Pier include Chicago in '79 for ChicagoFest, Cheap Trick in '82, Buddy Guy in '93, Wilco in '95 (the year Navy Pier opened to the public), Milwaukee's BoDeans in '99, South Bend's Umphrey's McGee in '05 on the Skyline Stage, Local H in '14 in the Grand Ballroom, and Kaskade in '13. Other musicians that have performed there include James Brown in '65, Frank Sinatra in '82, the Beach Boys in '82, BB King in '96, Jimmy Buffett in '97, Blue Öyster Cult in '98, Weird Al Yankovic in '99, Alice Cooper in '03, Skrillex in '14, and Sheryl Crow in '15.

== Events ==
In order to have an event at the Festival Hall, a proposal needs to be given to Navy Pier through their website. In order to have an event at The Aon Grand Ballroom, a proposal needs to be given to Navy Pier through their website.

Festival Hall Events:

1986

- Didar-e-Ummid: A series of religious ceremonies during the visit (Padhramni) of His Highness Prince Aga Khan and the Begum Aga Khan in November 1986 took place at Navy Pier Auditorium for members of the Ismaili Muslim Community of USA.

2016

- The Ideal Home Show Chicago: An attendance of close to 200 vendors offered advice, deals, and ideas to attendees that were looking to redecorate or renovate their homes.

2017

- Chicago Flower and Garden Show: A week long event that included all types of different flowers and plants for attendees to explore. There was also an area for kids to participate in.
- EXPO CHICAGO: A benefit artwork show which included artwork from 145 different galleries.
- World Congress: An educational event that promotes networking and training for various careers.

2018

- I Heart Halal Festival: An educational event on the Halal lifestyle full of food demonstrations, panels, and much more.
- AccessChicago: An event that present products and services through workshops and seminars to help those who are disabled.

Aon Grand Ballroom Events:

2012

- Undocumented Immigration Help: In 2012, the Aon Grand Ballroom was used to help young undocumented immigrants with the application process. There were so many people eager to get help that the line to get in went all the way down Navy Pier.

2016

- Chicago Police Department Graduation: In February 2016, one hundred and eighty five officers participated in the ceremony.

2017

- Chicago Resolution Gala: For the past six years, to kick off the year, the ballroom has been used to celebrate New Year's Eve.
- USO Star Spangled Salute Gala: The gala helps raise money for USO programs and the local military and their families. At the 2017 gala, Susan Schneider-Williams, widow of Robin Williams, was the guest of honor.

2018

- Chicago Ale Fest (Winter Edition): Explored 150 different beers that are not available in the summer time.
- First Bites Bash: Began the 12th year of Chicago Restaurant Week in the Aon Grand Ballroom. Sixty of Chicago's chefs and restaurants were in attendance.
