= Leavenworth Riverfront Community Center =

- Union Depot
- U.S. National Register of Historic Places
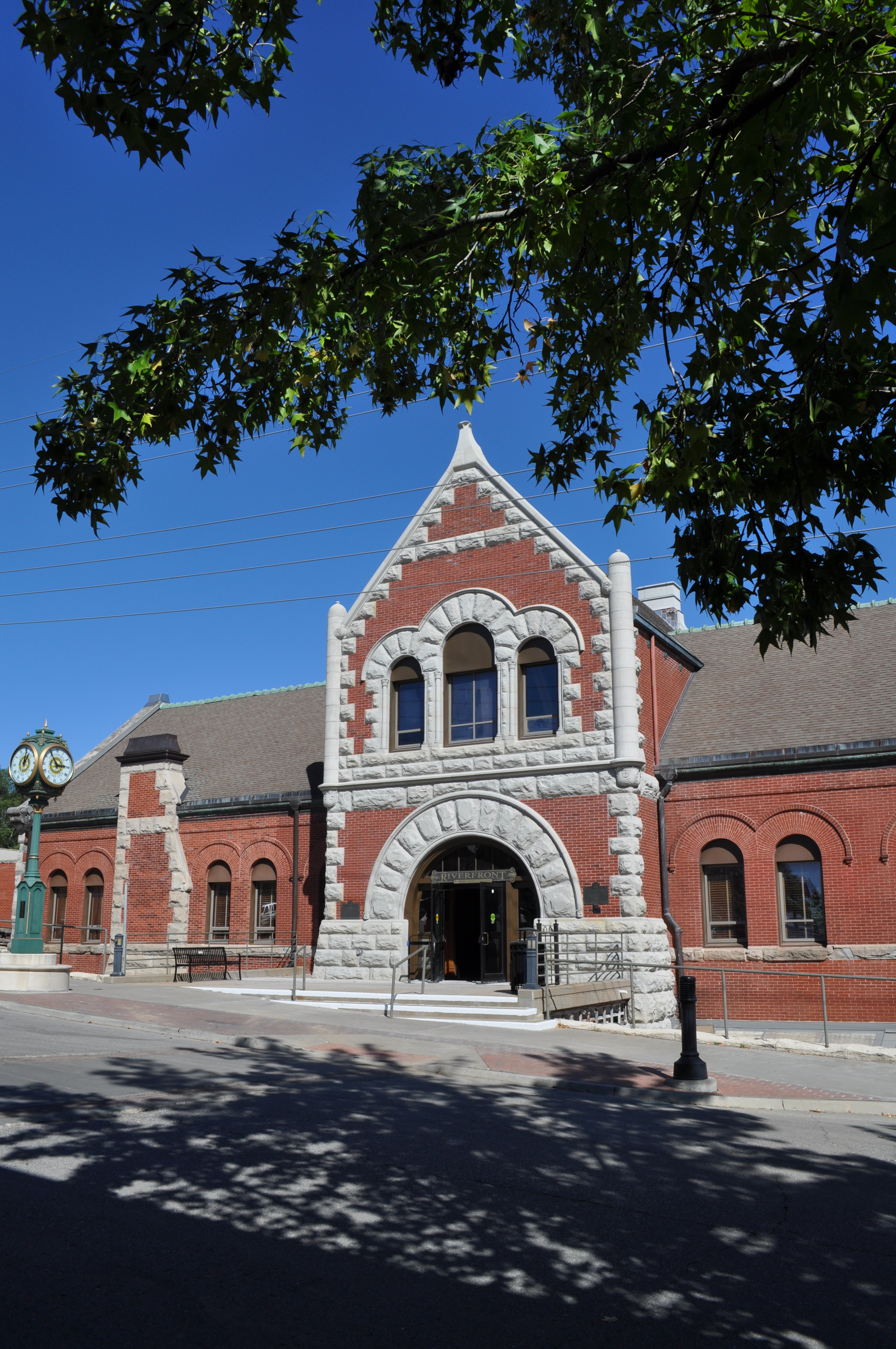

- Location within Kansas Location within the United States
- Location: 123 N. Esplanade St, Leavenworth, Kansas, 66043 USA
- Coordinates: 39°19′7″N 94°54′33″W
- Built: 1888
- Built by: James A. McGonigle
- Architect: Cobb and Frost
- Architectural style: Romanesque Revival
- Restored: 1988, 2014
- NRHP reference No.: 82002663
- Added to NRHP: March 11, 1987

Leavenworth Riverfront Community Center was a former Union Pacific railroad station located in Leavenworth, Kansas, United States. It is also known as the Old Union Depot when it was listed on the National Register of Historic Places (NRHP) in 1987. It is currently known as the Leavenworth Riverfront Community Center.

== History ==
It was built as a Union Pacific Railroad Depot in 1888 by James A. McGonigle, to a design by the Chicago architecture firm Cobb and Frost.

In 1984, V.B. Greenamyre and Family sold the building to the city of Leavenworth. Using funds from a bond issue, the depot was renovated with a basketball gym, cardiovascular fitness room, weight and strength training room, racquetball courts, an indoor pool, activity rooms, meeting rooms and a 1/10-of a mile indoor walking track. The facility opened to the public in 1988, 100 years after its construction.

A newer South Wing Room was remodeled in 2012. The facility's brick and sandstone exterior began renovations in 2014. The city of Leavenworth received a grant from the Kansas State Department of Transportation in 2010 to replace the sandstone

== Current facility ==
The Leavenworth Parks and Recreation Department staffs this facility and manages maintenance, room rentals and activity programs. It is open Monday through Friday from 6 a.m. to 8 p.m., Saturdays 9 a.m. to 5 p.m. and Sundays 1 p.m. to 5 p.m.

== Gallery ==
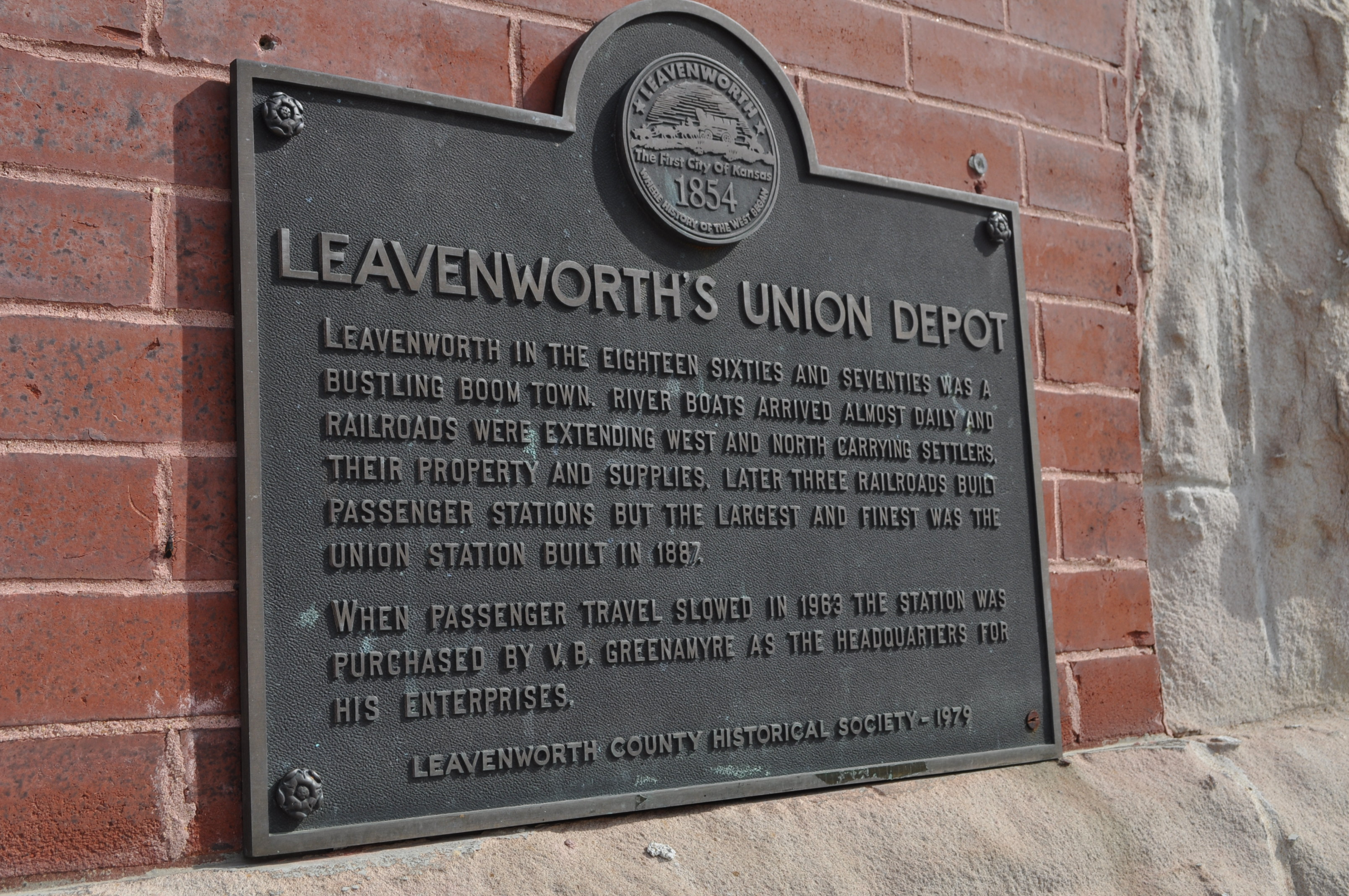
Historical plaque on the Riverfront Community Center

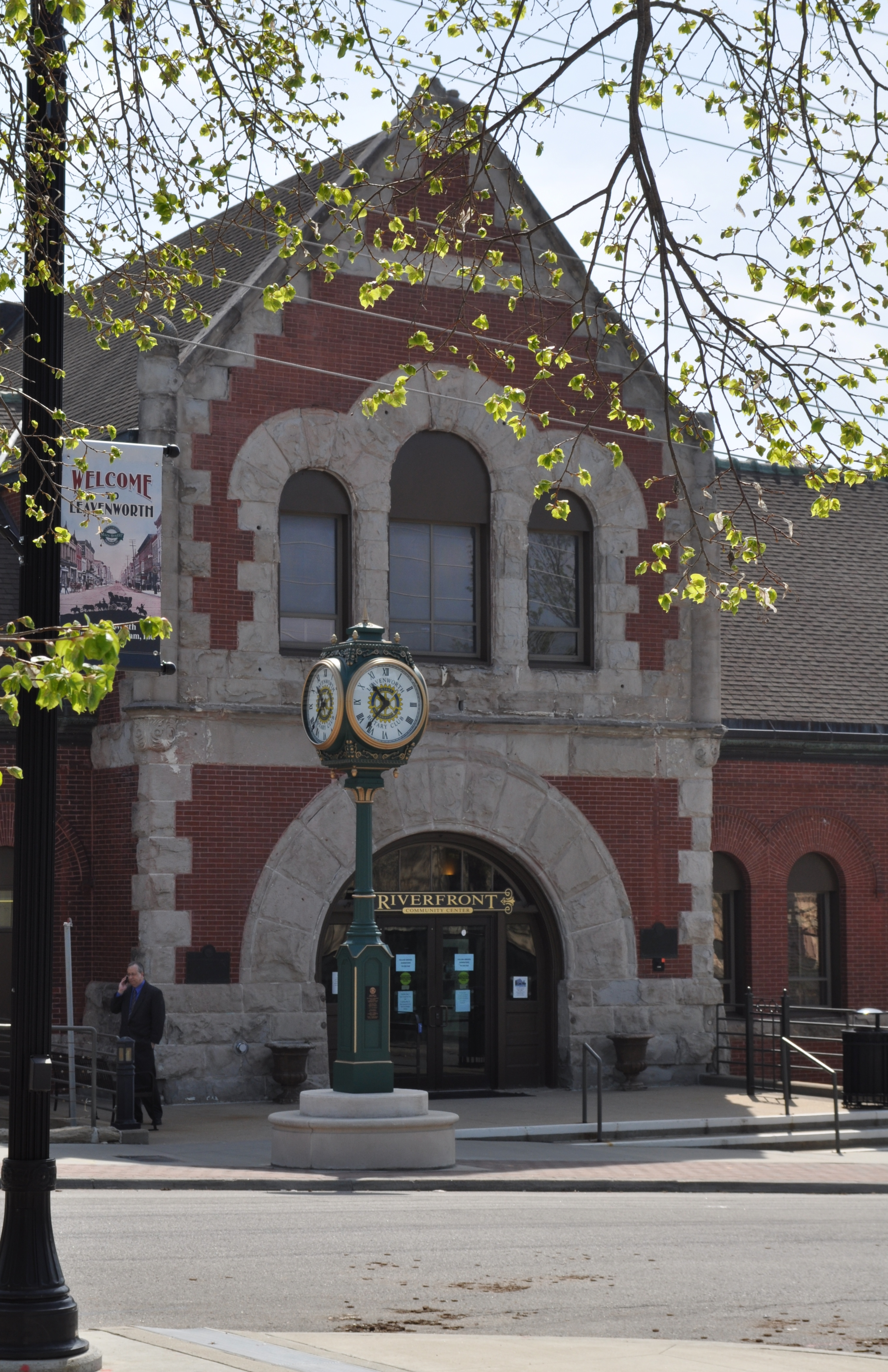

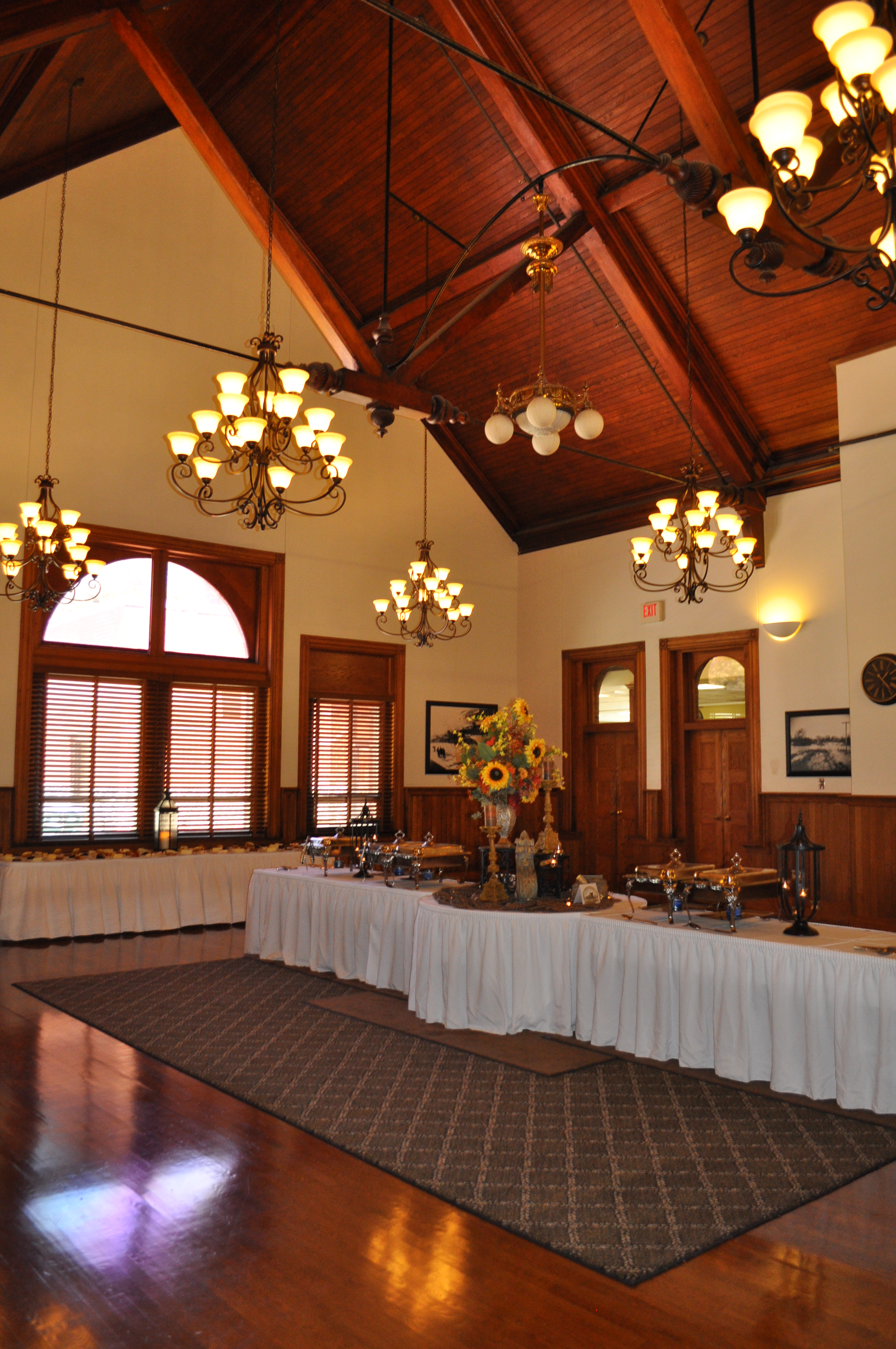

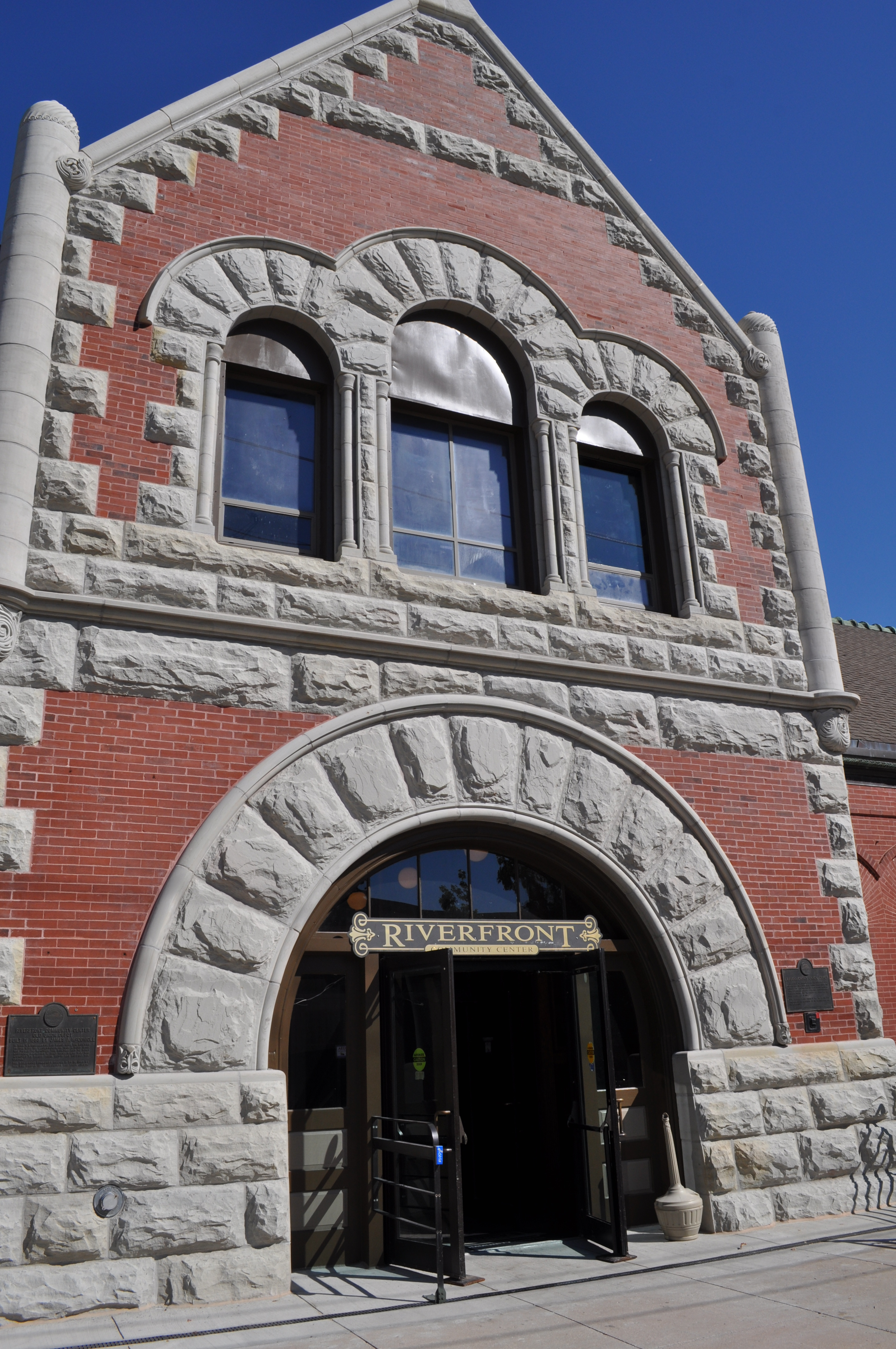

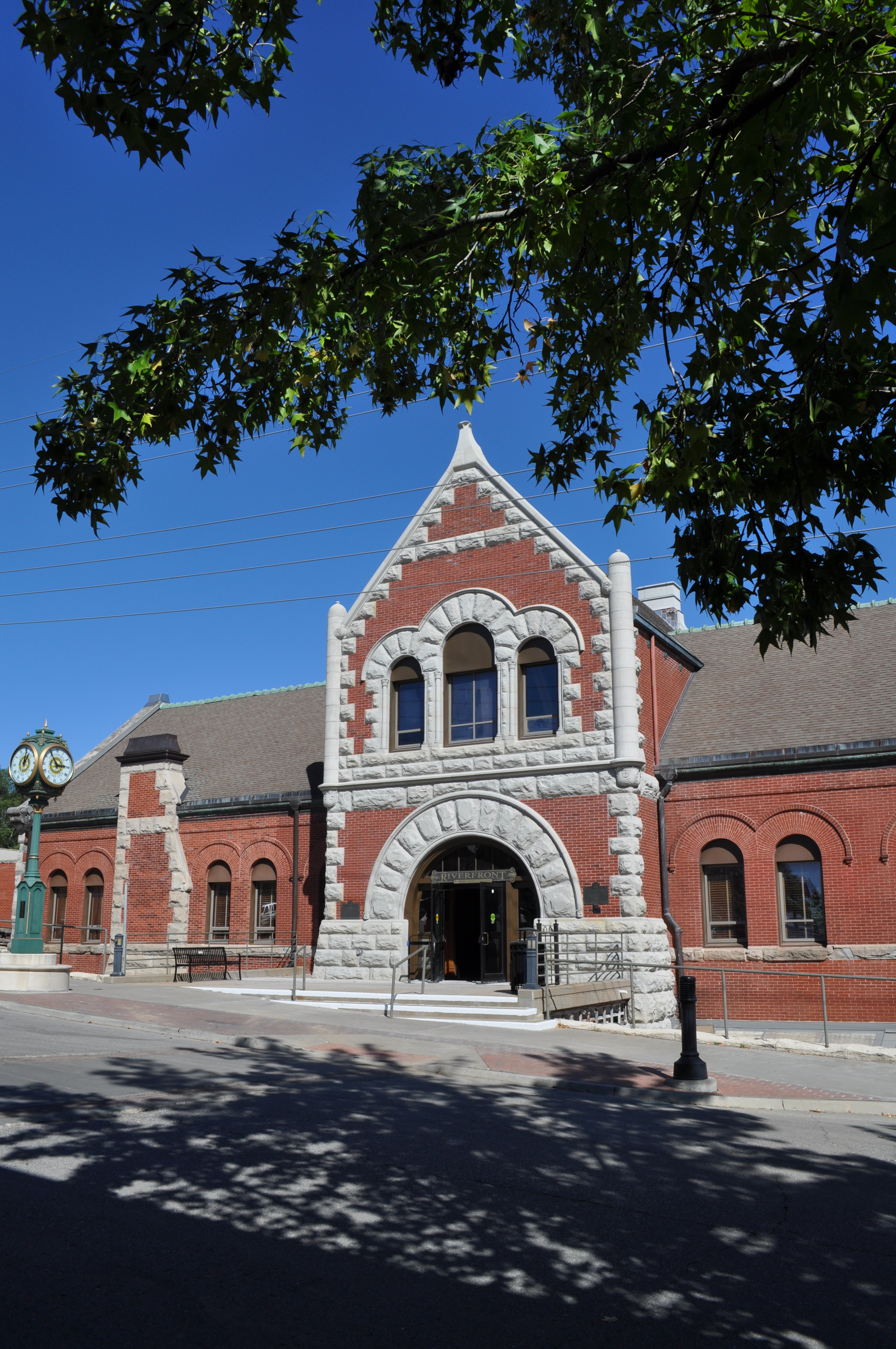

== See also ==
- National Register of Historic Places listings in Leavenworth County, Kansas
