= Clyman Subdivision =

Rail line in Wisconsin, United States

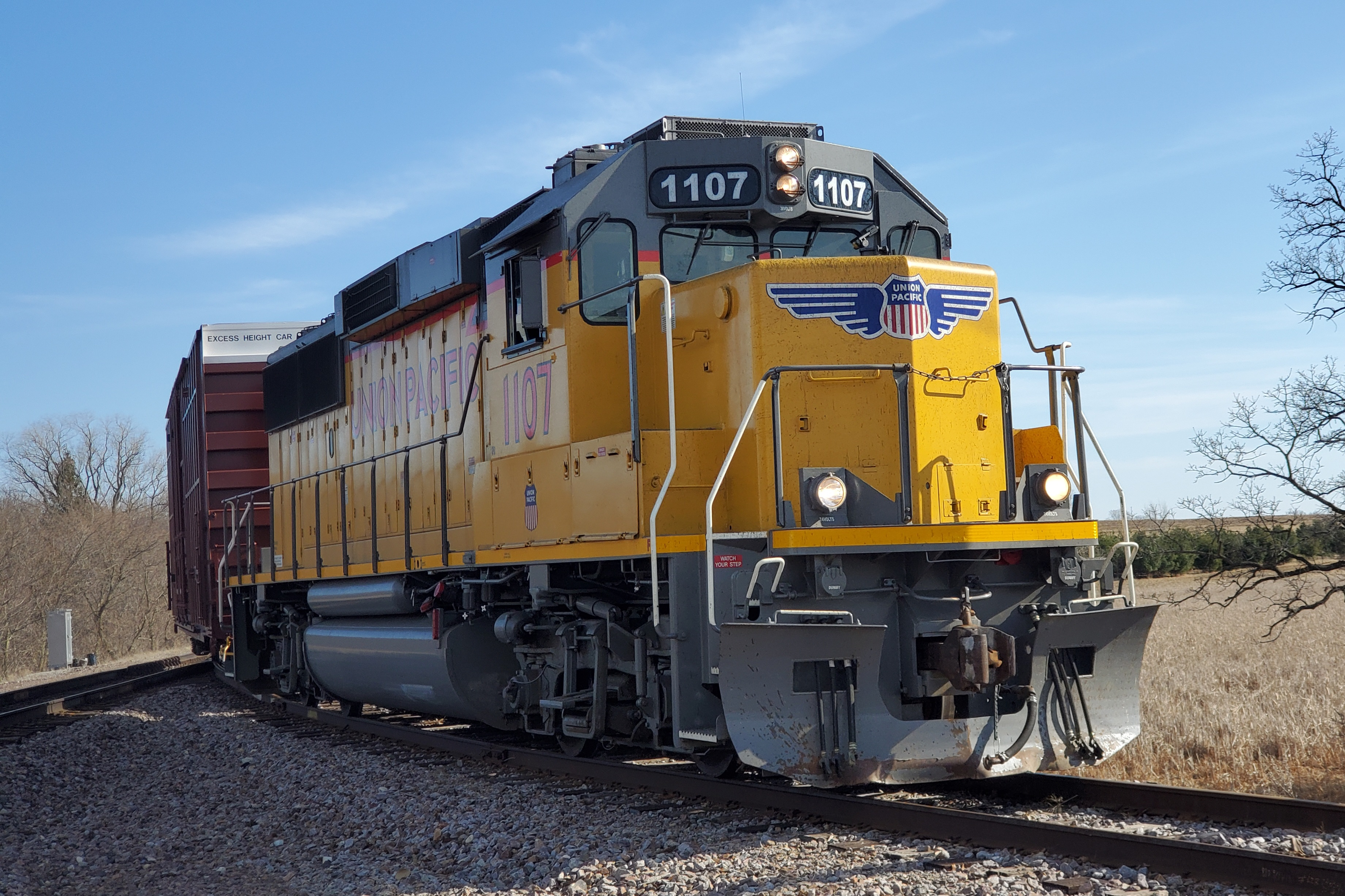
- UP 1107, an EMD GP60, leads a train onto the Clyman Sub in Clyman Junction

Overview
- Status: Active
- Owner: Union Pacific Railroad
- Locale: Wisconsin
- Termini: Clyman Junction; Fort Atkinson

Service
- Type: Freight
- Operator: Union Pacific Railroad

Technical
- Line length: 28 mi (45 km)
- Num of tracks: 1
- Track gauge: 4 ft 8 1/2 in (1,435 mm) standard gauge

The Clyman Subdivision or Clyman Sub is a 28-mile (45 km) railway line owned and operated by the Union Pacific Railroad. It branches off of the Adams Subdivision to the south in Clyman Junction, Wisconsin, and continues south to Fort Atkinson, Wisconsin, where the line terminates. It is a segment of the former Chicago and North Western Railway line that was nicknamed the “Old Line”, which ran from Fond du Lac to Janesville. It is used by a single local train (LBU53C) that serves the Aztalan Bio plant and Purina Mills spurs in Jefferson, WI.
