= Sycamore station (Illinois) =

Sycamore
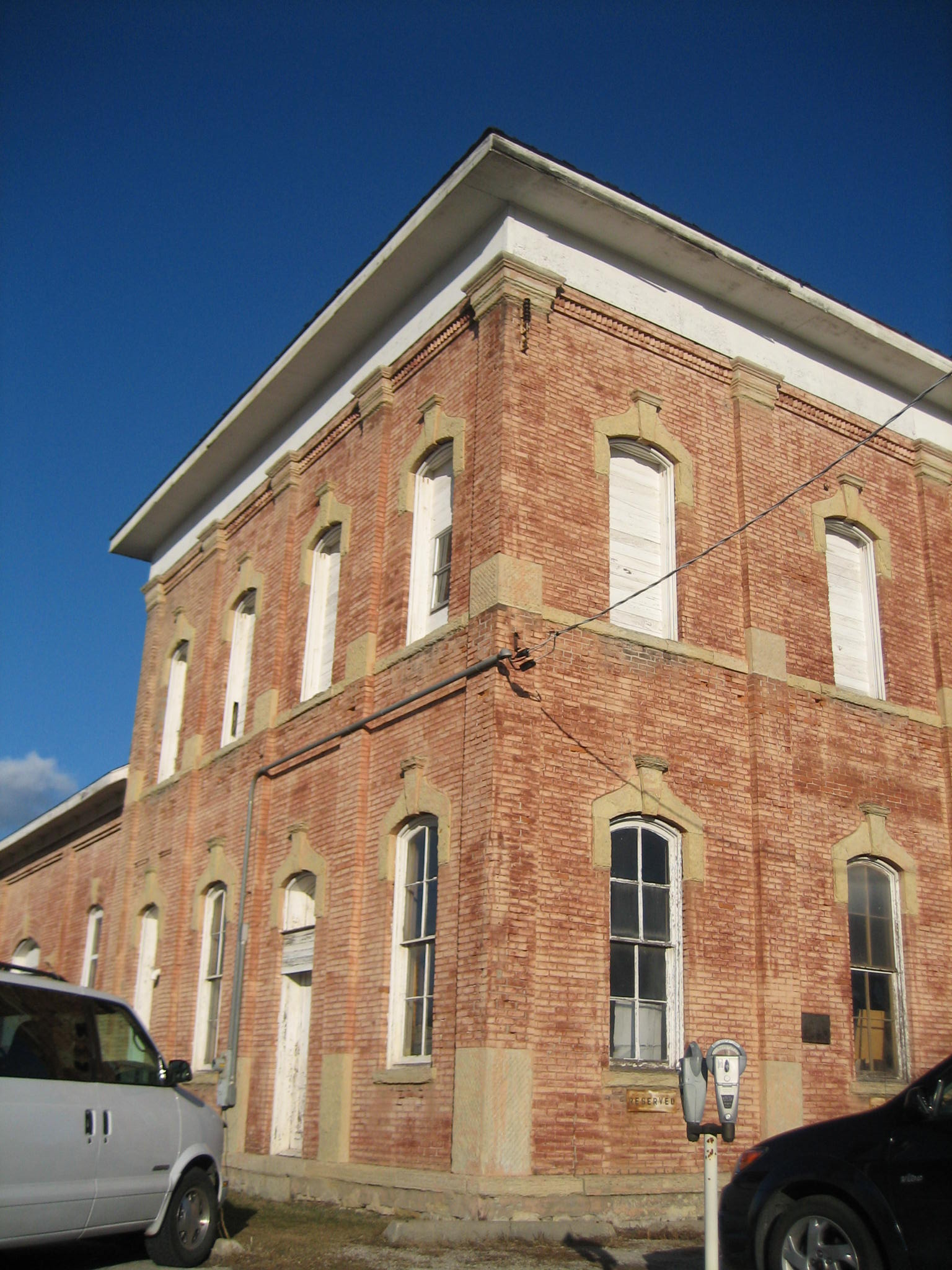

General information
- Location: Sacramento and DeKalb Sts., Sycamore, Illinois
- Coordinates: 41°59′2″N 88°41′39″W
- System: Former Chicago and North Western Railway station

Construction
- Structure type: At-grade

History
- Opened: 1865

Services
Preceding station	Chicago and North Western Railway	Following station
Henrietta toward Belvidere	Belvidere – Spring Valley	DeKalb toward Spring Valley
Services at Main Street Station
Preceding station	Chicago Great Western Railway	Following station
Clare toward Omaha	Omaha – Chicago	Richardson toward Chicago
- Chicago and Northwestern Depot
- U.S. National Register of Historic Places
- Location within Illinois Location within the United States
- Location: Sacramento and DeKalb Sts., Sycamore, Illinois
- Coordinates: 41°59′2″N 88°41′39″W
- Area: less than one acre
- Built: 1865
- NRHP reference No.: 78003101
- Added to NRHP: December 8, 1978
Location

The Chicago and Northwestern Depot is a historic railway station located at the northeast corner of Sacramento and DeKalb Streets in Sycamore, Illinois. The station was built in 1865 to serve as Sycamore's main railway station. While Sycamore was bypassed by the Chicago and Northwestern Railway (C&NW) in the early 1850s, several community leaders developed and built the Sycamore, Cortland, and Chicago Railway to link Sycamore to the C&NW at Cortland. The original line, which opened in 1855, lacked an engine and pulled railcars by mule; as the railway became more successful, it was able to purchase an engine and build the station in Sycamore. The station has an Italianate design which resembles contemporary DeKalb architecture but is noticeably different from the standardized depots built elsewhere in the C&NW system. The branch and station were acquired by the C&NW in 1883.

The station was added to the National Register on December 8, 1978. At the time of its listing, it was being used as a warehouse by ITT-Holub Industries.
