= Fond du Lac station =

- Chicago and Northwestern Railroad Depot
- U.S. National Register of Historic Places
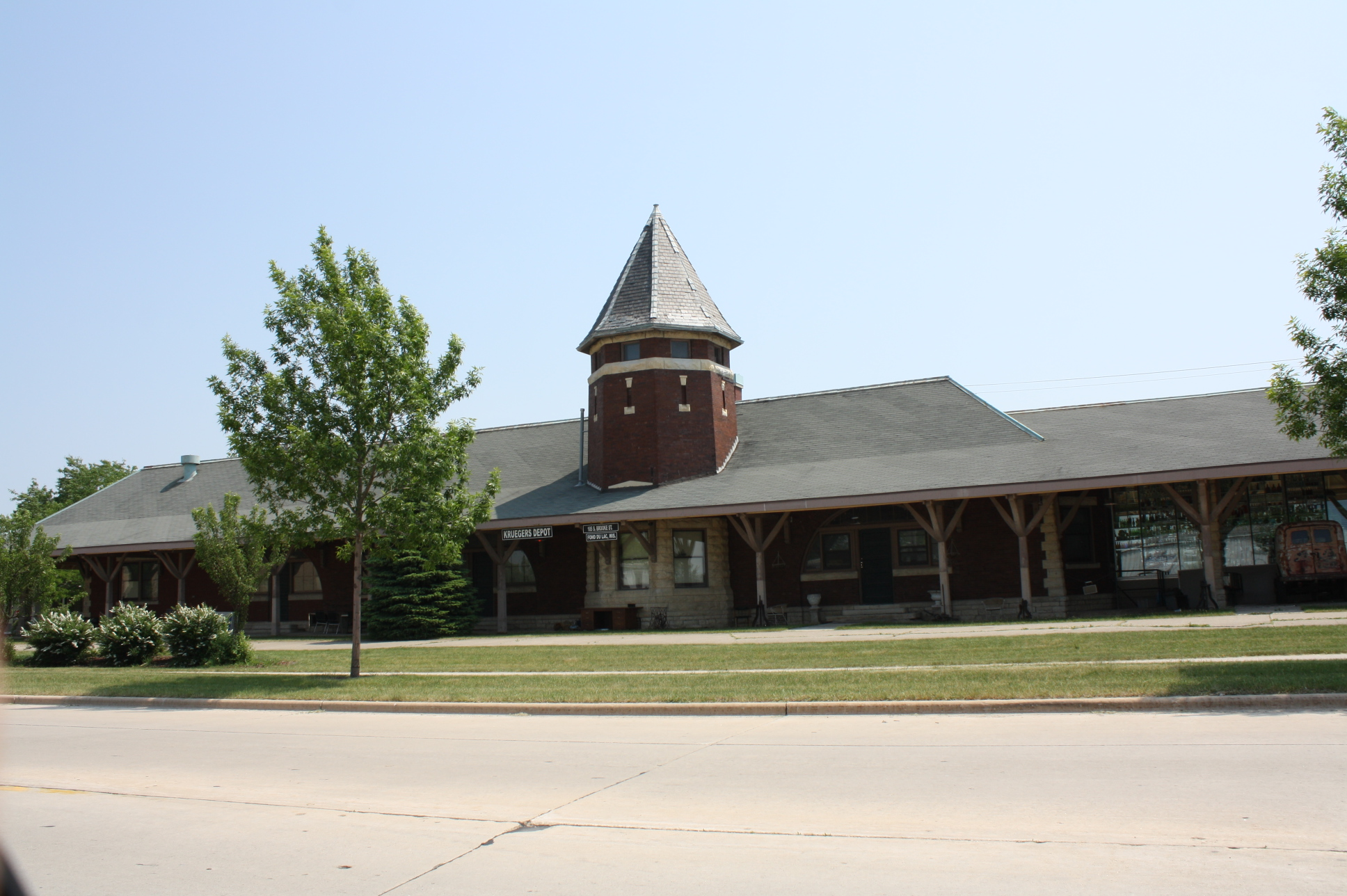
- The former C&NW Depot from Brooke Street.

- Location within Wisconsin Location within the United States
- Location: 105 S. Brooke st., Fond du Lac, Wisconsin
- Coordinates: 43°46′34″N 88°27′13″W
- Area: less than one acre
- Built: 1891
- Architect: Charles Sumner Frost
- Architectural style: Romanesque
- NRHP reference No.: 90001232
- Added to NRHP: August 10, 1990

The Chicago and Northwestern Railroad Depot is a historic former railroad station in Fond du Lac, Wisconsin. The station is located on the southeast corner of Forest Avenue and Brooke Street.

Rail service in Fond du Lac can be traced as far back as 1852, although Fond du Lac was also the namesake of the former Chicago, St. Paul and Fond du Lac Railroad, which existed from 1855 to 1859 before going bankrupt and being acquired by the Chicago and Northwestern Railway. In 1891 C&NW replaced the original station with the current one. The building's architect was Charles Sumner Frost. A near-identical twin station was built, also in 1891, in DeKalb, Illinois.

The station served trains such as the Flambeau 400 and Peninsula 400 until it was closed in 1975, well after most intercity passenger service in the United States was turned over to Amtrak in 1971, which never used this station.

The Chicago and Northwestern Railroad Depot was added to the National Register of Historic Places on August 10, 1990.

A meticulous restoration and repurposing began in 2021 The depot re-opened to the public in 2025 Via The Passenger Lounge, A live music venue and event space which has been beautifully built into the passenger portion of the building. The former right-of-way is a rail trail. An active railroad line exists west of the station, but that line was operated by Soo Line and no longer contains a station nearby. The Milwaukee Road had a branch line between Iron Ridge and Fond Du Lac. It diverged from the Milwaukee to Oshkosh line and terminated at the station on Forest Street. The Milwaukee Road line north of River Knoll Drive in Mayville has since been abandoned.

Preceding station	Chicago and North Western Railway	Following station
Oshkosh toward Ishpeming	Ishpeming – Milwaukee	Eden toward Milwaukee
Taylor Park toward Janesville	Janesville – Fond du Lac	Terminus
Rosendale toward Marshfield	Marshfield – Fond du Lac	Terminus
Terminus	Fond du Lac – Sheboygan	Peeble's toward Sheboygan
services at Soo Line station
Preceding station	Soo Line	Following station
Van Dyne toward Portal	Main Line	Byron toward Chicago
