= Alfred Hoyt Granger =

American architect (1867–1939)

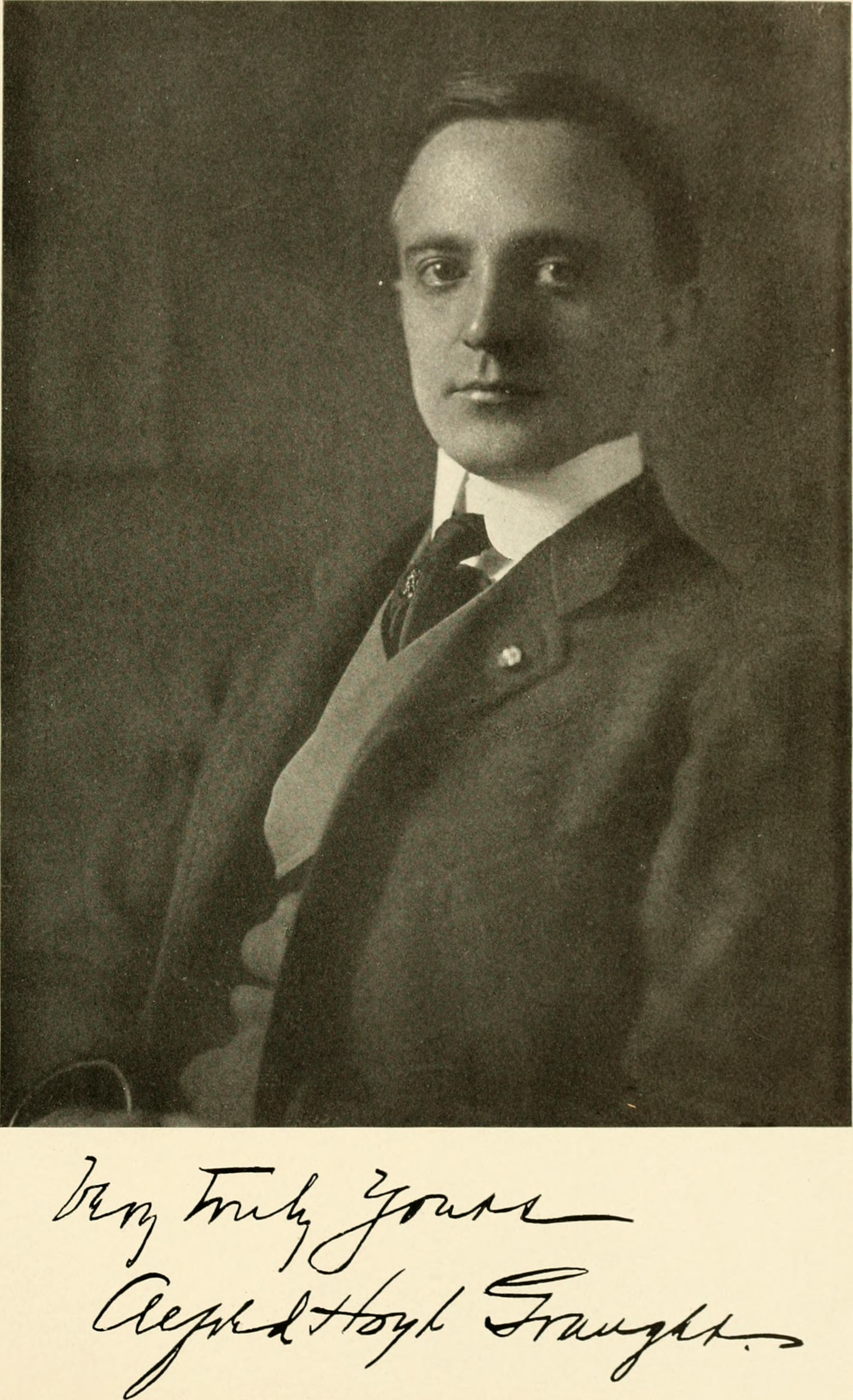
Alfred Hoyt Granger

Alfred Hoyt Granger (May 31, 1867 - December 3, 1939) was an American architect and author.

== Life ==
Alfred Hoyt Granger was born in Zanesville, Ohio, on May 31, 1867, the son of Judge Moses M. Granger and Mary Hoyt Reese. He earned a bachelor of arts degree from Kenyon College in 1887, and attended one term of graduate school at the Massachusetts Institute of Technology. He then studied in Paris from 1889 to 1891 at the École des Beaux-Arts, Atelier Pascal, and Academie Julian.

Granger worked briefly in the Boston offices of the architectural firm Shepley, Rutan and Coolidge, then moved with Coolidge to the firm's Chicago offices in 1891 to work on the Art institute for the 1893 World's Columbian Exposition. He then worked at Jenney and Mundie, and in private practice in Cleveland, Ohio, until 1893. Granger married Belle Hughitt, a daughter of Marvin Hughitt, President of the Chicago and North Western Railway, on October 4, 1893. He was a member of the partnership Granger and Meade with Frank B. Meade, whom he had met at Jenney and Mundie, in Cleveland from 1894 to 1898. The firm specialized in residential architecture. He returned to Chicago and formed the partnership Frost and Granger with his brother-in-law Charles Sumner Frost in Chicago from 1898 to 1910. The firm was known for its work designing stations for their father-in-law's railroad. After Frost and Granger dissolved Granger formed Hewitt and Granger with William D. Hewitt in Philadelphia from 1910 to 1917. Granger served during World War I as chairman of an emergency construction committee of the War Industries Board, and following the war, at the rank of captain, as the chief of the War Department's Public Works Section. He then worked in private practice in Chicago until 1924. He was a member of the Chicago firms Granger, Lowe and Bollenbacher from 1924 to 1930, and Granger and Bollenbacher from 1930 to 1936.

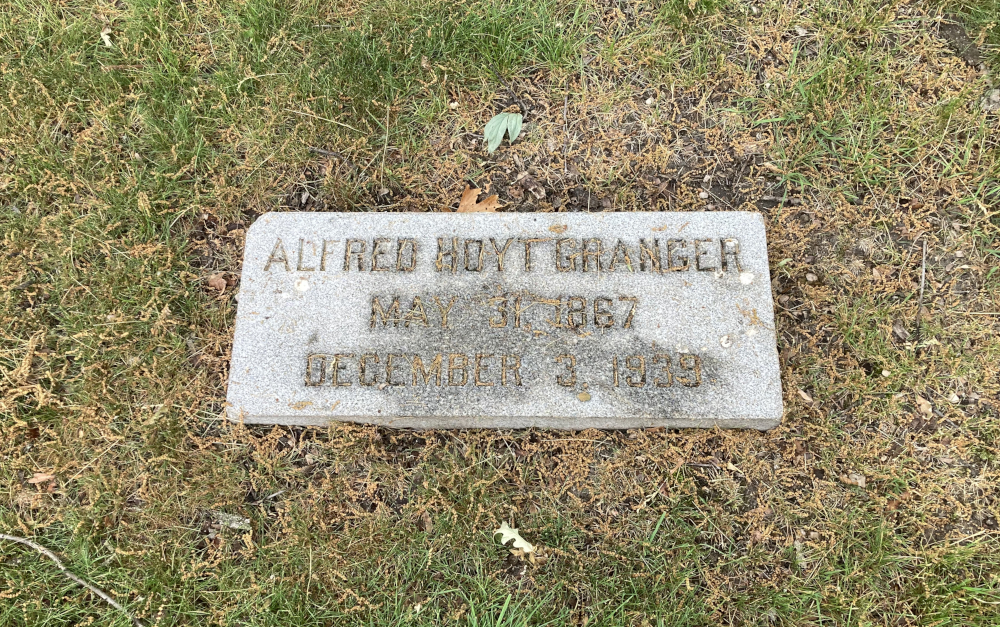
Granger's grave at Rosehill Cemetery

Granger died from a heart attack at his home in Roxbury, Connecticut on December 3, 1939, and was buried at Rosehill Cemetery in Chicago.

== Books ==
Granger wrote several architecture-related and other books:

- Charles Follen McKim: a Study of His Life and Work (1913)
- England's World Empire: Some Reflections Upon Its Growth and Policy (1916)
- A Modern Cathedral for an Industrial City (1923)
- An Architectural Oasis (1927)
- Chicago Welcomes You (1933) guidebook for the Century of Progress exhibition
- The Spirit of Vienna (1935)

== Gallery ==
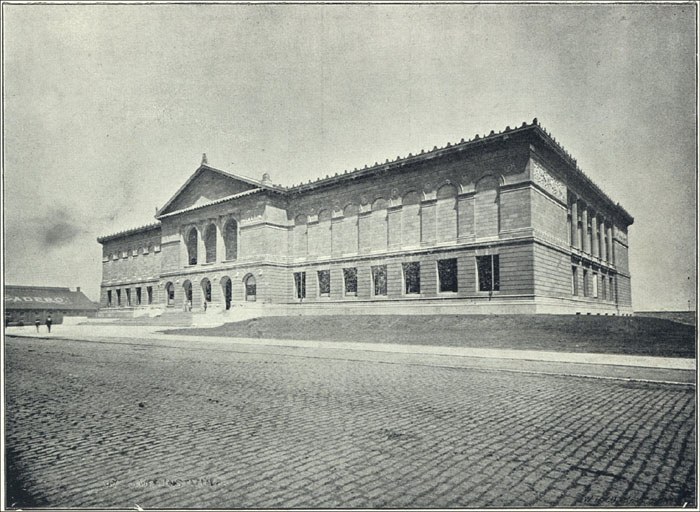
Art Institute, World Columbian Exposition, Chicago, 1893, Shepley, Rutan and Coolidge

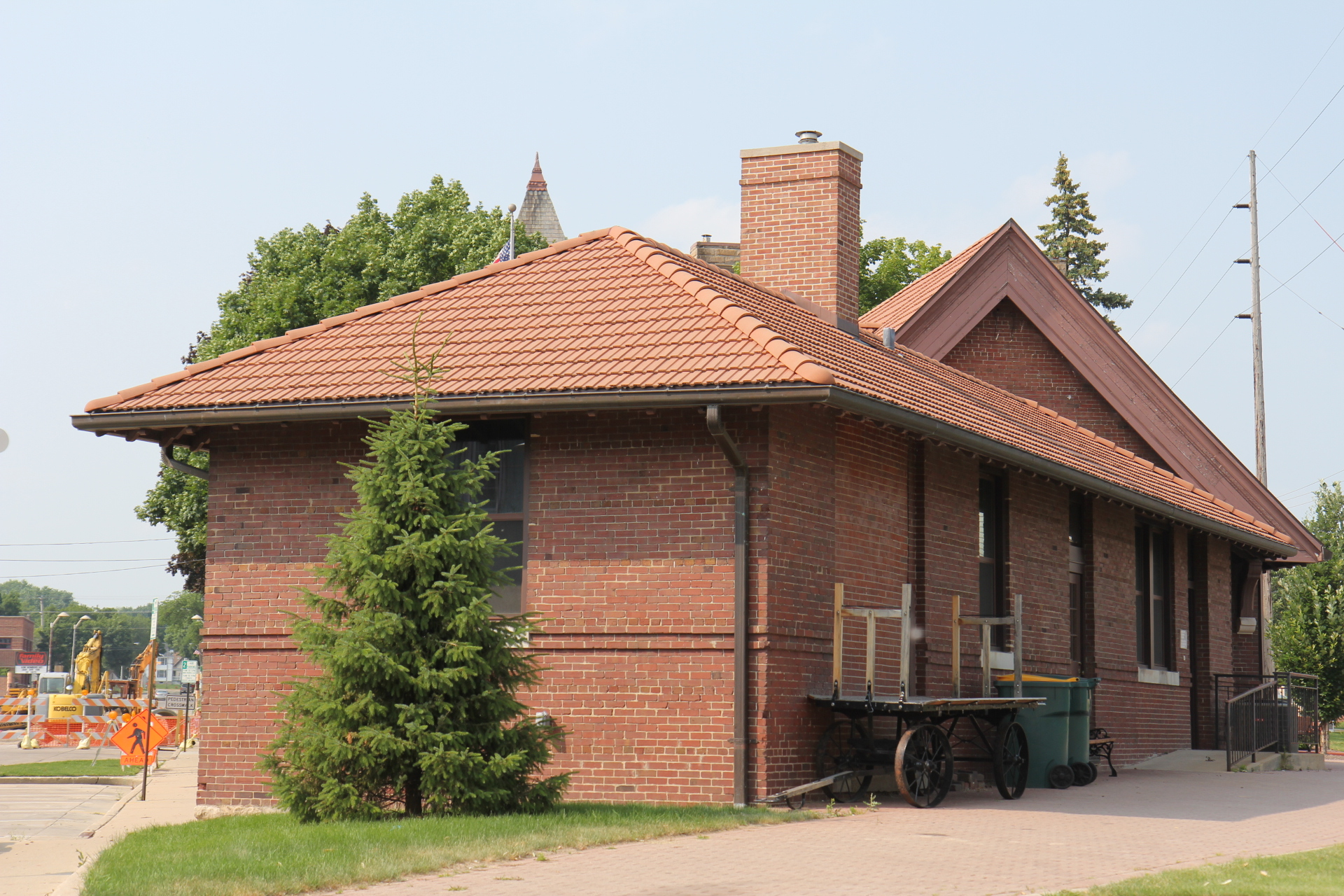
Chicago, Milwaukee and St. Paul Railway Company Passenger Depot, Beaver Dam, Wisconsin, 1900, Frost and Granger

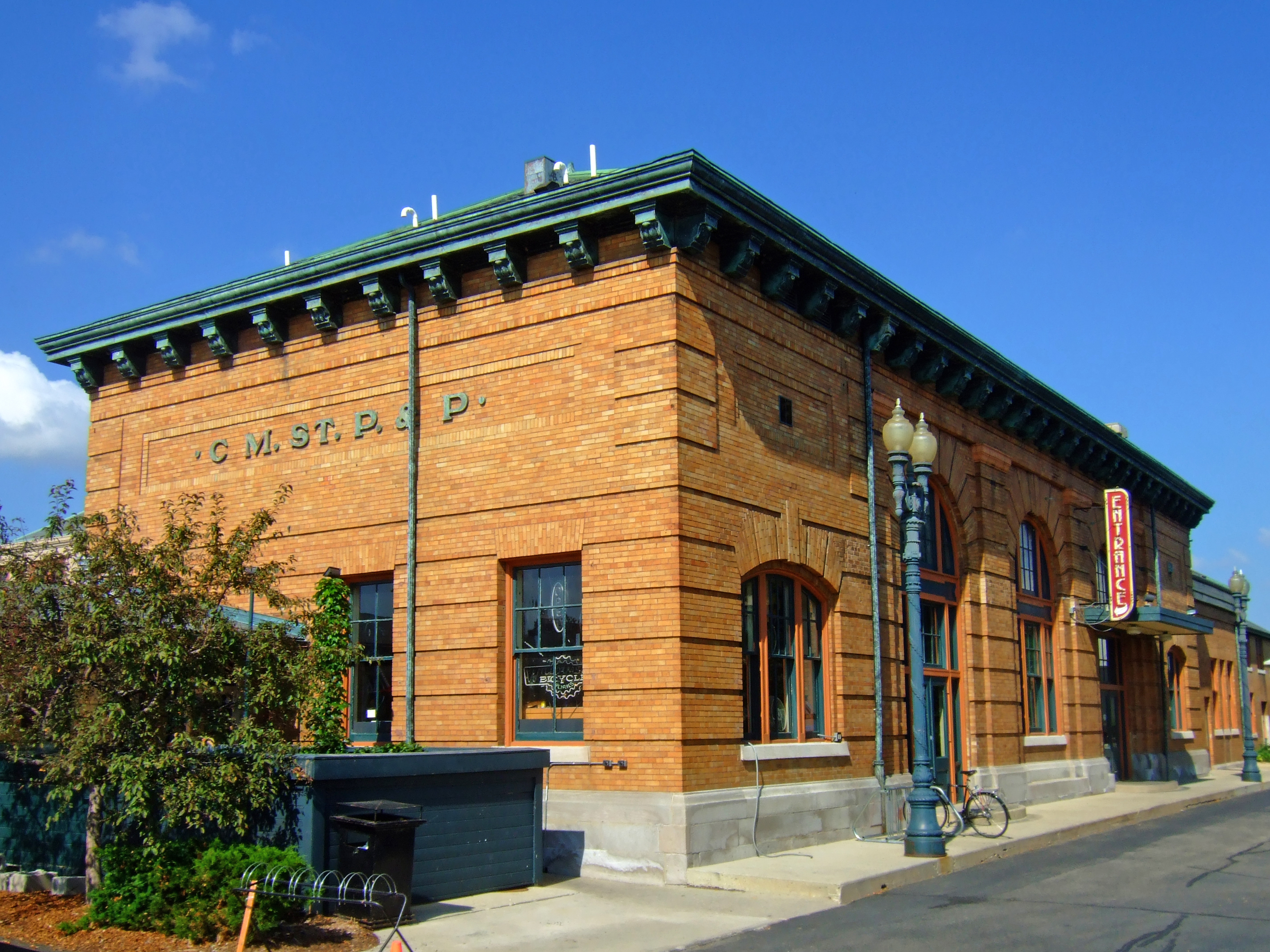
West Madison Depot, Chicago, Milwaukee, and St. Paul Railway, Madison, Wisconsin, 1903, Frost and Granger

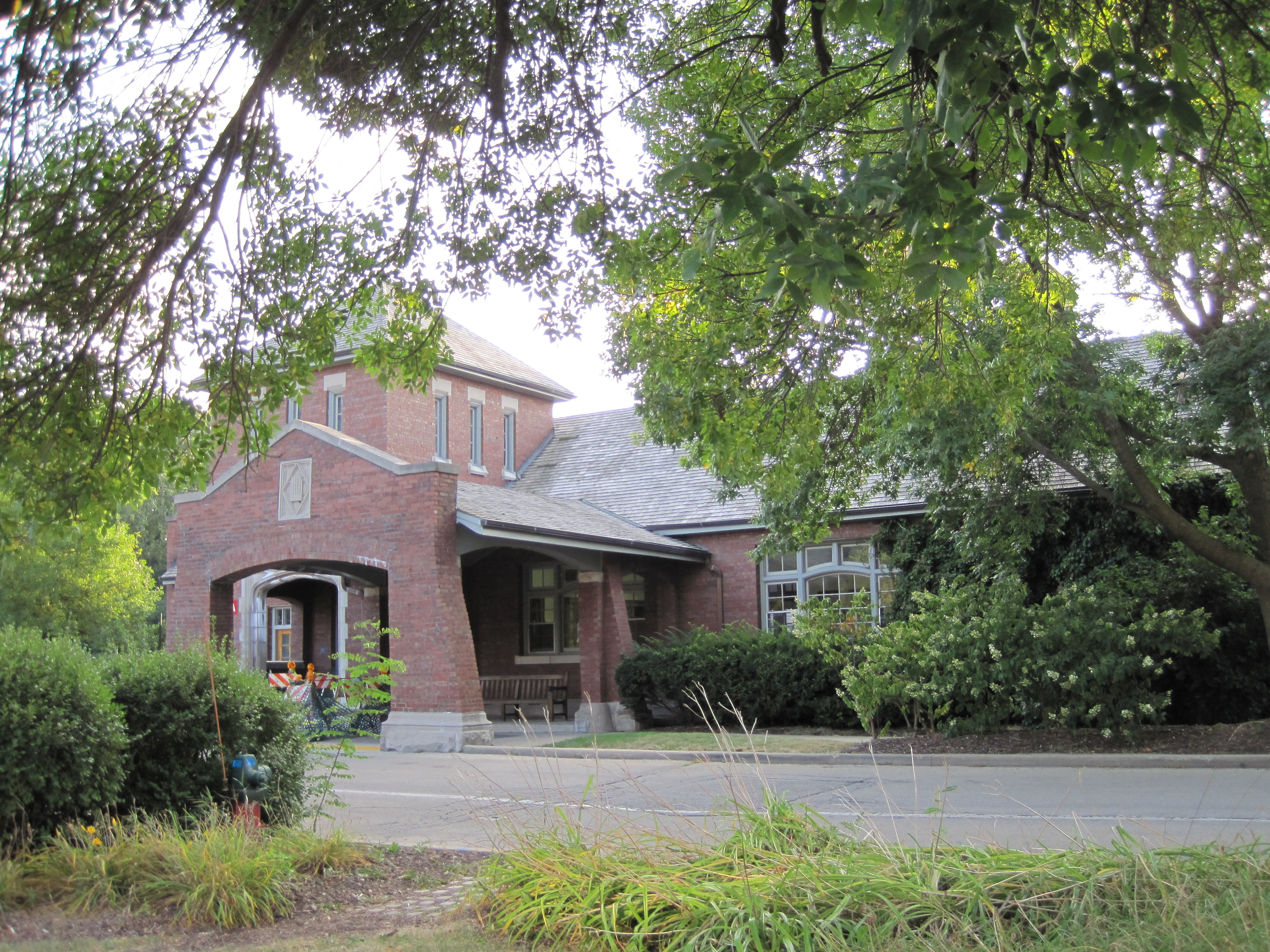
Chicago and North Western Lake Bluff Depot, Chicago, 1904, Frost and Granger

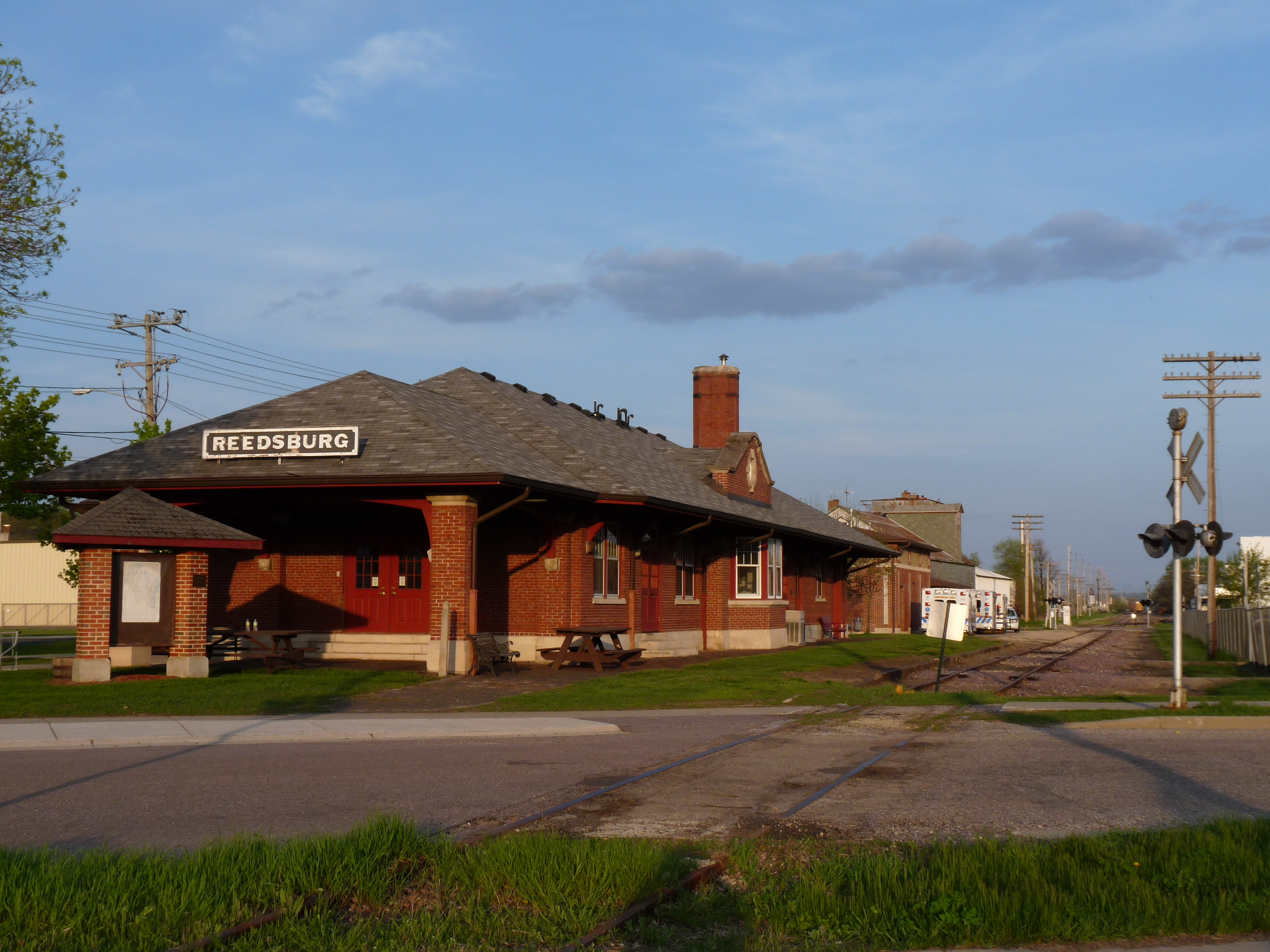
Chicago and North Western Depot, Reedsburg, Wisconsin, 1905, Frost and Granger

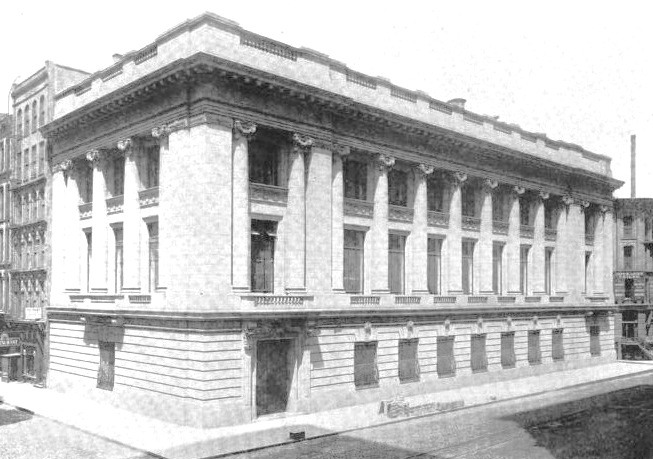
Northern Trust Company Building, Chicago, 1905, Frost and Granger

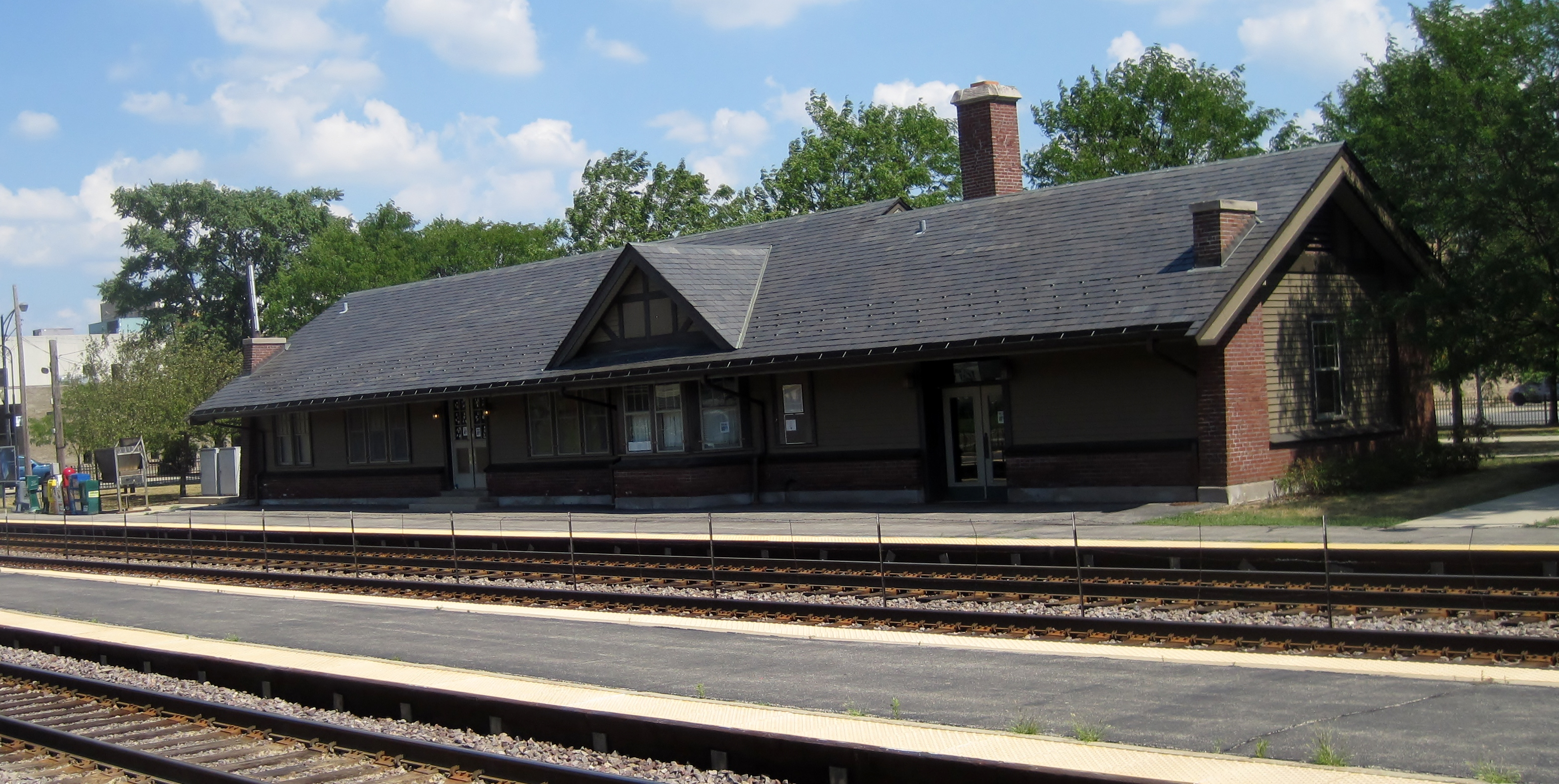
Chicago and North Western Norwood Park Depot, Chicago, 1907, Frost and Granger

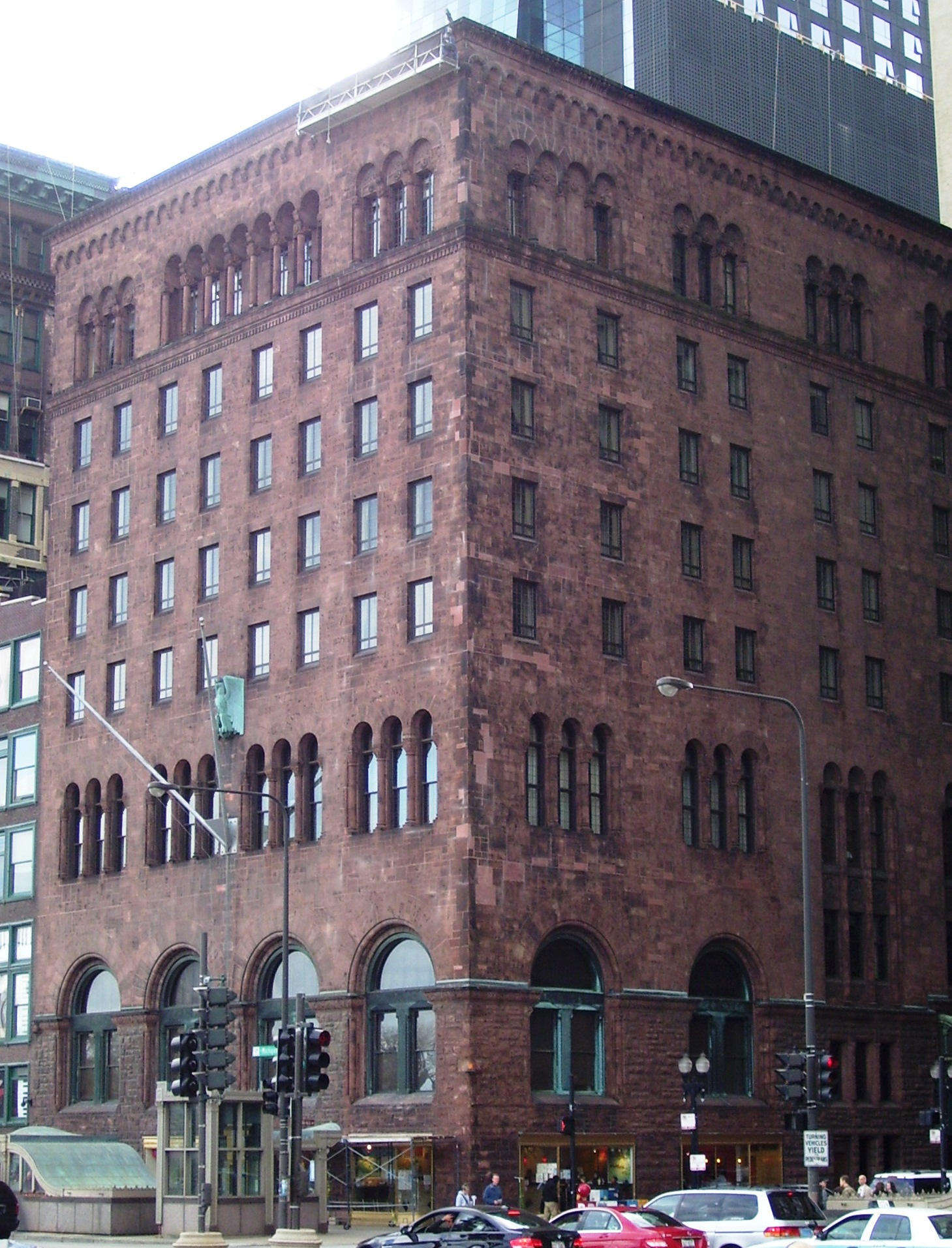
Chicago Club, Chicago, 1929, Granger and Bollenbacher

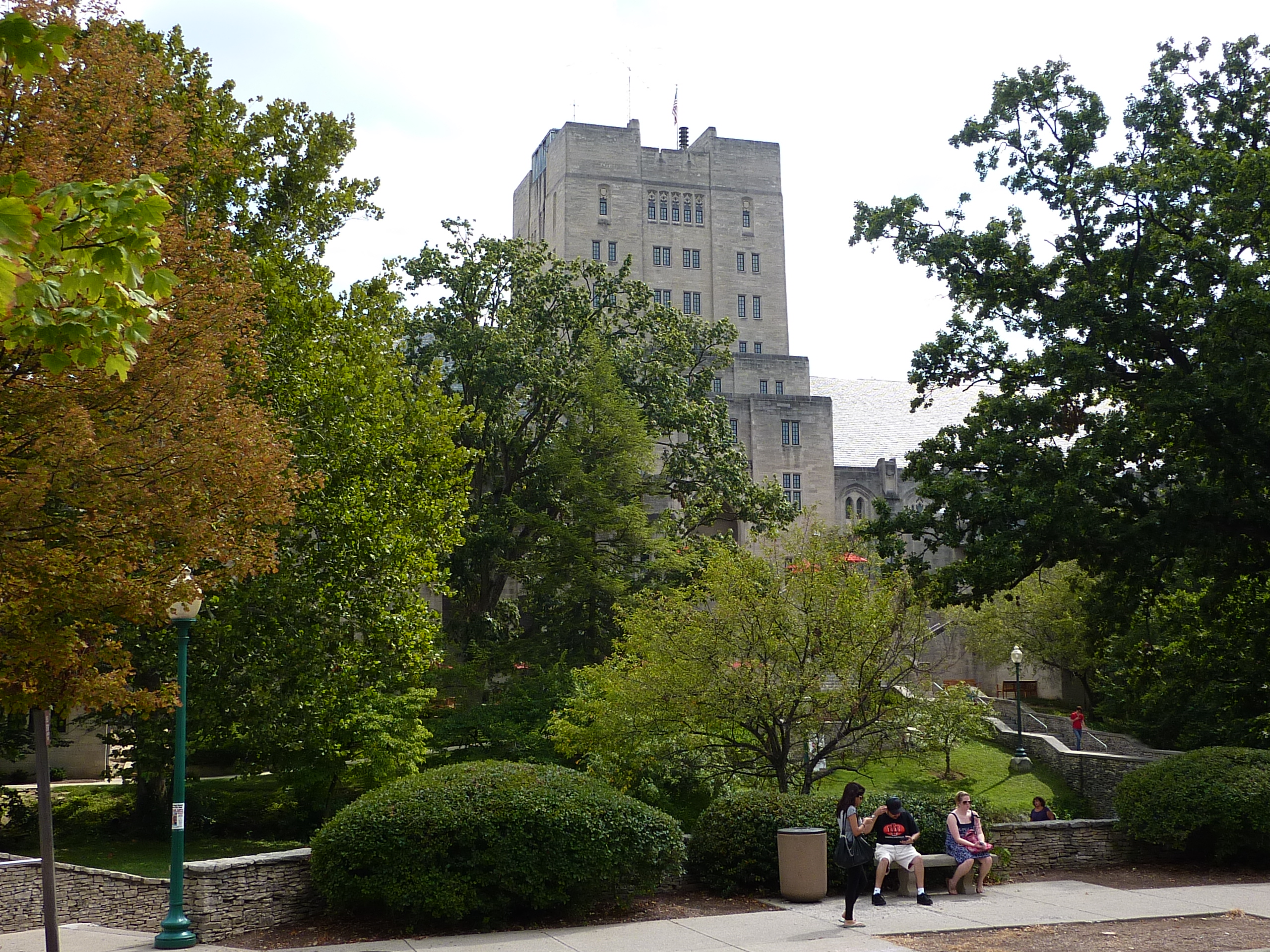
Indiana Memorial Union, Indiana University Campus, Bloomington, Indiana, 1936, Granger and Bollenbacher

== See also ==
- Frost & Granger
