= Frost & Granger =

Architectural partnership

Frost & Granger was an American architectural partnership from 1898 to 1910 of brothers-in-law Charles Sumner Frost (1856–1931) and Alfred Hoyt Granger (1867–1939). Frost and Granger were known for their designs of train stations and terminals, including the now-demolished Chicago and North Western Terminal, in Chicago. The firm designed several residences in Hyde Park, Illinois, and many other buildings. Several of their buildings are listed on the U.S. National Register of Historic Places.

Works (attribution) include:

- Chicago & North Western Station (1898), Wilmette, Illinois, demolished in the 1970s
- Chicago & North Western Station (1898), Ravenswood, Illinois
- Chicago & North Western Station (1899), Clybourn Junction, Illinois
- Chicago and North Western Railway Passenger Depot (1899), 202 Dousman Street, Green Bay, Wisconsin (Frost & Granger), NRHP-listed
- Chicago and North Western Railway station (1899), Western Avenue and Deer Path, Lake Forest, Illinois
- Chicago and North Western Railway passenger station (1899), Highland Park, Illinois
- Chicago, Milwaukee and St. Paul Railway Company Passenger Depot (1900), 127 S. Spring Street, Beaver Dam, Wisconsin (Frost & Granger), NRHP-listed,
- Chicago and North Western Railway Passenger Depot (1901), West Main Street at Clark Avenue, Ames, Iowa
- Racine Depot (1901), 1402 Liberty Street, Racine, Wisconsin (Frost & Granger), NRHP-listed
- Rock Island Lines Passenger Station (1901), 3029 5th Avenue, Rock Island, Illinois (Frost & Granger), NRHP-listed
- Chicago and North Western Railway Passenger Depot (1901), Mount Vernon, Iowa
- Chicago and North Western Railway Passenger Depot (1901), Watertown, South Dakota
- Chicago & North Western Station (1901), Odebolt, Iowa
- Chicago and North Western Railway station (1901), Des Moines, Iowa
- Chicago and North Western Railway Station (1901), Nevada, Iowa
- LaSalle Street Station (1902), Chicago, demolished 1981
- Chicago & Eastern Illinois and Lake Erie & Western Station (1902), Hoopeston, Illinois
- Chicago and North Western Depot (1902), Oak Street NW., Sleepy Eye, Minnesota (Frost & Granger), NRHP-listed
- Chicago, Milwaukee, St Paul & Pacific Station (1902), Wausau, Wisconsin
- Chicago & North Western Station (1902), 2nd Street & Nebraska Street, Sioux City, IA, demolished in 1962.
- Chicago and North Western Depot (1902), 220 Lynn St, Baraboo, Wisconsin, NRHP-listed
- West Madison Depot, Chicago, Milwaukee, and St. Paul Railway (1903), 640 W. Washington Avenue, Madison, Wisconsin (Frost & Granger), NRHP-listed
- Chicago and North Western office building, 226 West Jackson Boulevard at Franklin Street, Chicago (1904)
- Chicago & North Western Station (1904), Lake Bluff, Illinois
- Hilton House Hotel (1904), Beloit, Wisconsin
- Chicago and North Western Railway station at Kedzie Avenue (1904), Chicago, Illinois
- Northern Trust Company Building, 50 South LaSalle Street, Chicago, (1905)
- Chicago & North Western Station (1905), Valentine, Nebraska
- Chicago & North Western Station (1902), Zion City, Illinois
- Chicago & North Western Freight Station (1906), Omaha, Nebraska
- Chicago and North Western Depot (1906), Railroad Street, Reedsburg, Wisconsin (Frost & Granger), NRHP-listed
- Chicago and North Western Railway Station (1906), Lander, Wyoming
- Chicago and North Western Railway Station (1906), Ishpeming, Michigan
- Antigo Depot (1907), 522 Morse Street, Antigo, Wisconsin (Frost & Granger), NRHP-listed
- Chicago and North Western Railway station (1907), Main Street east of 1st Street, Breda, Iowa, to standard plan "Combination Depot No. 2" drawn by Frost & Granger (1899)
- Chicago & North Western Depot (1907), Norwood Park, Illinois
- Chicago and North Western Railway station (1907), Norfolk, Nebraska
- Chicago & North Western Station (1909), McHenry, Illinois
- Chicago & North Western Station (1910), Madison, Wisconsin.
- Chicago & North Western Station (1910), Harvard, Illinois
- Three Chicago & North Western Interlocking Towers (1910), Chicago, Illinois
- Chicago & North Western Station (1910), Evanston, Illinois
- Chicago & North Western Station (1910), Aberdeen, South Dakota
- Chicago & North Western Station (1910), Wheaton, Illinois
- Chicago and North Western Railway station (1910), Braeside, Illinois
- Chicago and North Western Terminal (1911), Chicago, demolished 1984
- Chicago and North Western Railway Powerhouse (1911), 211 North Clinton St, Chicago
- Chicago and Northwestern Depot (1914), U.S. 212, Redfield, South Dakota (Frost & Granger), NRHP-listed

== Gallery ==
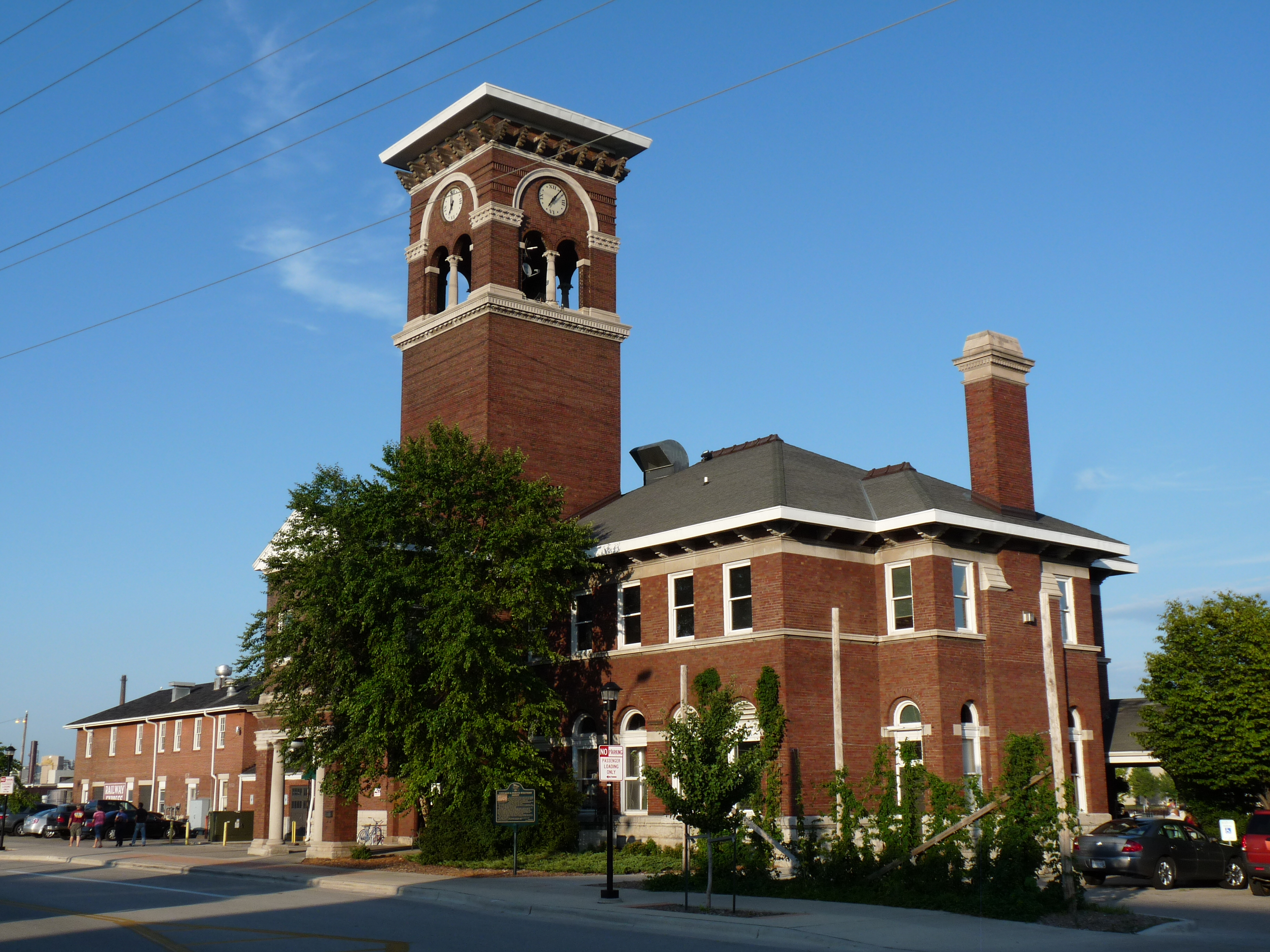
Chicago & North Western Depot, Green Bay, Wisconsin (1899)

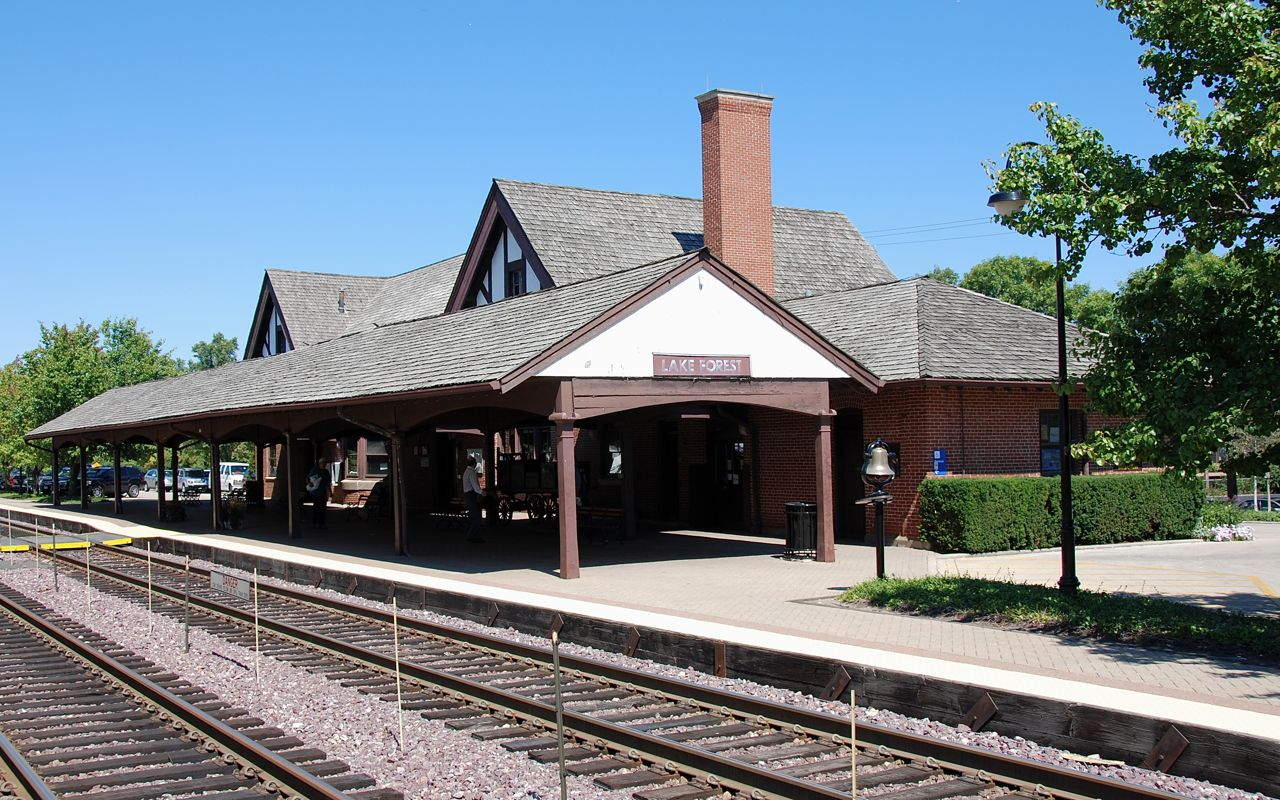
Chicago & North Western Depot, Lake Forest, Illinois (1899)

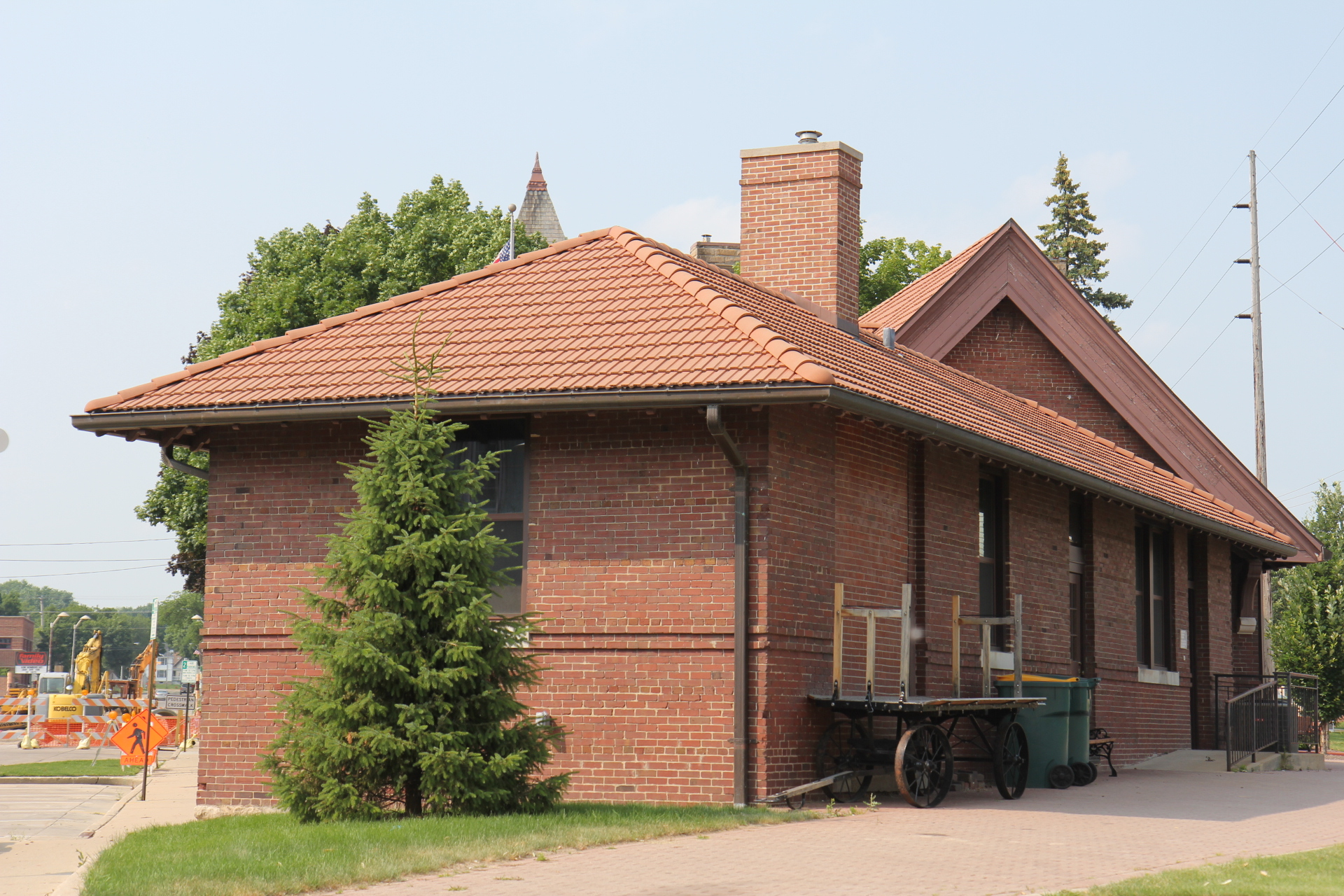
Chicago, Milwaukee & St. Paul Depot, Beaver Dam, Wisconsin (1901)

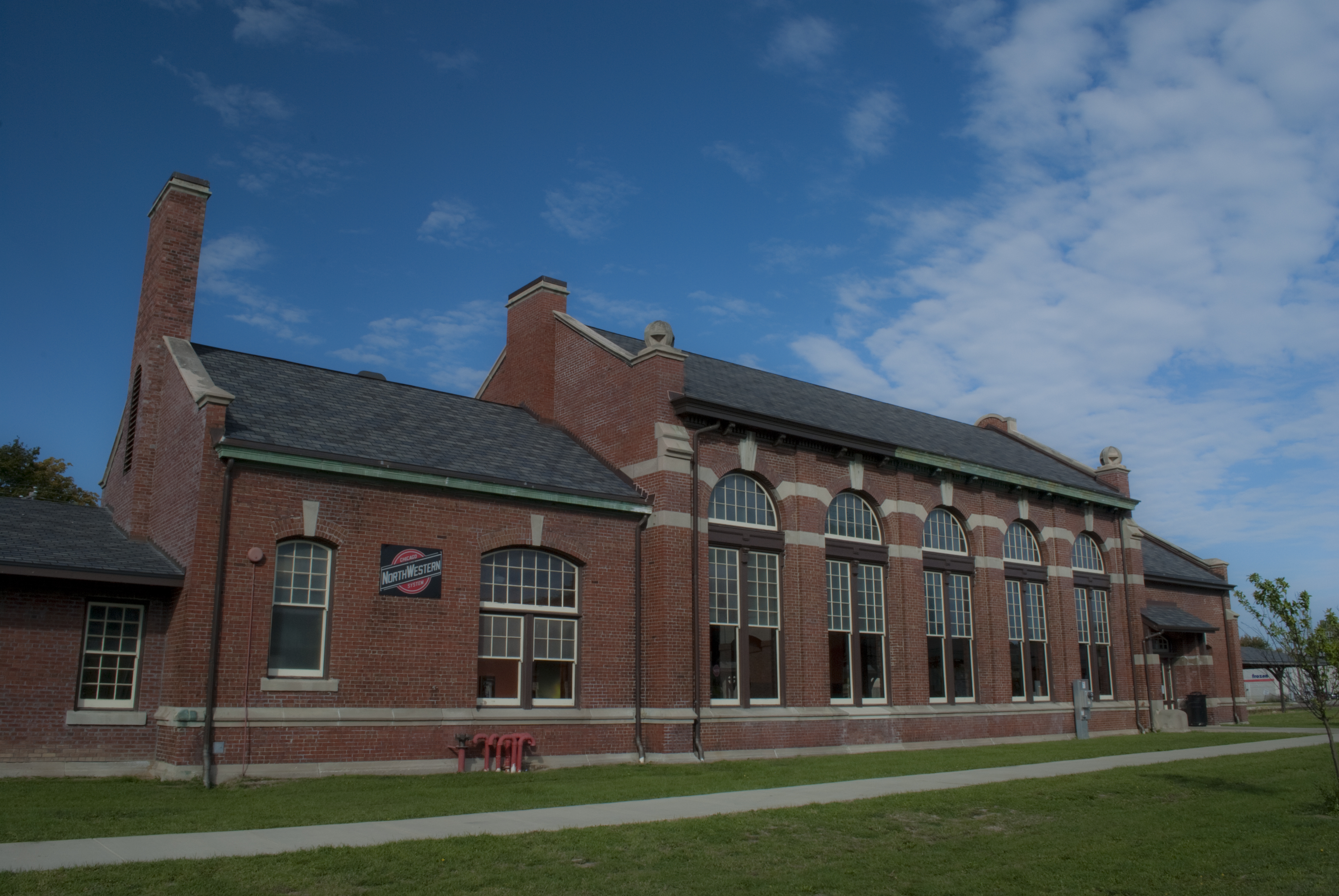
Chicago & North Western Depot, Racine, Wisconsin (1901)

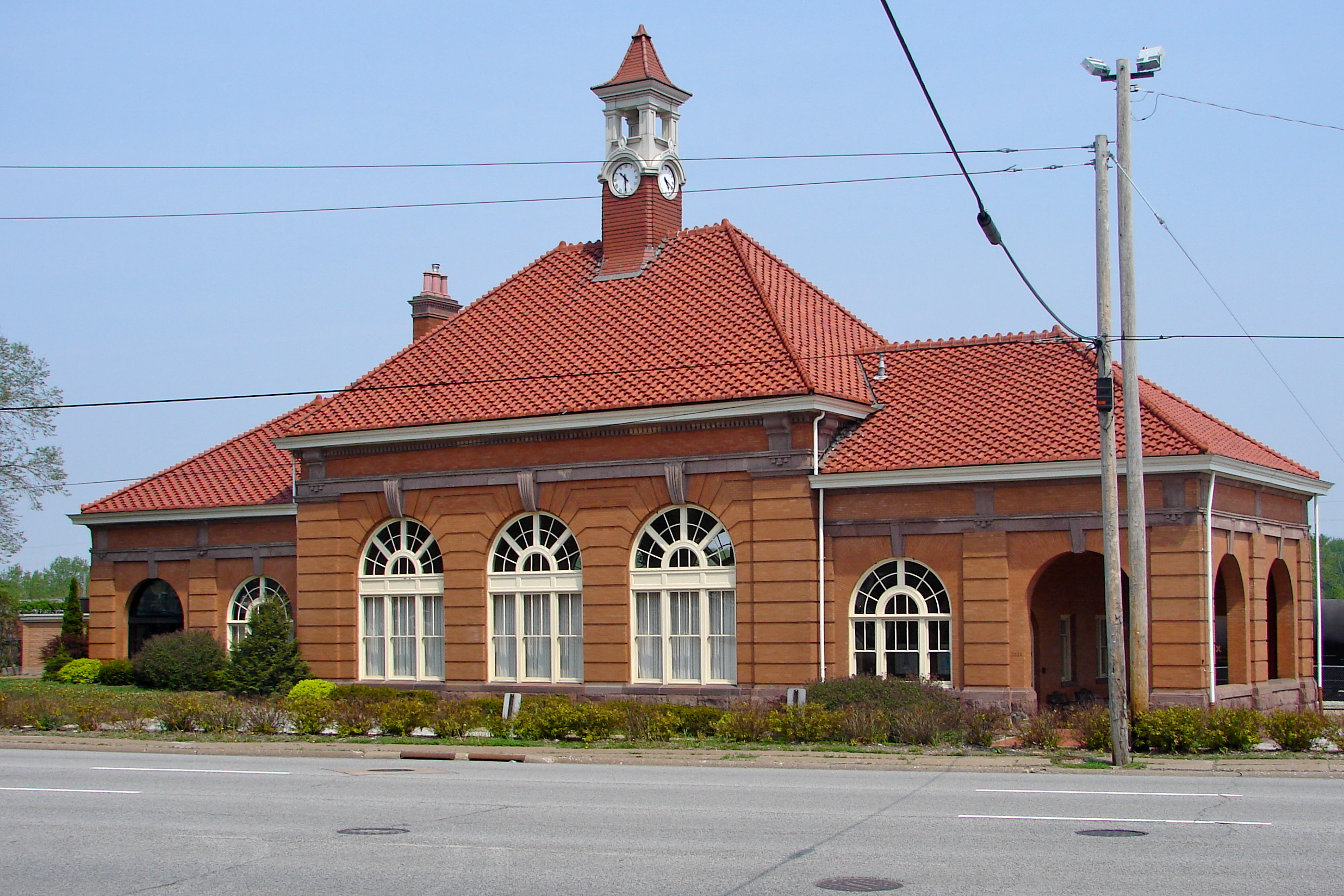
Rock Island Lines Station, Rock Island, Illinois (1901)

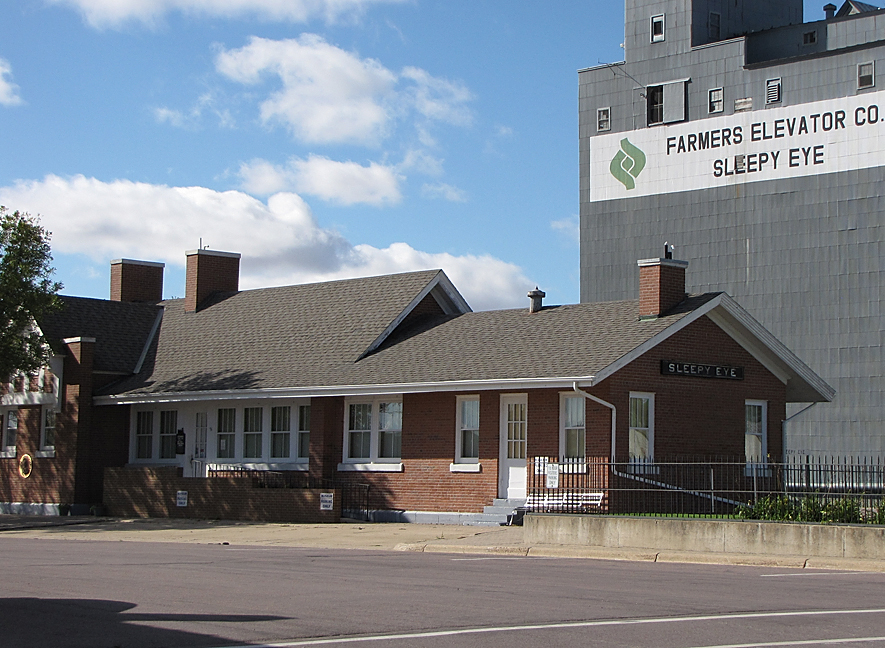
Chicago & North Western Depot, Sleepy Eye, Minnesota (1902)

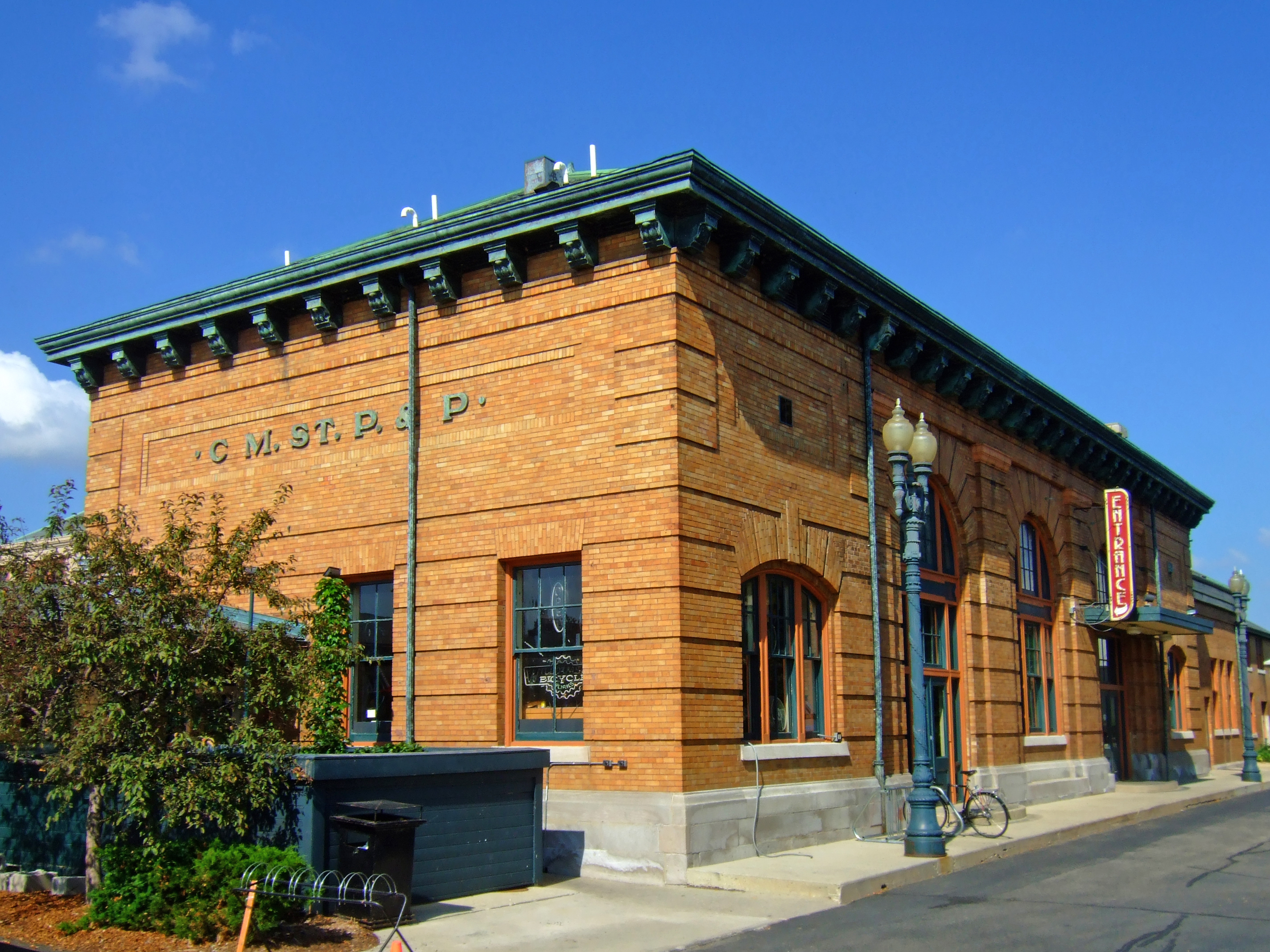
Chicago, Milwaukee & St. Paul Depot, West Madison, Wisconsin (1903)

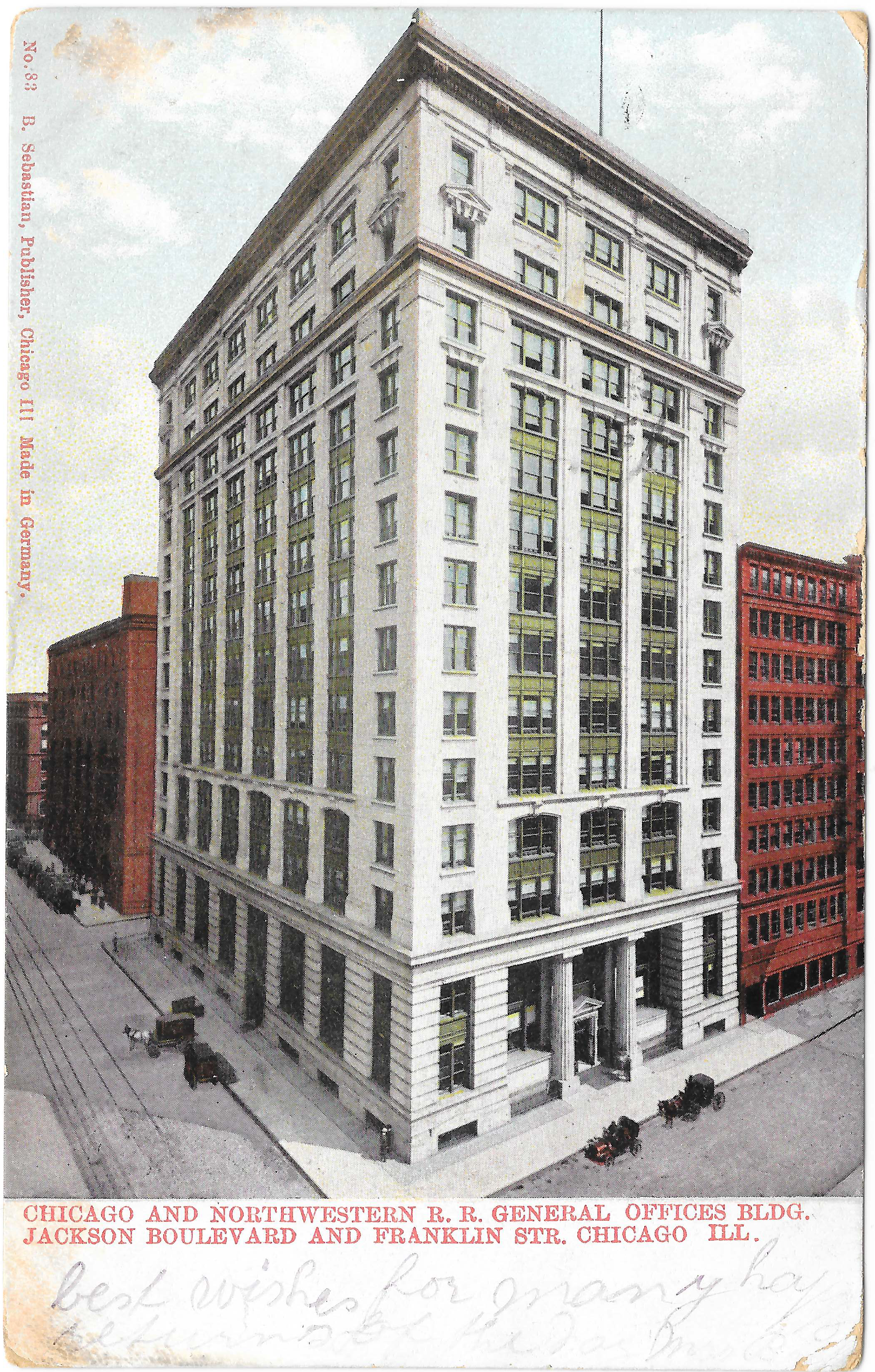
Chicago & North Western office building, Chicago, Illinois (1904)

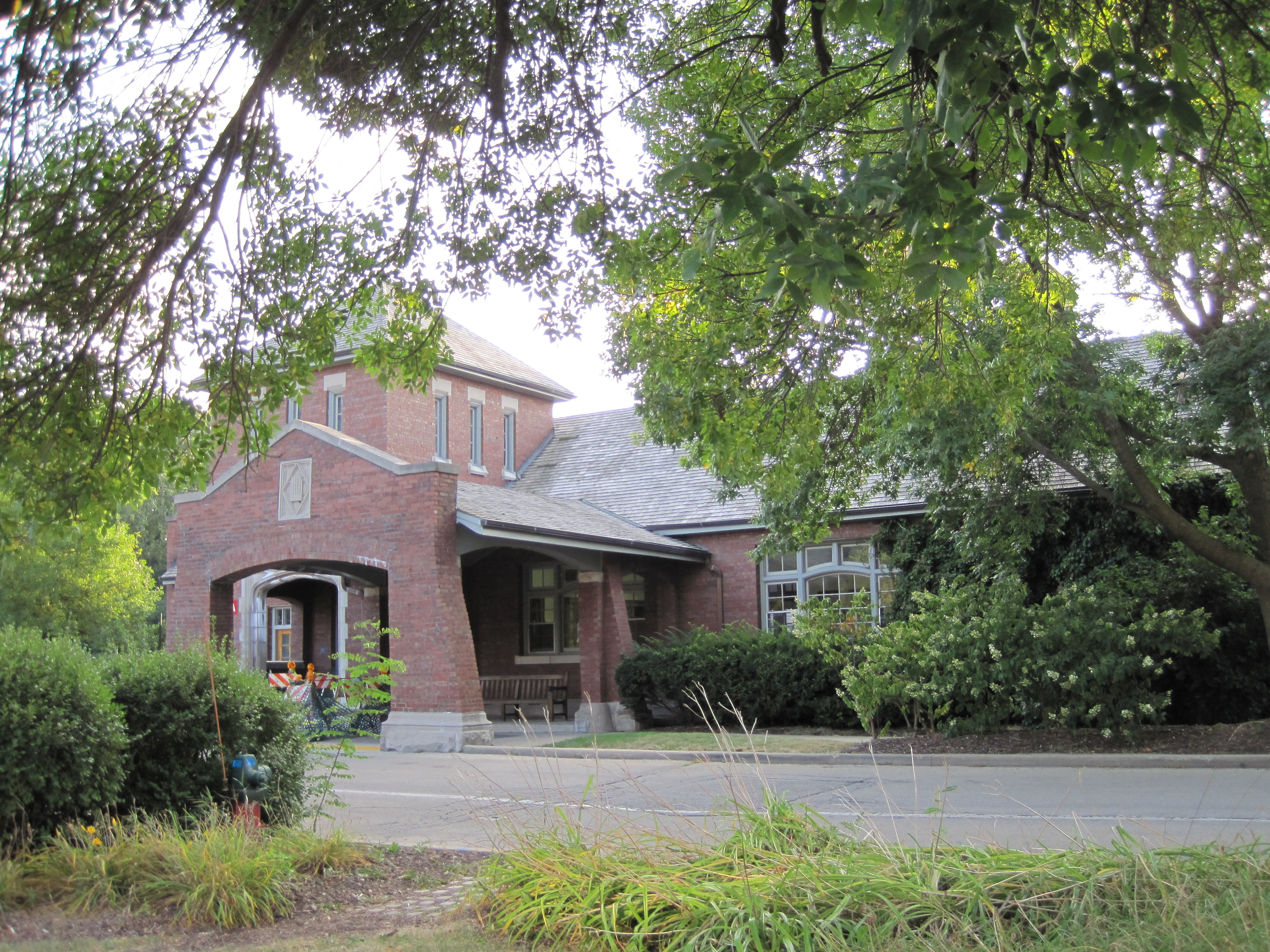
Chicago & North Western Lake Bluff Depot, Chicago (1904)

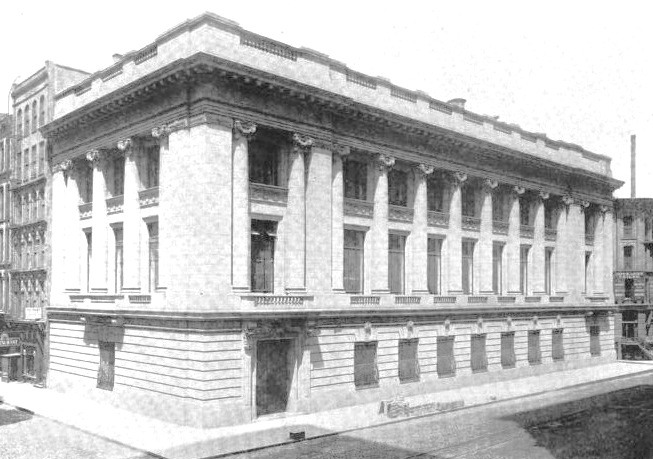
Northern Trust Company Building, Chicago, (1905)

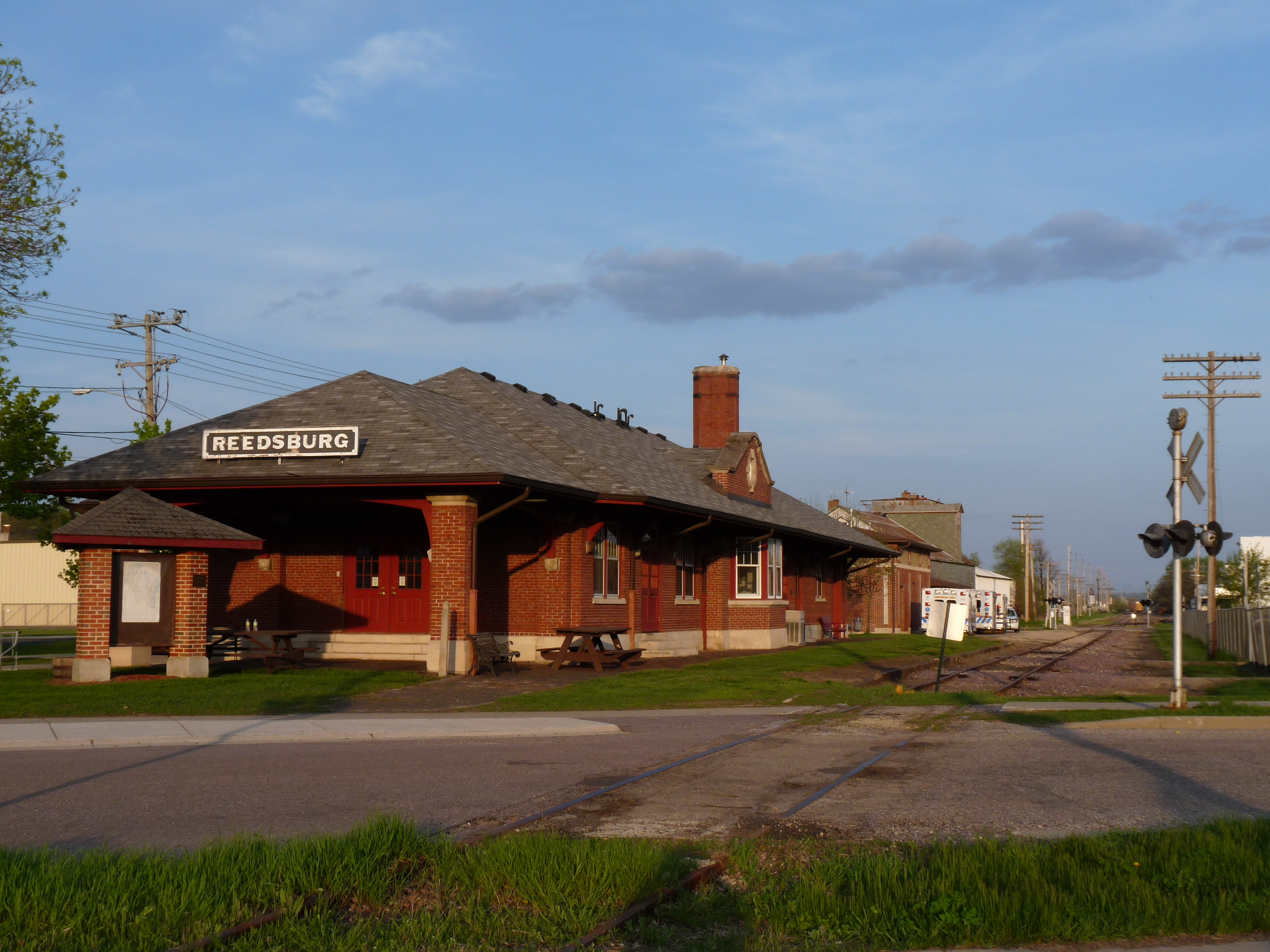
Chicago & North Western Depot, Reedsburg, Wisconsin (1906)

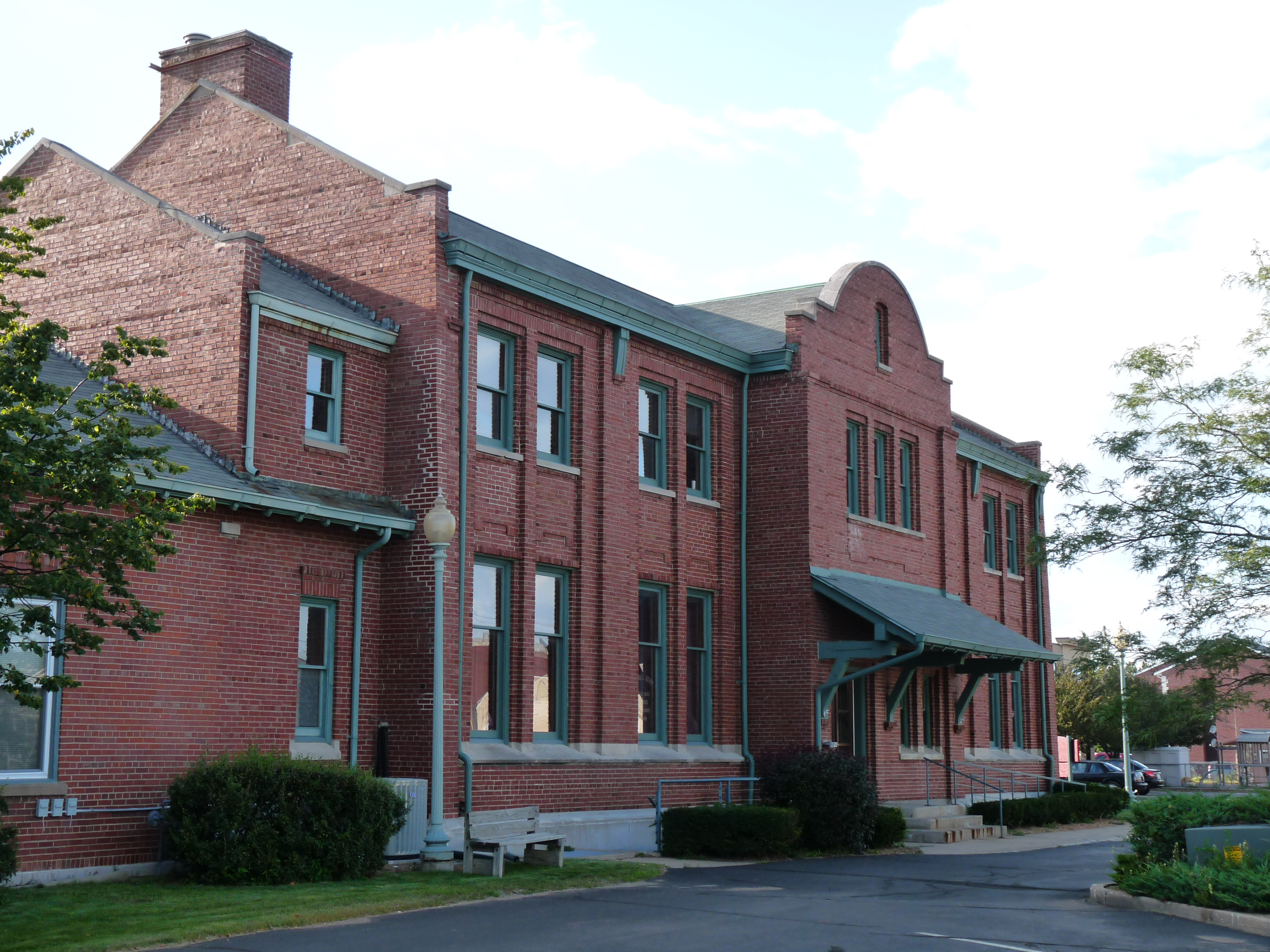
Chicago & North Western Depot, Antigo, Wisconsin (1907)

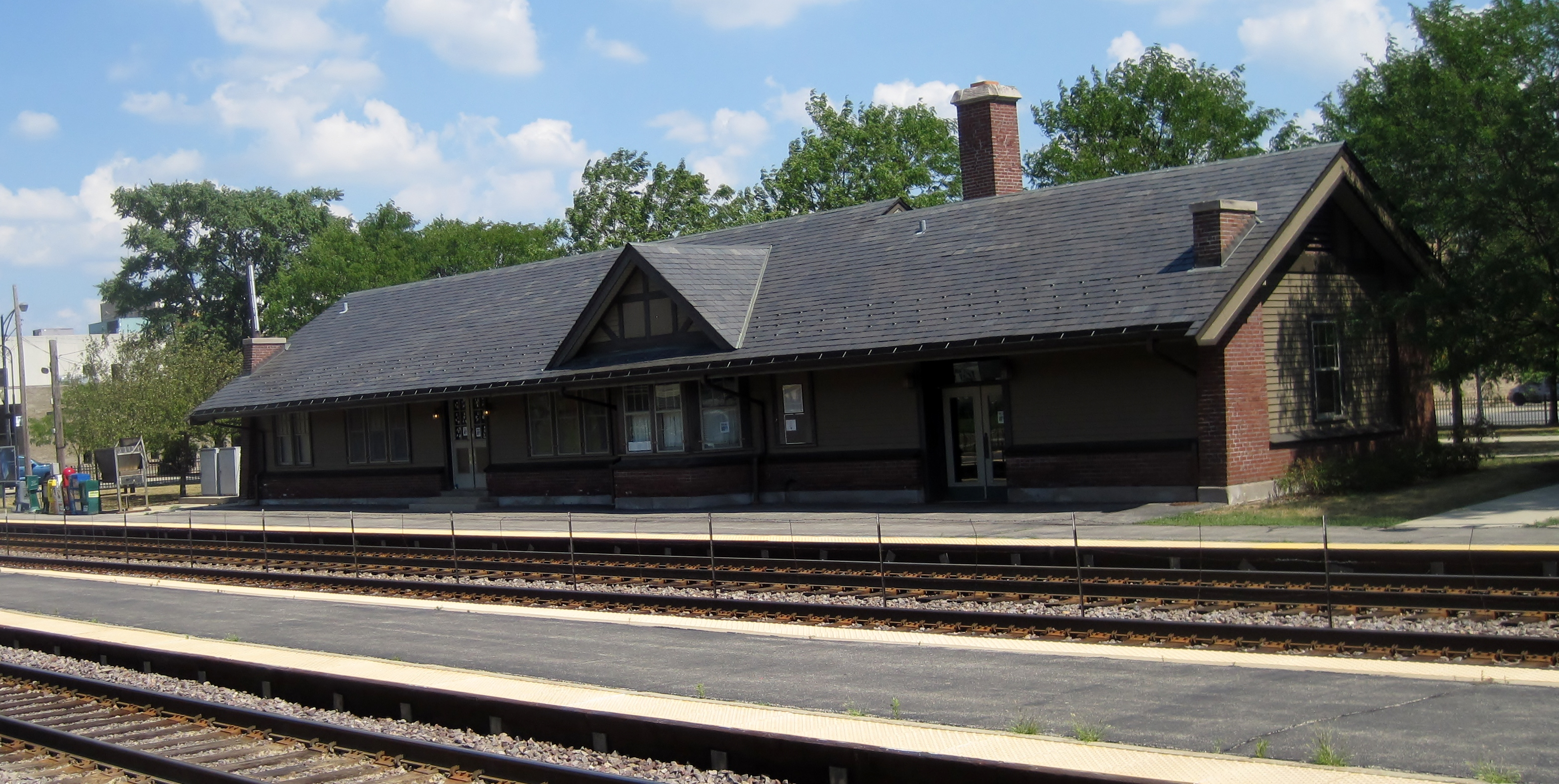
Chicago & North Western Norwood Park Depot, Chicago (1907)

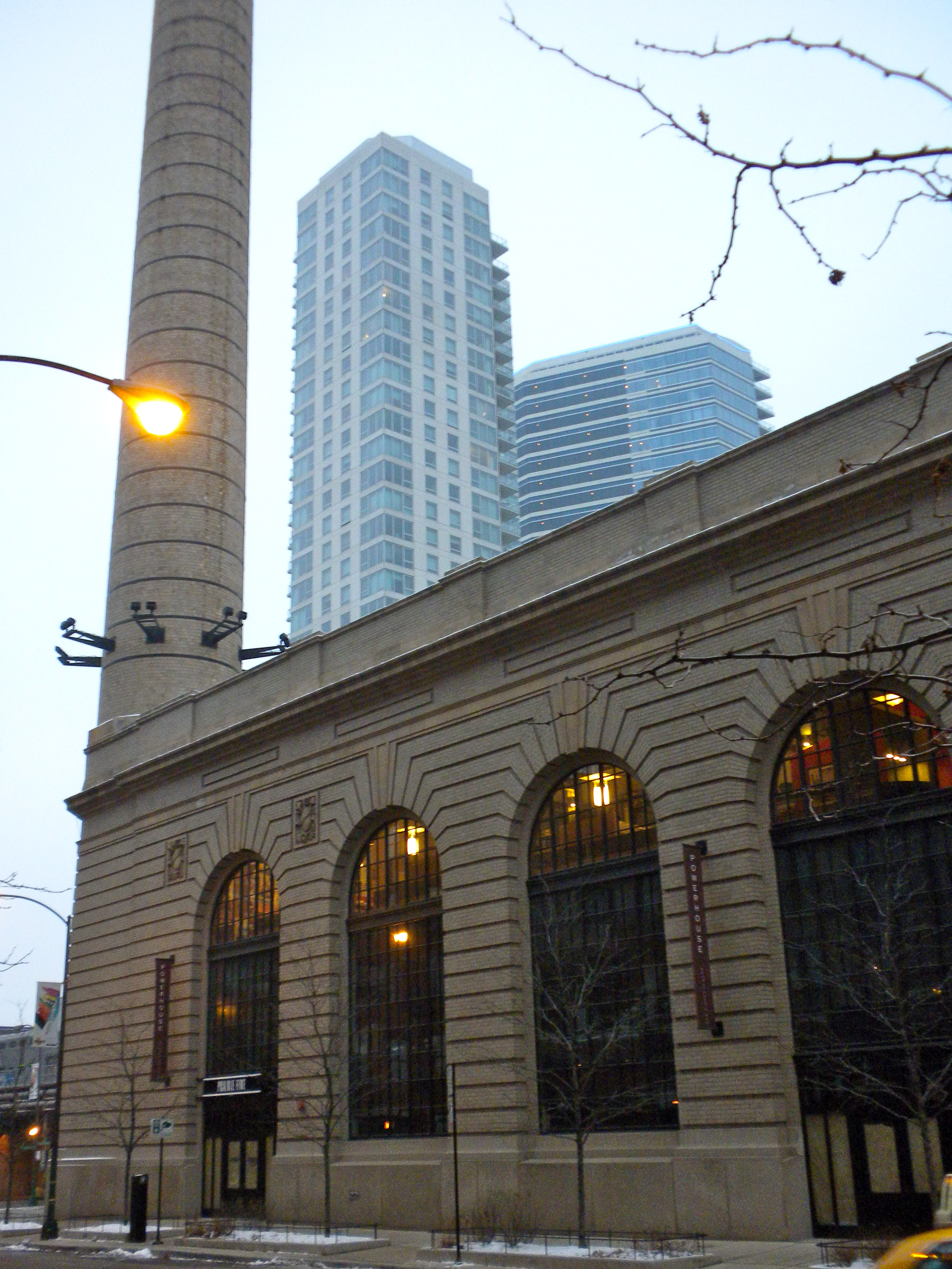
Chicago & North Western Powerhouse, Chicago (1911)

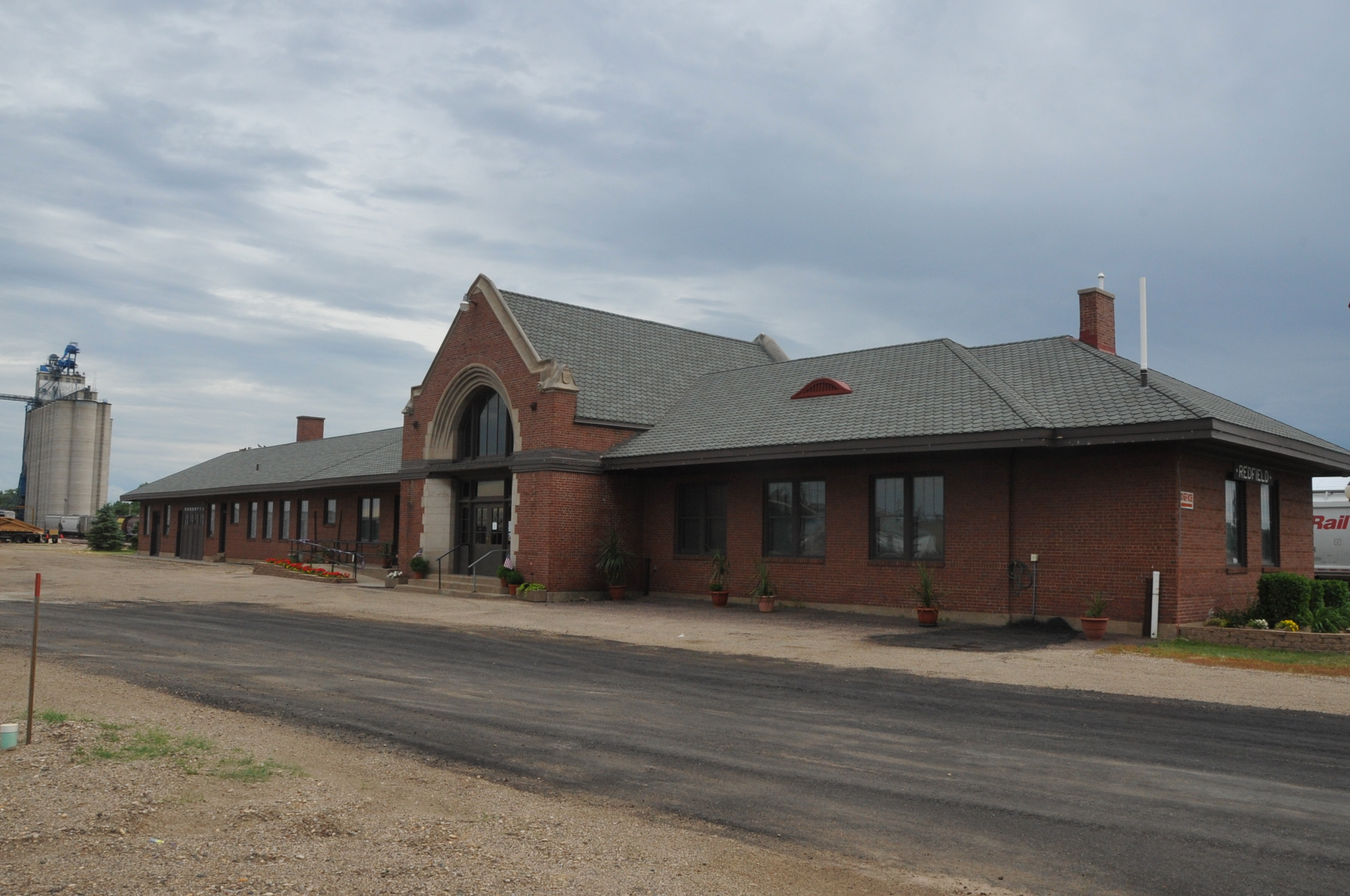
Chicago & North Western Depot, Redfield, South Dakota (1914)
