= Chicago Club =

- U.S. National Register of Historic Places
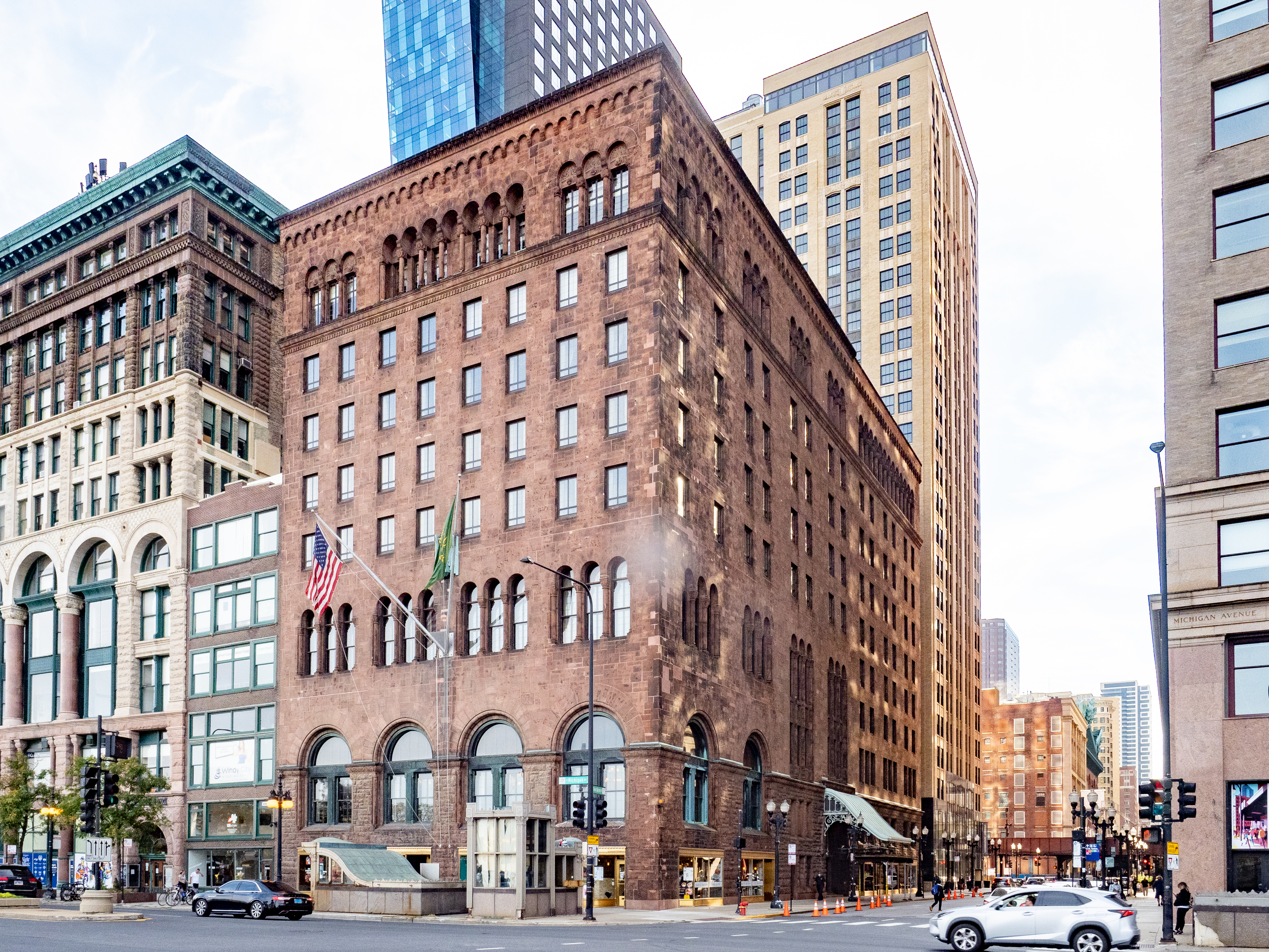

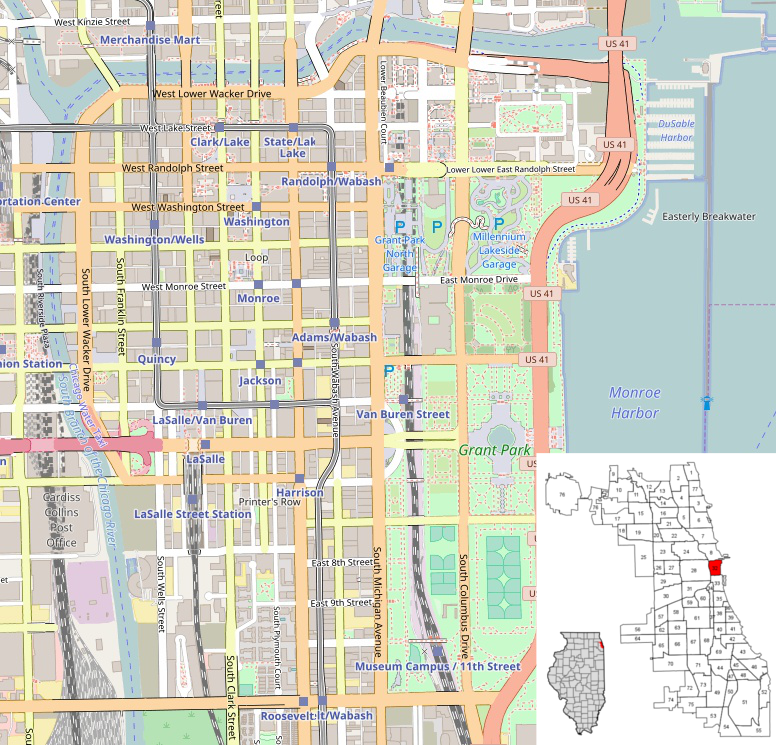
- Location within Chicago Loop
- Location: Chicago, Illinois
- Coordinates: 41°52′36.94″N 87°37′28.73″W
- Built: 1929
- Architect: Alfred Hoyt Granger and John Carlisle Bollenbacher
- Architectural style: Romanesque
- NRHP reference No.: 05000109
- Added to NRHP: February 28, 2005

The Chicago Club, founded in 1869, is a private social club located at 81 East Van Buren Street at Michigan Avenue in the Loop neighborhood of Chicago, Illinois, in the United States. Its membership has included many of Chicago's most prominent businessmen, politicians, and families.

== History ==
In the mid-1860s, a social group formed in Chicago, Illinois, that met on State Street. The group later met on the top floor of the old Portland Block on the southeast corner of Dearborn and Washington streets. Known as the Dearborn Club, members would meet in afternoons to drink and play cards. Members included Western Union co-founder Anson Stager, former New York State Senator Henry R. Pierson, Judge of the Cook County Court Hugh T. Dickey, President of the American Banker's Association Frank C. Rathje and dry goods merchant Philip Wadsworth. The Dearborn Club was shut down by the Cook County Sheriff's Office in 1868.

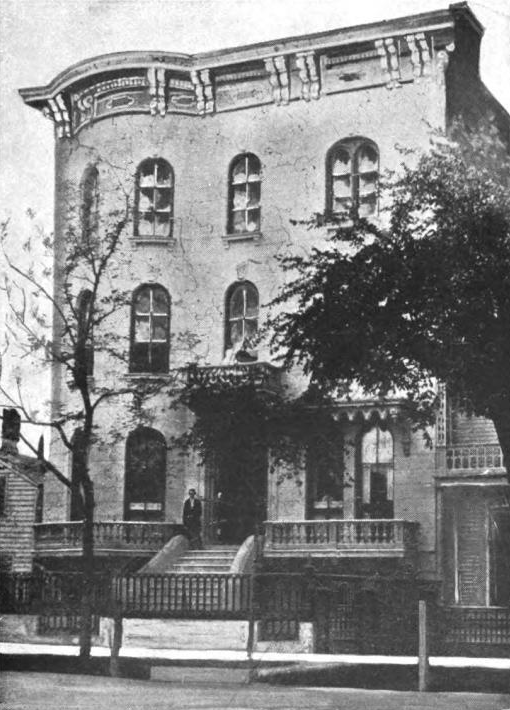
The first home of the Chicago Club, the Farnam mansion on Michigan Avenue

In January 1869, former members of the Dearborn Club organized a meeting in the Sherman House. Although nothing was decided, a second meeting was scheduled, and there a resolution was passed to create a new club for 100 Chicago citizens. For $100, a gentleman could join the Chicago Club. Wadsworth was elected the first president. Stager, Charles B. Farwell, George Pullman, George & David Gage, and Wirt Dexter each lent the club $500 to cover early expenses. Other charter members included Robert Todd Lincoln, the President's son, Perry H. Smith, the railroad magnate, Potter Palmer, and (later) Marshall Field. Former state representative Edward S. Isham drafted incorporation papers and Wadsworth delivered them to the state capitol of Springfield. The club then rented the former Henry Farnam mansion on the corner of Michigan Avenue between Jackson and Adams Streets. The first meeting of the Chicago Club was held on May 1, 1869.

The first clubhouse was destroyed by fire in the Great Chicago Fire of 1871, so the club moved to 279 Michigan Avenue for two years, and then to the Gregg House at 476 Wabash Avenue. In 1876 the club built its first permanent home on Monroe Street across from the Palmer House.

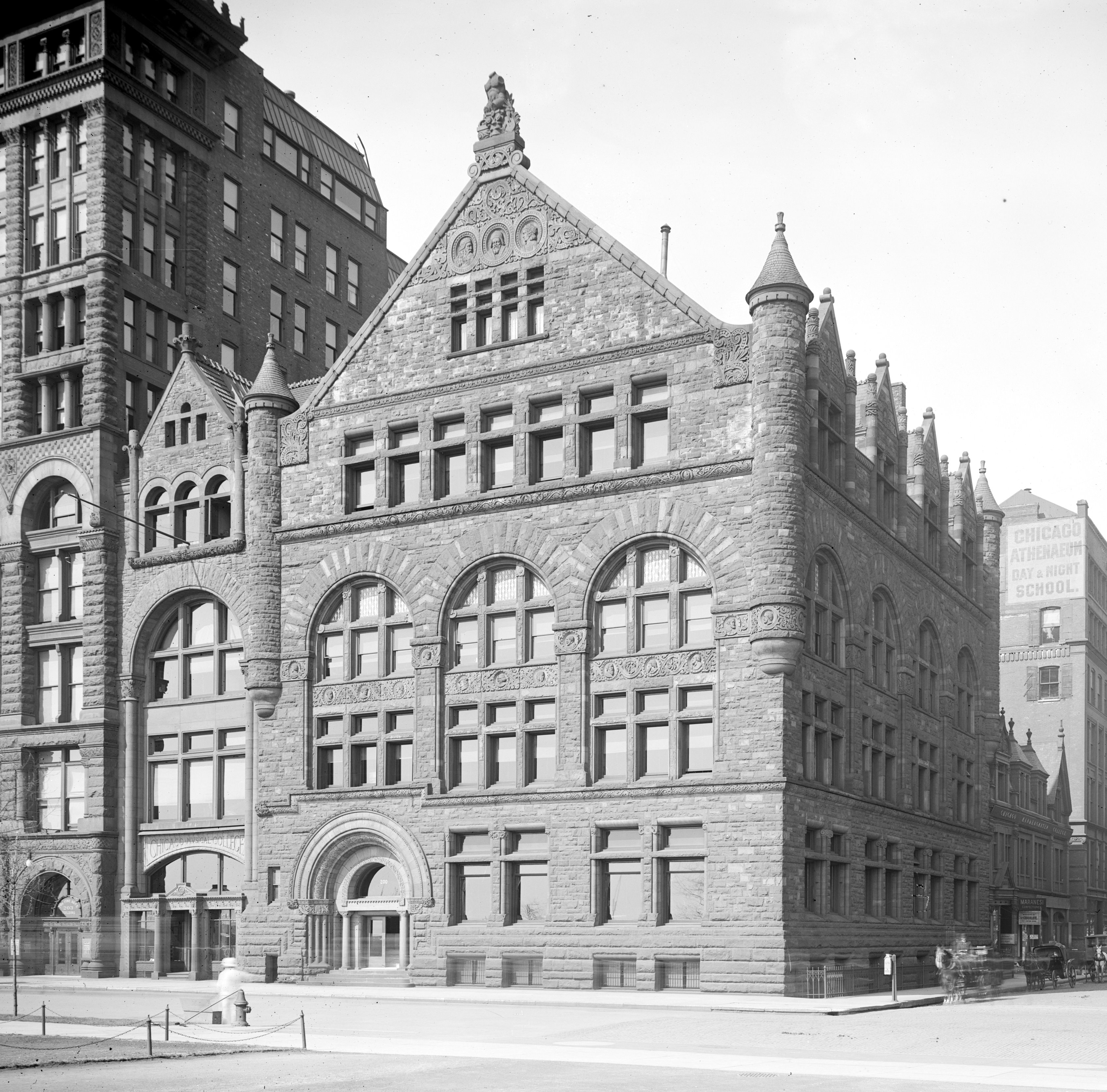
The Burnham & Root-designed building, originally constructed for the Art Institute of Chicago, which became the Club's headquarters from 1893-c.1928

In 1893, the club decided it needed larger quarters, and it purchased from the Art Institute of Chicago its former building on the corner of Michigan Avenue and Van Buren Street. This building has been put up in 1886-1887 and was designed by Burnham and Root to be the first home of the Institute, which moved across the street to its current location in 1892. This building remained the clubhouse until the 1920s, when it collapsed during remodelling.

To replace it, Granger and Bollenbacher designed an eight-story granite building in the Romanesque Revival style, which was completed in 1929. During construction, Burnham & Root's triple-arched entrance was moved around the corner from Michigan Avenue to Van Buren Street, where it remains the main entrance to the building, which was listed on the National Register of Historic Places in 2005, and continues as the club's headquarters today.

== Privacy ==
The Chicago Club's by-laws specifically forbid working members of the press from entering the building. The one exception to this rule seems to have been in 1982 when a Chicago Tribune editor was able to obtain limited access.

[T]he interior splendor of the Chicago Club is as private as a stately home in England, which it much resembles in décor. Indeed, few pedestrians passing by the eight-story red-granite clubhouse at Van Buren and Michigan even know what the place is. Club members – with such names as Field, Pullman, Lincoln, McCormick, and Blair – may have shaped Chicago history. But they also have developed a sense of privacy that politely but firmly excludes: 1) The entire world, except for the club's 1,200 carefully selected members; 2) Until recently, women; and 3) Reporters and photographers. "We'll fight to the death on that one," growls one club board member ...

How do you get in? Don't ask. How tough is it to join? In a word, very. Not only is there a long waiting list, but an applicant needs a sponsoring member, a seconder, lots of letters of support, and a good deal of patience. Most applicants test the waters first, so formal rejections are few. But not even the well-connected can breeze in ...

Historians might argue that the Chicago Club no longer has the power it wielded in the days when its "millionaires' table" was the lunchtime gathering place of Marshall Field, George Pullman, N. K. Fairbank, John Crerar, and a half-dozen others, each worth millions in the days when that sum meant something. "Everything to be done in Chicago was discussed by that group, and then word was passed out", as Stanley Field put it. ... But a visitor, seated on a lobby sofa, and those who sweep in for lunch, could hardly disagree with the recent pecking-order manual, "Who Runs Chicago?" Its conclusion: "The Chicago Club is the center of power in Chicago. It is mandatory for the city's biggest executives to join it, unless they want to be considered not-so-big executives.

== University of California "Centrality Study" ==
In 1975, G. William Domhoff, professor of sociology at the University of California, ran a network analysis study on the membership of think tanks, policy-planning groups, social clubs, trade associations, and opinion-shaping groups across the country for a research project he was doing on San Francisco's Bohemian Club. The Bohemian Club turned out to be the 11th "most connected" organization in the country. Only three social clubs ranked higher: New York's Links Club (3rd), San Francisco's Pacific Union (7th), and The Chicago Club (8th).

Name of Organization	Type of Organization	Centrality Score (0-1)
1. Business Council	Policy-planning group	.95
2. Committee for Economic Development	Policy-planning group	.91
3. Links Club (NY)	Social club	.80
4. Conference Board	Policy-planning group	.77
5. Advertising Council	Opinion-shaping group	.73
6. Council on Foreign Relations	Policy-planning group	.68
7. Pacific Union (SF)	Social club	.67
8. Chicago Club (Chicago)	Social club	.65
9. Brookings Institution	Think Tank	.65
10. American Assembly	Policy-planning group	.65
11. Bohemian Club (SF)	Social Club	.62
12. Century Association (NY)	Social club	.48
13. California Club (LA)	Social club	.46
14. Foundation for American Agriculture	Think tank	.45
15. Detroit Club (Detroit)	Social club	.44
16. National Planning Association	Policy-planning group	.36
17. Eagle Lake (Houston)	Social club	.33
18. National Municipal League	Policy-planning	.33
19. Somerset Club (Boston)	Social club	.32
20. Rancheros Vistadores (Santa Barbara)	Social club	.26

== See also ==
- List of American gentlemen's clubs
