= Chicago and North Western Railway Power House =

Power house in Chicago, Illinois

- U.S. National Register of Historic Places
- Chicago Landmark
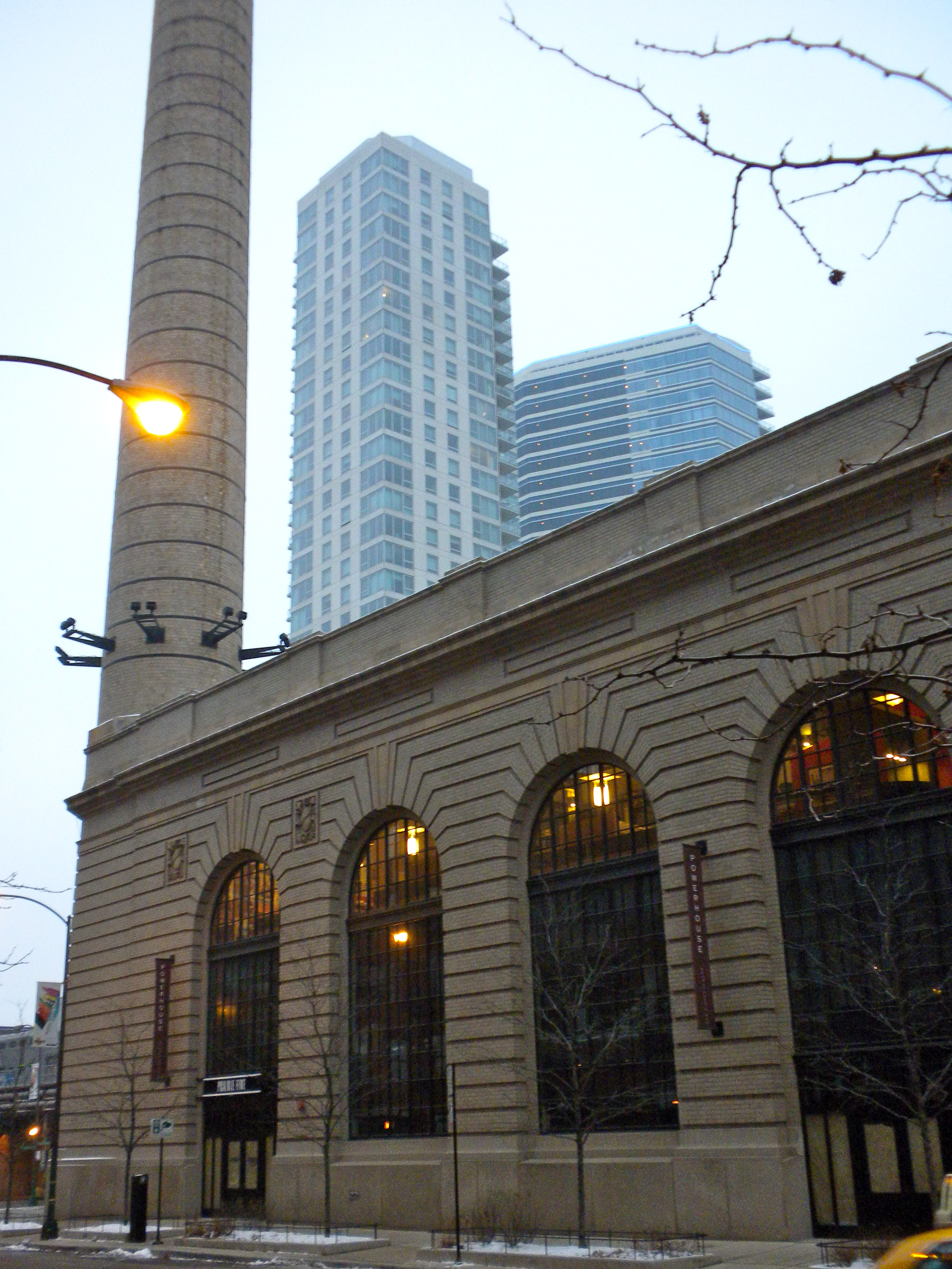

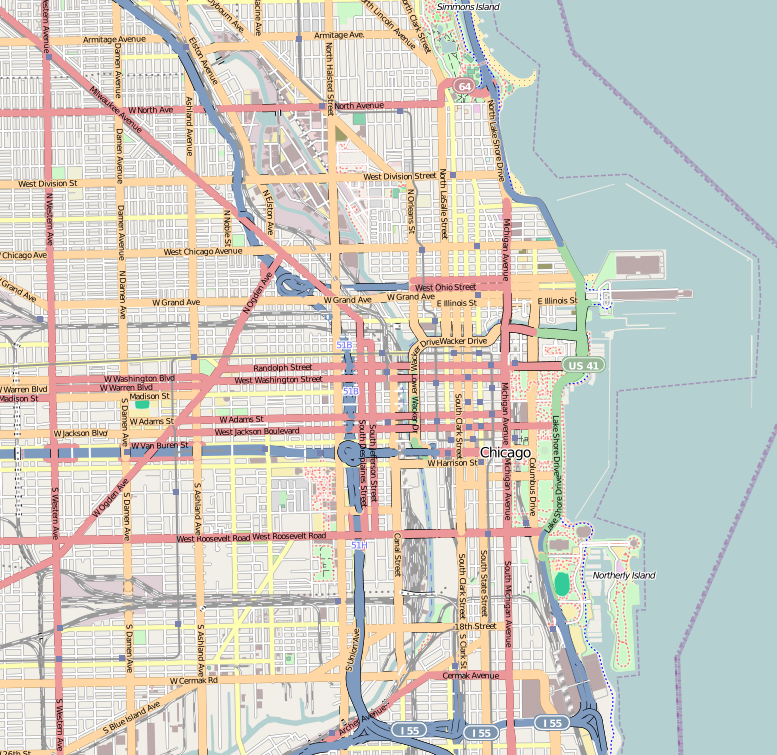
- Location within Central Chicago Location within Illinois Location within the United States
- Location: 211 N. Clinton St., Chicago, Illinois
- Coordinates: 41.886285°N 87.641085°W
- Area: less than one acre
- Built: 1911
- Architect: Frost & Granger
- Architectural style: Beaux Arts, Renaissance
- NRHP reference No.: 04001306

Significant dates
- Added to NRHP: December 10, 2004
- Designated CHICL: January 11, 2006

The Chicago and North Western Railway Power House is the historic power house which served the 1911 Chicago and North Western Terminal in Chicago, Illinois. The building was designed by Frost & Granger in 1909; it was mainly designed in the Beaux Arts style but also exhibits elements of the Italian Renaissance Revival style. Construction on the building finished in 1911, the same year the terminal opened. The irregularly shaped building borders Clinton Street, Milwaukee Avenue, Lake Street, and the former Chicago and North Western tracks, which are now used by Metra for its Union Pacific District. The power house was built in cream brick with terra cotta trim, cornices, and ornamentation; the corner of the house at Clinton and Milwaukee features a 227-foot (69 m) brick smokestack. The building contained four rooms, a large engine room and boiler room and a smaller engineer's office and reception room. The Chicago Tribune reported in 1948 that the power house output enough power to serve a city of 15,000 people. The power house ceased to serve the station in the 1960s, but when the terminal was demolished and replaced by Ogilvie Transportation Center in 1984, the power house survived. It is one of two remaining railroad power houses in Chicago and the only remaining power house for the Chicago and North Western.

The power house was added to the National Register of Historic Places on December 10, 2004. It was designated as a Chicago Landmark on January 11, 2006.

Prior to its designation as a landmark, the building had long been slated for demolition, and its sub-basements were damaged by the 1992 Chicago Flood. A real estate developer purchased the building and, by adding two additional interior floors, re-developed the structure into a mixed-use office and retail building. The renovations won the Best Adaptive Reuse award from Landmarks Illinois in 2007.
