= Antigo station =

Historic rail station

Antigo
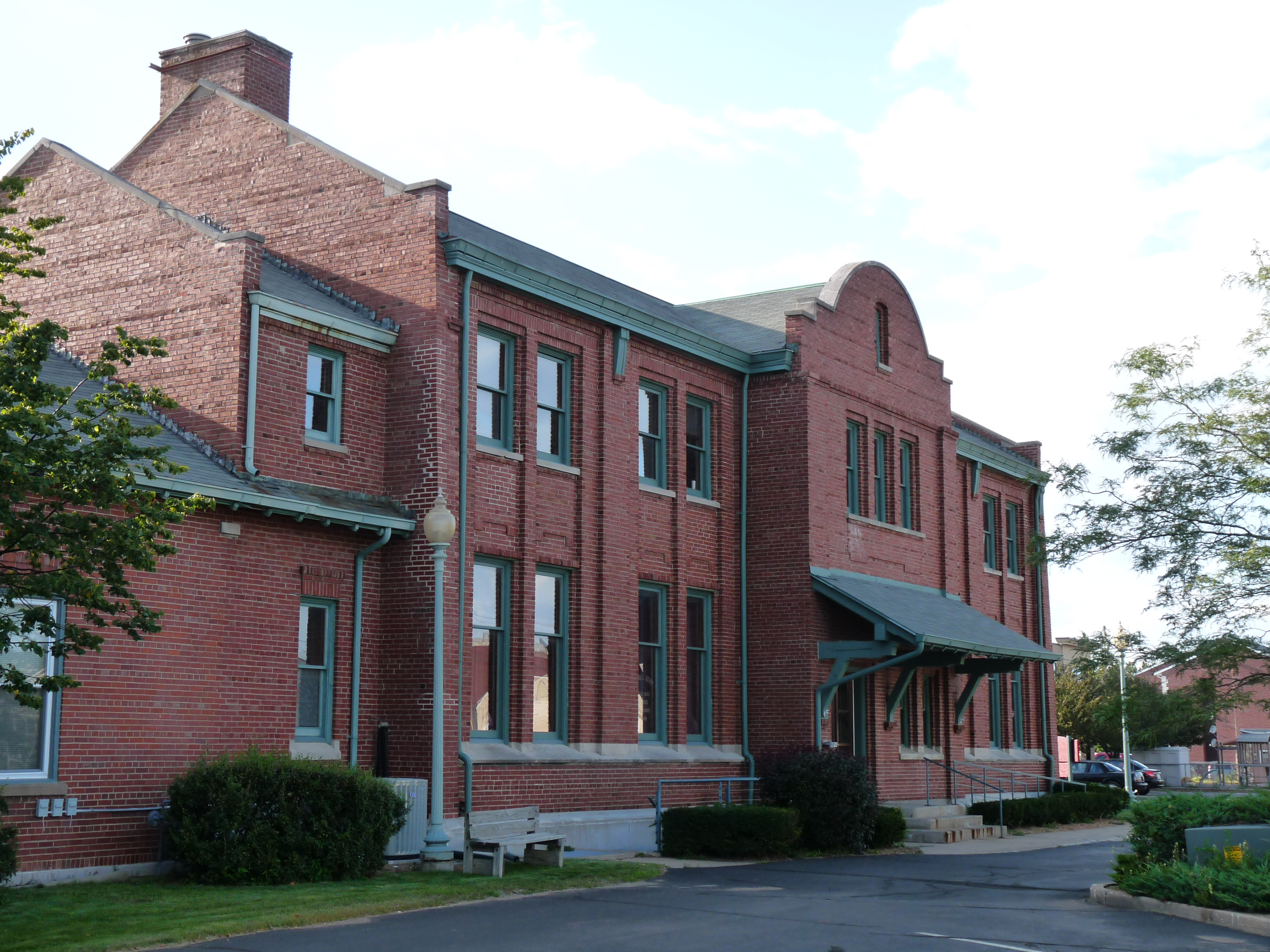
- The depot in 2010

General information
- Location: 522 Morse Street, Antigo, Wisconsin
- Coordinates: 45°8′23″N 89°9′24″W
- System: Former Chicago and North Western Railway station

Construction
- Structure type: At-grade
- Architect: Frost & Granger
- Architectural style: Classical Revival

History
- Opened: 1907

Services
Preceding station	Chicago and North Western Railway	Following station
Deerbrook toward Ashland	Ashland – Green Bay	Elmhurst, WI toward Green Bay
Terminus	Antigo – White Lake	Bryant toward White Lake
- Antigo Depot
- U.S. National Register of Historic Places
- Location within Wisconsin Location within the United States
- Location: 522 Morse St., Antigo, Wisconsin
- Coordinates: 45°8′23″N 89°9′24″W
- Area: less than one acre
- Built: 1907
- Architect: Frost & Granger; Frost, Charles Sumner
- Architectural style: Classical Revival
- NRHP reference No.: 92000029
- Added to NRHP: February 10, 1992
Location

The Antigo Depot is a historic railroad station in Antigo, Wisconsin. The depot was designed in 1907 by Charles Sumner Frost of the architectural firm Frost & Granger in the Classical Revival style for the Chicago and North Western Railway. The two-story building also housed offices for a Chicago and North Western division headquarters. After rail service to the station ended, it was converted to apartments in 1992. The depot was added to the National Register of Historic Places on February 10, 1992.
