= Wausau station =

Former railway station in Wausau, Wisconsin, U.S.

Wausau
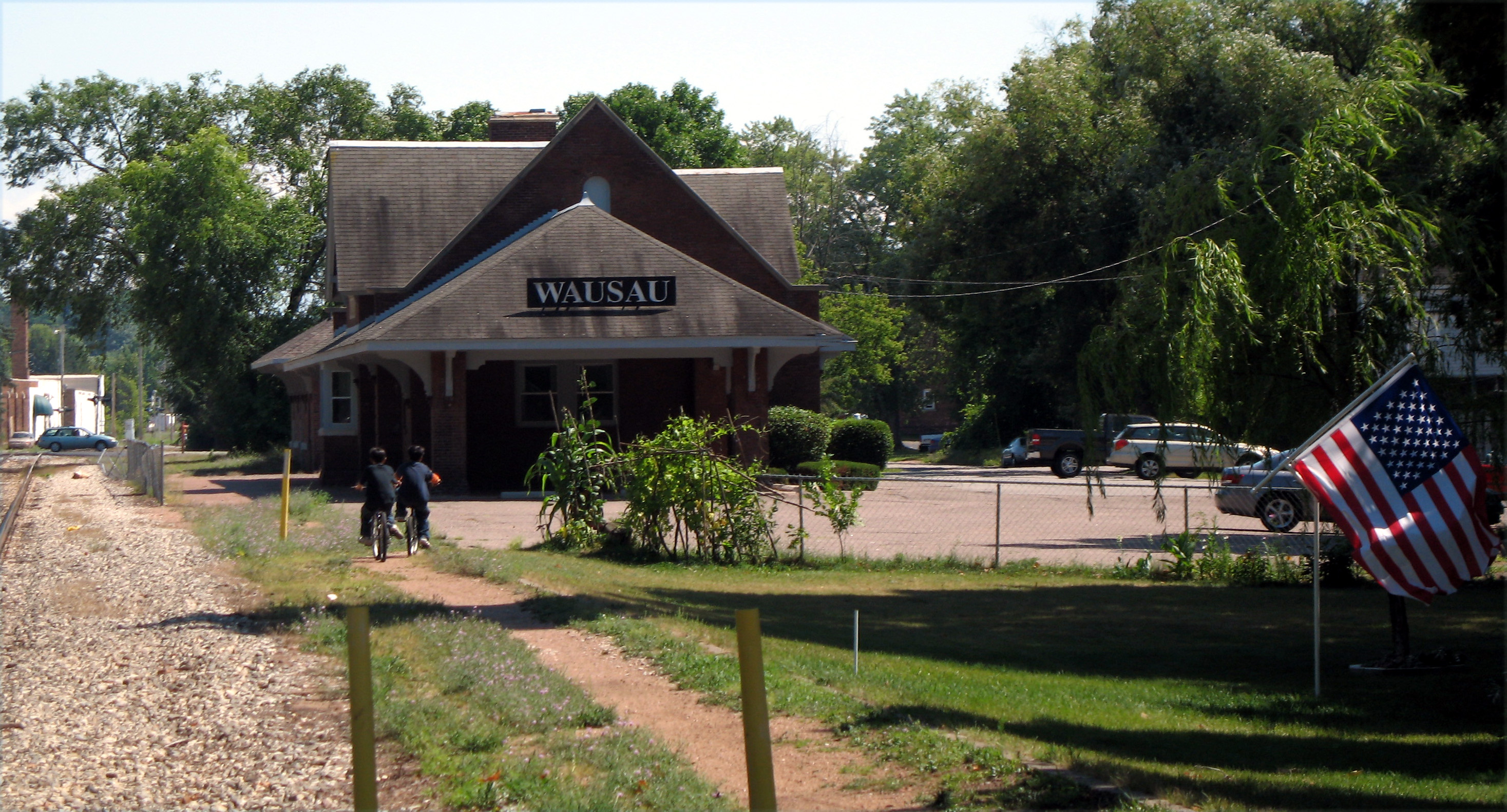
- Wausau station building in 2007

General information
- Location: 720 Grant Street; Wausau, Wisconsin 54403
- Coordinates: 44.96173°N 89.61989°W
- Owner: private
- Line: Wisconsin Valley Division
- Platforms: 1 side platform
- Tracks: 1

History
- Original company: Milwaukee Road

Former services
Through train service from Chicago and Milwaukee via New Lisbon
Location

Wausau station is a former passenger train station of the Milwaukee Road at 720 Grant Street in Wausau, Wisconsin. Wausau was on the Milwaukee’s Wisconsin Valley division and connected with the main line to Chicago at New Lisbon, Wisconsin. The station gained national attention when Wausau Insurance adopted the station as their corporate logo and launched a nationwide advertising campaign. The station ad first appeared in the January 16, 1954 edition of the Saturday Evening Post. Even after passenger service ended in 1970 the station continued to be featured in television advertising on 60 Minutes. The station gave a national identity to the city of Wausau and the company thrived in a business that is normally dominated by those in major cities. As of 2023 the station is privately owned and is re-purposed as a cocktail lounge while the former baggage building is now a distillery.

== Rail service ==
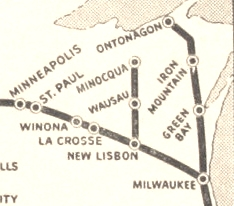
Wausau station on the Milwaukee Road Hiawatha service map in 1948

Train service arrived at Wausau in 1874 when the Wisconsin Valley Railroad reached the city. The first depot was located south of the present structure, between Washington and Jefferson streets. The original frame building was replaced by brick construction in 1880. The Milwaukee Road acquired Wisconsin Valley and commissioned the Chicago firm of Frost & Granger to design a new station in 1902. Sometime in the early 1920s a baggage and express building was added. Two daily trains served the station: The North Woods Hiawatha and The Tomahawk. Marathon County Historical Society researcher Gary Gisselman described the station as, "...quite the hub for passengers as well as freight. A good part of our history revolved around that railroad depot there on Grant Street."

In the 1940s and 1950s service north of Wausau, which had extended as far north as Boulder Junction and Star Lake, began to be cut back. Service to Star Lake ended in 1943, with trains now terminating at Woodruff. In 1956 the North Woods Hiawatha name was dropped although service continued as a numbered train. In 1961 the Milwaukee Road proposed ending passenger service but reached a compromise with the state public service commission: Passenger service would continue but sleeping car service between Wausau and Chicago was eliminated and train frequency reduced. By 1968 The Tomahawk was discontinued and remaining passenger service terminated at Wausau. In 1970 all passenger service to Wausau ceased when the former Hiawatha service ended. Service was then curtailed to the New Lisbon, Wisconsin station on the Milwaukee's main line. When Amtrak assumed passenger train operations in 1971 that too was discontinued and bypassed.

After passenger service ended the station was used as a freight office until the Milwaukee Road sold it to Wausau Insurance in 1977.

The track alongside the station remains in freight service and is now owned by the Fox Valley & Lake Superior rail system.

== Adaptive reuse ==
After Wausau Insurance acquired the building it announced plans to deconstruct the old depot and rebuild it on their new corporate campus. Although train service was gone the depot had become part of the city's identity and local residents mounted a campaign to preserve the station. The depot was saved when the local historical commission found a new tenant for the building, the local Boy Scout council who would use the renovated depot from 1980-2000. After the council moved to new quarters occupancy changed over several times until 2015 when it again became vacant. In 2018 it was purchased by its current owners and renovated into a cocktail lounge.

In 1999 a Boston-based corporation acquired Wausau Insurance. The station continued to be used in their advertising until 2009 when the Wausau brand was discontinued.

== Replica station ==
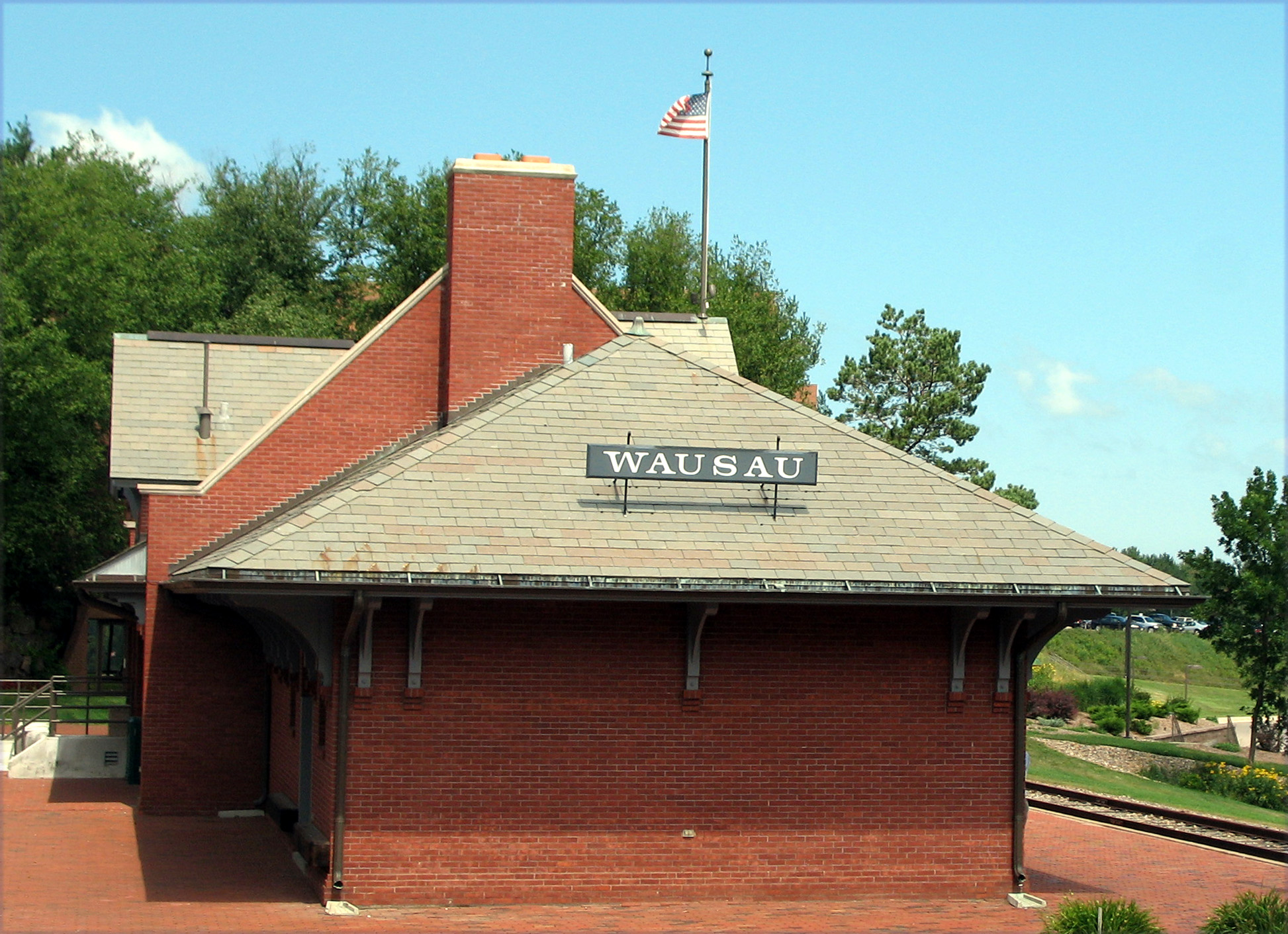
1980 replica of Wausau station on the former Wausau Insurance company campus

In 1980 Wausau Insurance built an exact replica of the original station at 1800 Westwood Center Boulevard. It never had a physical connection to any railroad but was used for corporate meetings and entertainment. In 2015 it became a meeting and event rental facility.
