= Fox Lake station (Wisconsin) =

Fox Lake
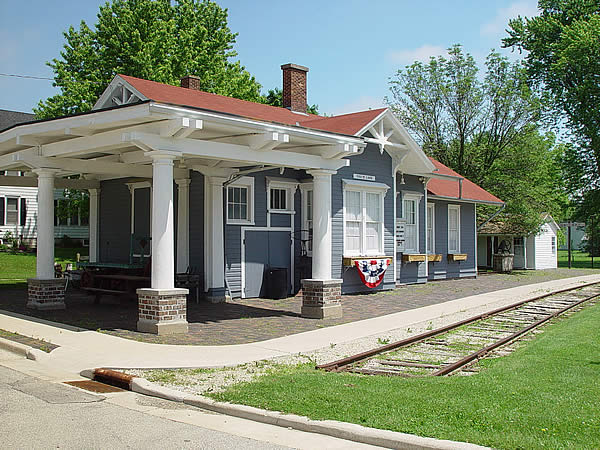
- Fox Lake station in September 2012.

General information
- Location: 211 East Cordelia Street, Fox Lake, Wisconsin 53933
- System: Former Milwaukee Road passenger rail station

History
- Opened: 1884

Services
Preceding station	Milwaukee Road	Following station
Randolph toward Portage	Portage – Horicon	Beaver Dam toward Horicon
- Fox Lake Railroad Depot
- U.S. National Register of Historic Places
- Location within Wisconsin
- Location: Cordelia St. and S. College Avenue, Fox Lake, Wisconsin
- Coordinates: 43°33′40″N 88°54′31″W
- Area: 1 acre (0.40 ha)
- Built: 1884
- NRHP reference No.: 78000093
- Added to NRHP: May 22, 1978
Location

The Fox Lake Railroad Depot is located in Fox Lake, Wisconsin.

== History ==
The depot was built by the Chicago, Milwaukee, St. Paul and Pacific Railroad (Milwaukee Road) in 1884, with porte-cochère added in 1919. It served passengers including resort patrons until the 1950s and freight until 1970. Currently, it serves as a museum.

It was listed on the National Register of Historic Places in 1978 and the State Register of Historic Places in 1989.
