= Beaver Dam station =

Railway station in Beaver Dam, the United States of America

Beaver Dam
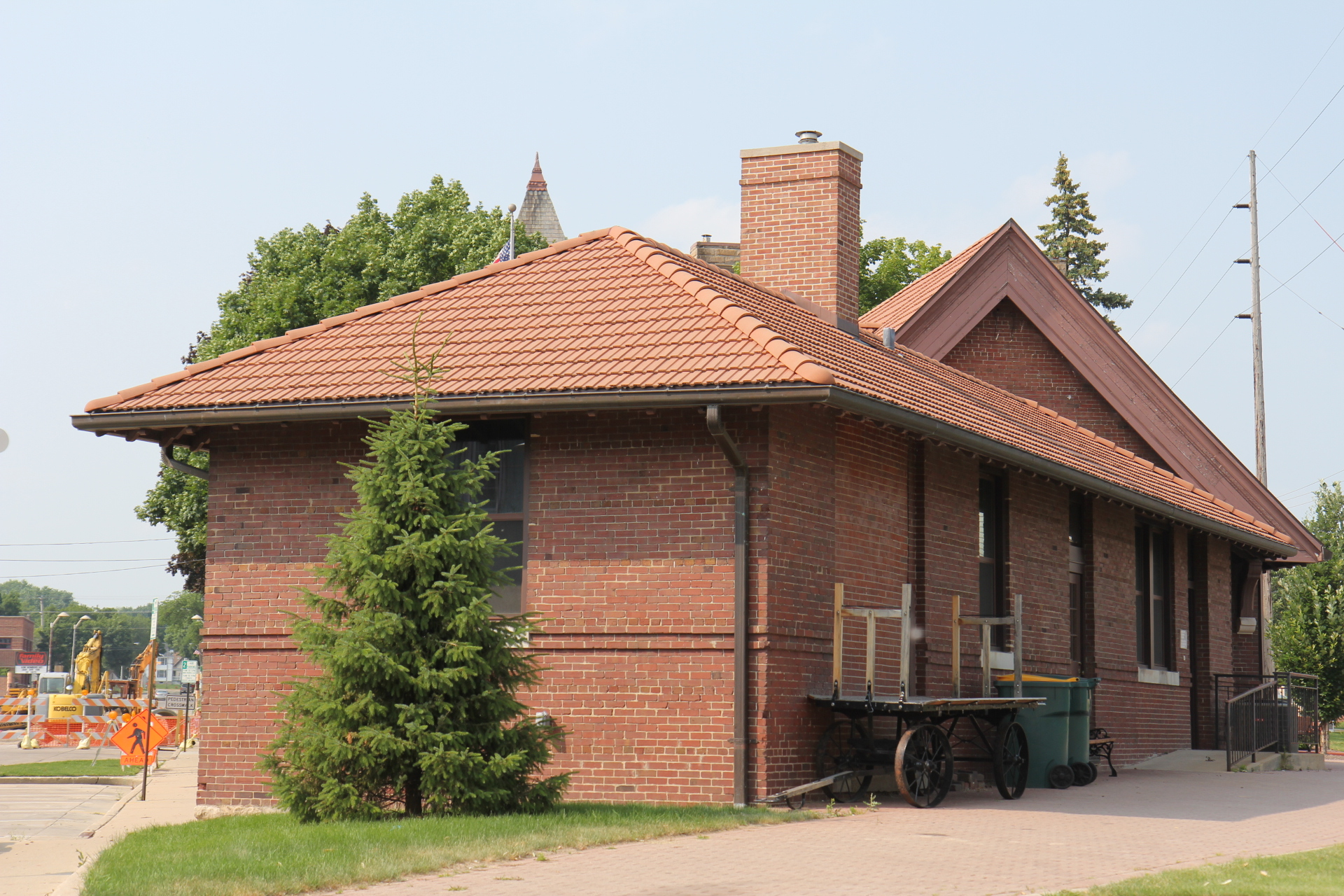
- Chicago, Milwaukee and St. Paul Railway Company Passenger Depot.

General information
- Location: 127 South Spring Street, Beaver Dam, Wisconsin 53916
- System: Former Milwaukee Road passenger rail station

Services
Preceding station	Milwaukee Road	Following station
Fox Lake toward Portage	Portage – Horicon	Rolling Prairie toward Horicon
- Chicago, Milwaukee and St. Paul Railway Company Passenger Depot
- U.S. National Register of Historic Places
- Location within Wisconsin
- Location: 127 S. Spring St., Beaver Dam, Wisconsin
- Coordinates: 43°27′22″N 88°50′10″W
- Area: less than one acre
- Built: 1900
- Architect: Frost & Granger
- Architectural style: Victorian
- NRHP reference No.: 81000039
- Added to NRHP: July 7, 1981
Location

The Chicago, Milwaukee and St. Paul Railway Passenger Depot is located in Beaver Dam, Wisconsin.

== History ==
The building is a red brick cottage-like depot of the Chicago, Milwaukee, St. Paul and Pacific Railroad designed by Frost & Granger and built in 1900. It later served as the Dodge County Historical Museum before being restored to house the Beaver Dam Chamber of Commerce.

It was listed on the National Register of Historic Places in 1981 and on the State Register of Historic Places in 1989.
