= Reedsburg station =

- Chicago and North Western Depot
- U.S. National Register of Historic Places
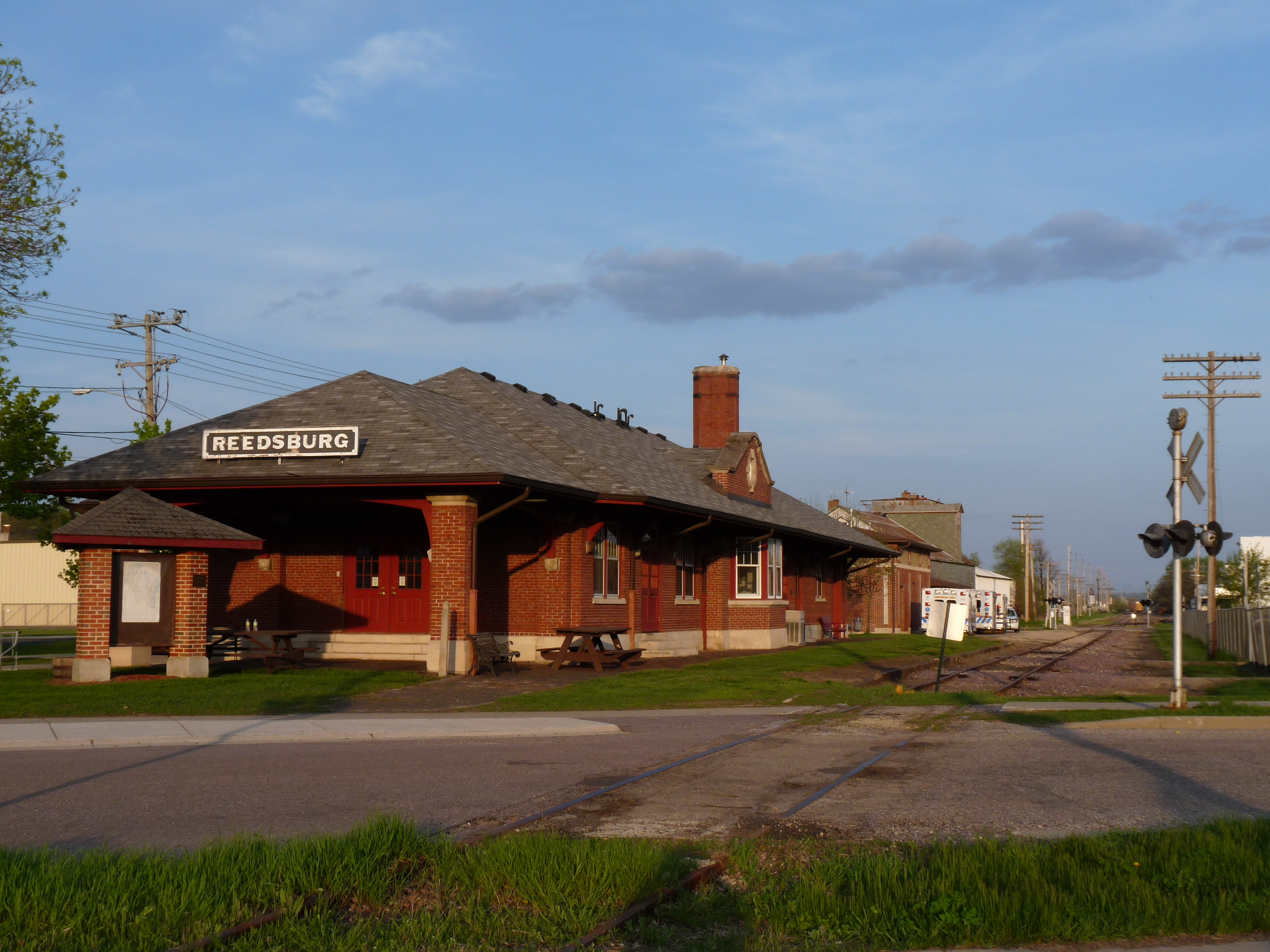
- Chicago and North Western Depot

- Location within Wisconsin Location within the United States
- Location: Railroad St., Reedsburg, Wisconsin
- Coordinates: 43°31′49″N 90°00′27″W
- Area: less than one acre
- Built: 1905
- Architect: Frost & Granger
- Architectural style: Neoclassical
- MPS: Reedsburg MRA
- NRHP reference No.: 84000639
- Added to NRHP: December 26, 1984

Reedsburg station is a former railway station in Reedsburg, Wisconsin, which has been on the National Register of Historic Places since 1984. Built in 1906, the station served the Chicago and North Western Railway along the Twin Cities 400 line for much of its life. It operated as a passenger station until closing in July 1963. Currently, it houses the Reedsburg Chamber of Commerce and the headquarters for the 400 State Trail. The railway line, however, remains in use by Wisconsin and Southern Railroad.

Preceding station	Chicago and North Western Railway	Following station
LaValle toward Minneapolis	Chicago – Minneapolis via Madison	Ableman toward Chicago
