= Gold Coast Historic District (Chicago) =

Neighborhood in Chicago, Illinois

- U.S. National Register of Historic Places
- U.S. Historic district
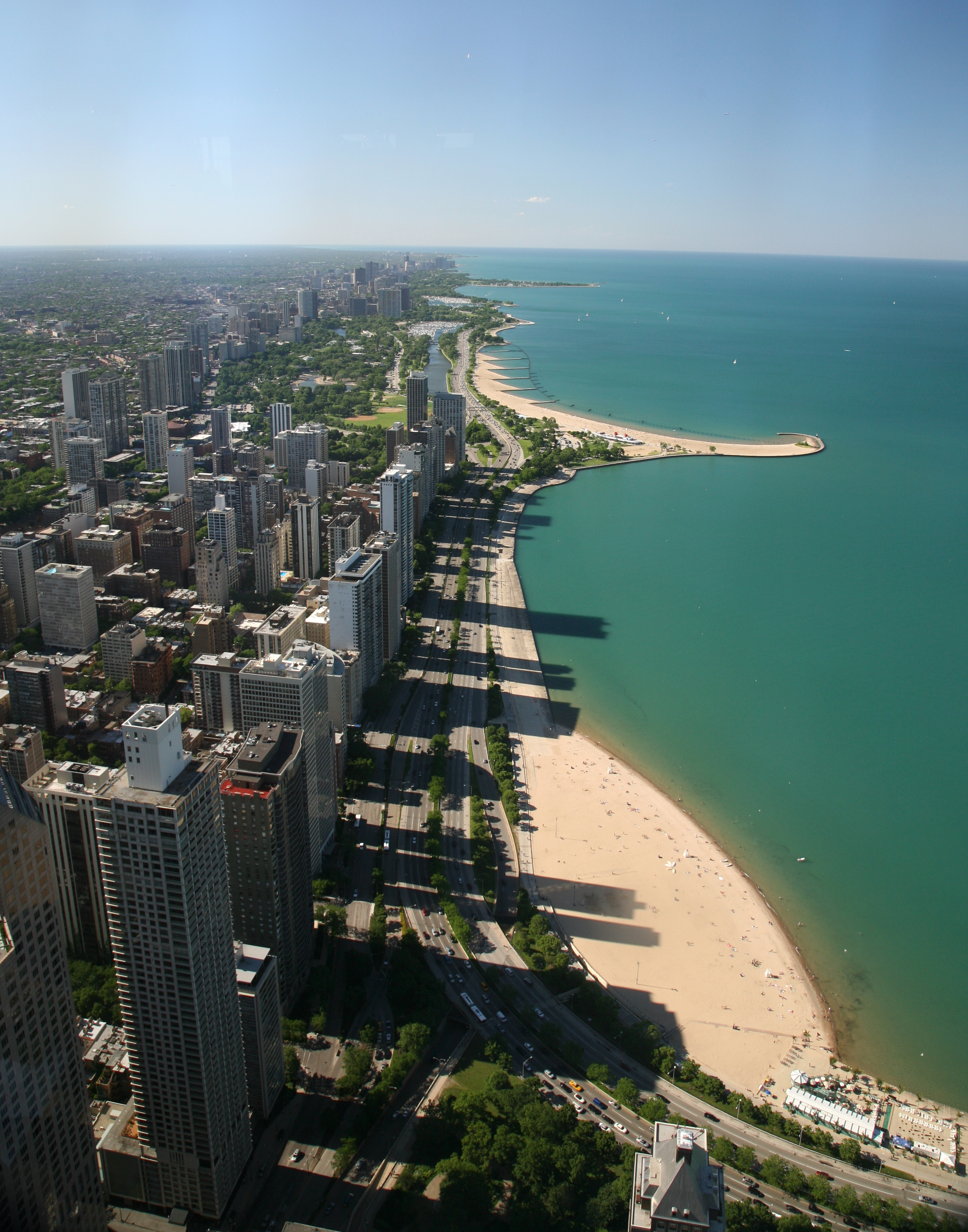
- Gold Coast's Oak Street Beach

- Location within Chicago metropolitan area Location within Illinois Location within the United States
- Location: Roughly bounded by North Ave., Lake Shore Dr., Clark and Oak Sts., Chicago, Illinois
- Coordinates: 41°54′21″N 87°37′41″W
- Architect: McKim, Mead & White; multiple
- Architectural style: Moderne, Italianate, Queen Anne
- NRHP reference No.: 78001121
- Added to NRHP: January 30, 1978

The Gold Coast Historic District is a historic district in Chicago, Illinois. Part of Chicago's Near North Side community area, it is roughly bounded by North Avenue, Lake Shore Drive, Oak Street, and Clark Street.

The nearby East Lake Shore Drive District and parts of northern Streeterville and the Magnificent Mile near the lake also may be considered part of the Gold Coast (such as the area around the 860-880 Lake Shore Drive Apartments), even if not technically in the historic designation. The mayor's office map extends the Gold Coast south to the area of Northwestern University's Chicago campus.

As of 2011, Gold Coast ranks as the seventh-richest urban neighborhood in the United States with a median household income of $153,358.

== History ==
The Gold Coast neighborhood grew in the wake of the Great Chicago Fire. In 1882, millionaire Potter Palmer moved to the area from the Prairie Avenue neighborhood on the city's south side. He filled in a swampy area which later became Lake Shore Drive, and built the Palmer Mansion, a forty-two room castle-like structure designed by Henry Ives Cobb and Charles Sumner Frost. Other wealthy Chicagoans followed Potter into the neighborhood, which became one of the richest in Chicago.

In 1886 the first apartment building was constructed. The Edward G. Pauling Apartments, designed by Dankmar Adler and Louis Sullivan, on the 1200 block of Astor Street. This development demonstrated how rapidly the neighborhood shifted from empty land to an active residential district, fulfilling Potter Palmer’s vision for the area’s development. By 1913, the small three-story building was removed to accommodate a larger apartment development, showing how quickly the district continued to evolve.

The district was added to the National Register of Historic Places in 1978.

In the late 1980s, the Gold Coast and neighboring Streeterville comprised the second most-affluent neighborhood in the United States, behind New York City's Upper East Side.

== Description ==
The Gold Coast Historic District is one of Chicago’s residential areas, recognized for its retail, dining, cultural attractions, and preserved architectural landmarks.

=== Retail ===
The Gold Coast is also a major destination for high-end shopping. Visitors can find upscale clothing, fine jewelry, and designer bags, along with unique specialty shops that showcase artwork and curated goods.

Oak Street is the center of retail in the Gold Coast. This shopping district holds a variety of stores. Retailers in the Gold Coast Historic District include: Prada, Chanel, Hermès, Moncler, Cartier, Dior, Versace, Christian Louboutin, Bottega Veneta, Balenciaga, Patagonia, Aritzia, Brandy Melville, Le Labo, CELINE, Kith, Reformation, Bloomingdale's, Madewell, Glossier, Lululemon, Giorgio Armani, Golden Goose, Arc’teryx, Vuori, Cos, and several boutiques unique to the area.

The Gold Coast is surrounded by other shopping districts in the Magnificent Mile.

=== Dining ===
The Gold Coast district features a diverse and upscale dining scene. Blue Door Kitchen & Garden offers a farm-to-table menu. The neighborhood is also home to Adalina, an upscale Italian restaurant with a culinary program led by a Michelin-starred chef. Another notable restaurant is Le Colonial, a French–Vietnamese restaurant overlooking Oak Street. The district also includes Maple & Ash, a steakhouse with elaborate service style, high prices, and nightlife energy. Another popular dining destination is the 3 Arts Club Café, located inside the historic Three Arts Club building and known for its distinctive atrium setting, combining dining with interior design and retail.

Chicago’s signature deep-dish pizza is also represented in the neighborhood through Lou Malnati’s, one of the city’s iconic pizzerias.

Other dining in the area includes: Sushi by Bou, Sparrow, Pandan, Dublin’s Bar and Grill, The Bellevue, Gibson’s Bar and Steakhouse, Tavern on Rush, Adorn Bar and Restaurant, The Original Pancake House, Hugo’s Frog Bar, Gotham Bagels, Carmine’s, Luxbar, and Butch McGuire's.

=== Hotels ===
The Gold Coast is home to two 5-star hotels, The Four Seasons and The Waldorf Astoria. Along with several other prominent hotels like the Ambassador Chicago, Thompson Chicago, and Viceroy Chicago, which are all in close proximity to the neighborhood’s major dining and shopping areas.

=== Landmarks and environment ===
The Gold Coast Historic District is home to many landmarks. The original, and former, Playboy Mansion is located in the area. Along with other landmarks like the James Charnley House and Astor Street Homes.

Other areas of entertainment in the district include The Newberry Library, The International Museum of Surgical Science, and Oak Street Beach where visitors can enjoy views of Lake Michigan framed by the city’s skyline.

== Education ==
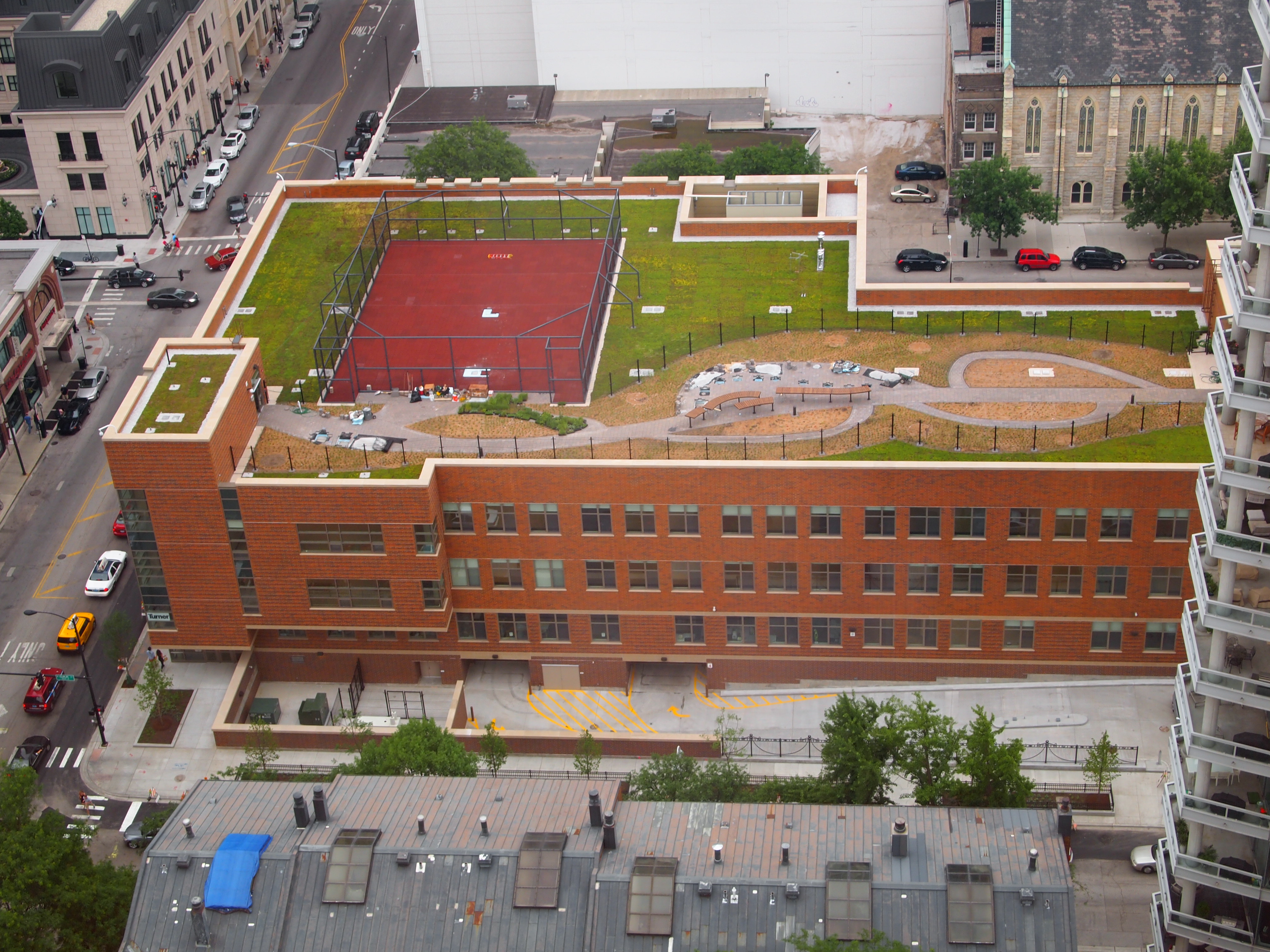
Aerial view of the Ogden International School East (elementary) campus

Chicago Public Schools (CPS) operates public schools serving the community. Ogden International School of Chicago has its East Campus, which houses elementary school, in the Gold Coast.

Residents of the Gold Coast are zoned to Ogden School for grades K-8, while for high school they are zoned to Lincoln Park High School. Any graduate from Ogden's 8th grade program may automatically move on to the 9th grade at Ogden, but students who did not graduate from Ogden's middle school must apply to the high school.

The Latin School of Chicago, a K-12 private school, is also located in the Gold Coast.

== Notable residents ==
Gold Coast has a long tradition of being home to some of the nation's wealthiest and influential residents. These include:

- J. B. Pritzker – businessman, venture capitalist, politician and current Governor of Illinois, member of the Pritzker family
- MK Pritzker – civic leader, philanthropist, and current First Lady of Illinois
- Lori Greiner – inventor, entrepreneur, and television personality
- Vince Vaughn – actor
- Lee Miglin – real estate developer
- Ernest Hemingway – author and journalist
- Meredith Marks – television personality
- Joan Cusack – actress

== Photos ==
Gold Coast Gallery
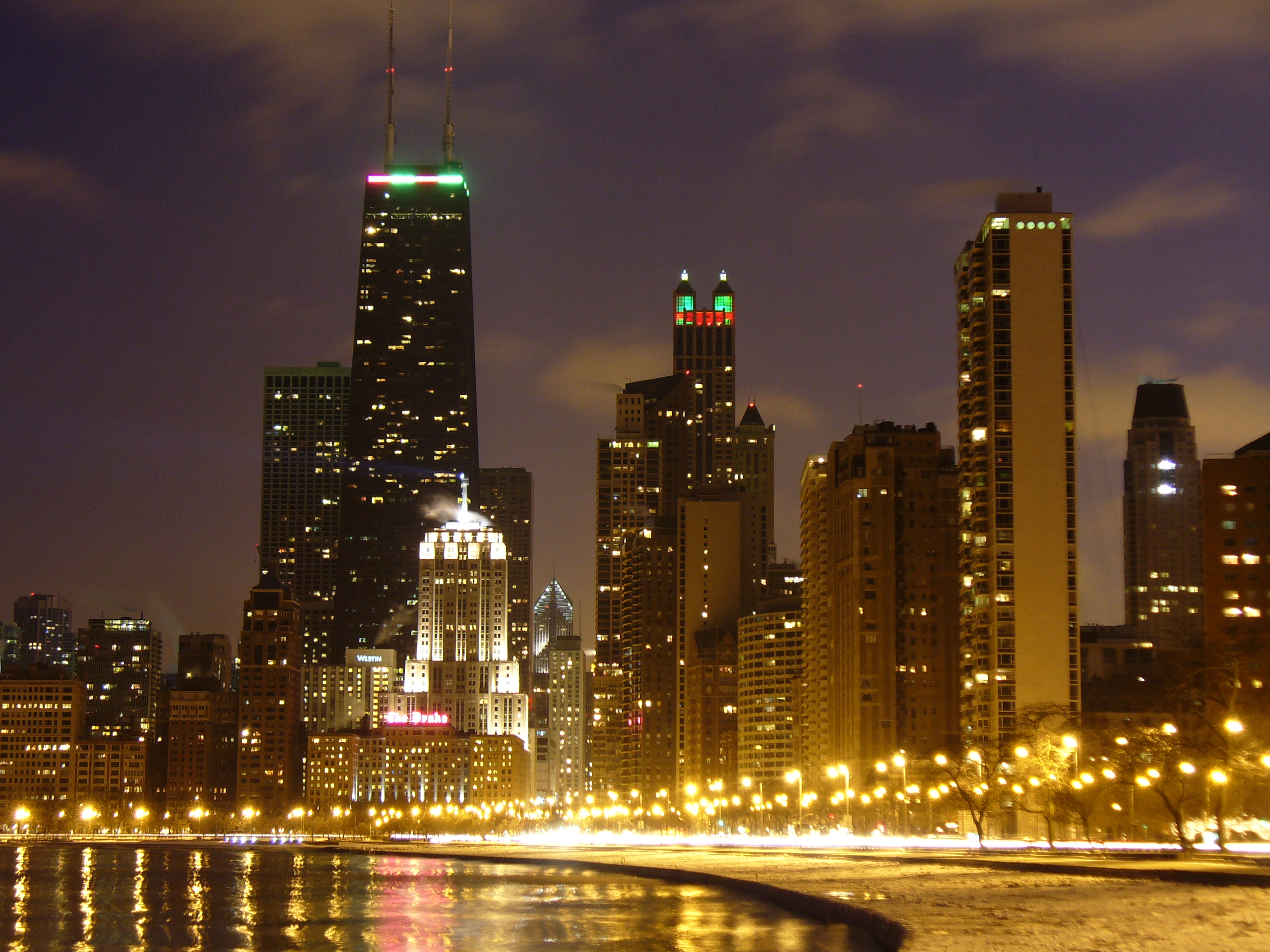
Night on the Gold Coast (including East Lake Shore Drive District)

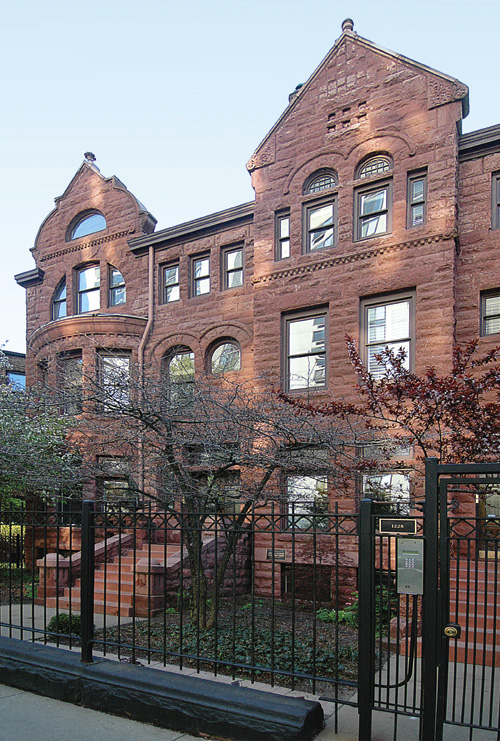
Luxury condominiums on Dearborn Street in the Gold Coast

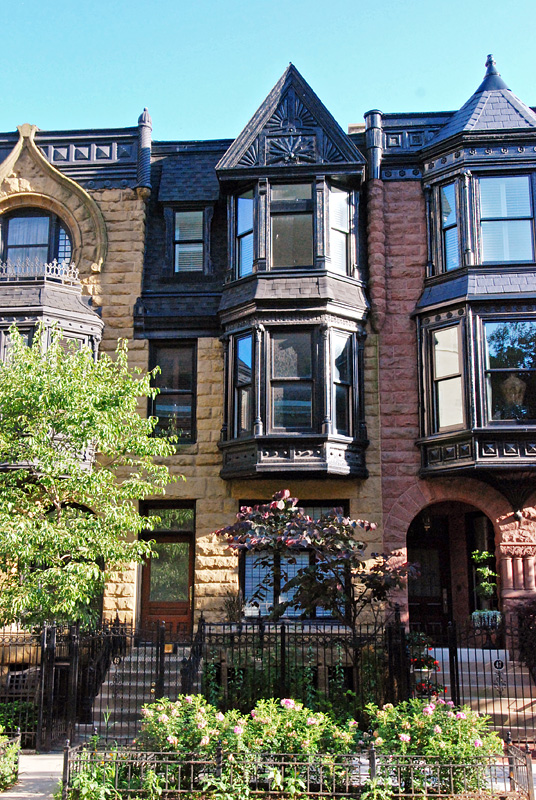
Townhomes on East Division Street in the Gold Coast

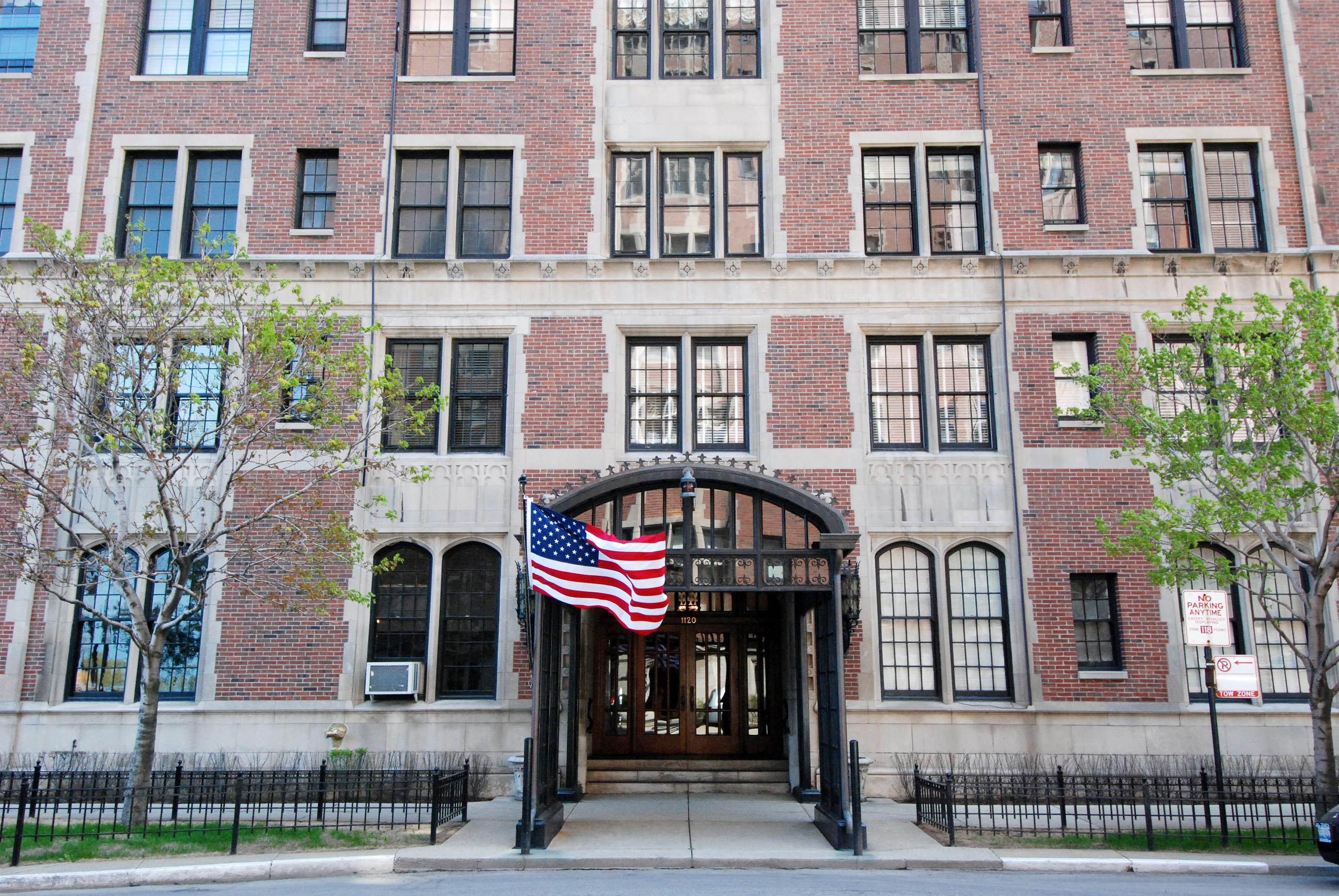
Cooperative apartments on Lake Shore Drive in the Gold Coast

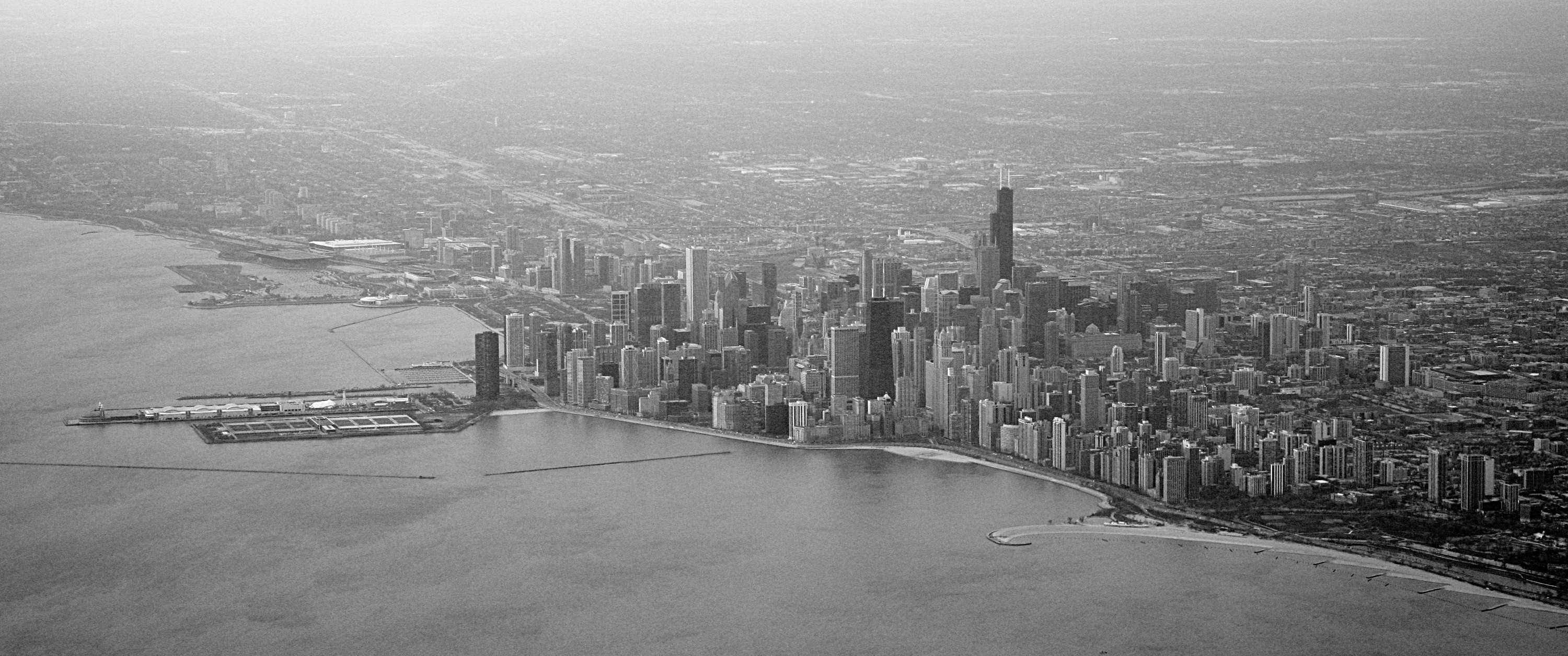
The Gold Coast is a prominent part of the skyline

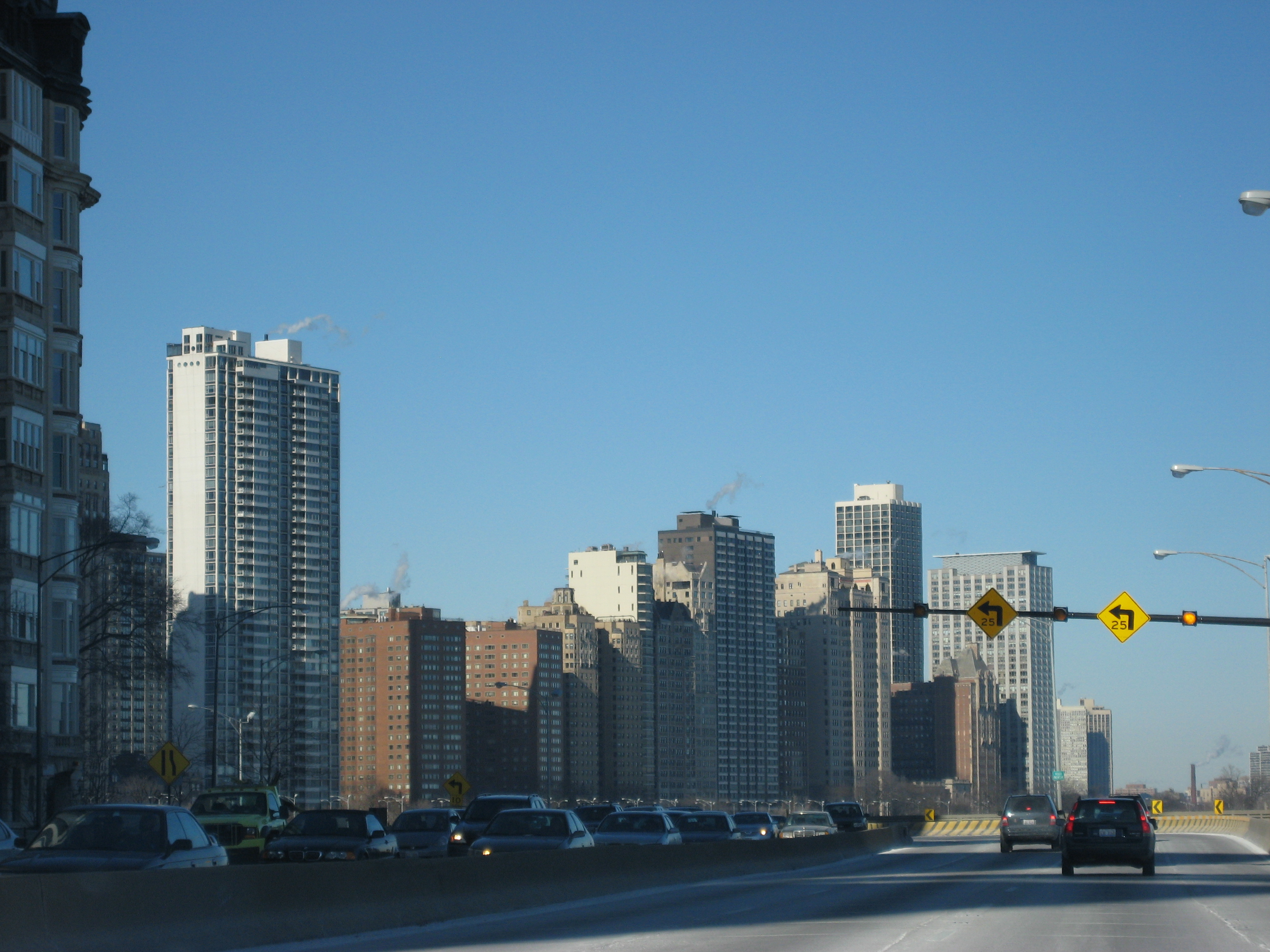
Gold Coast from Streeterville

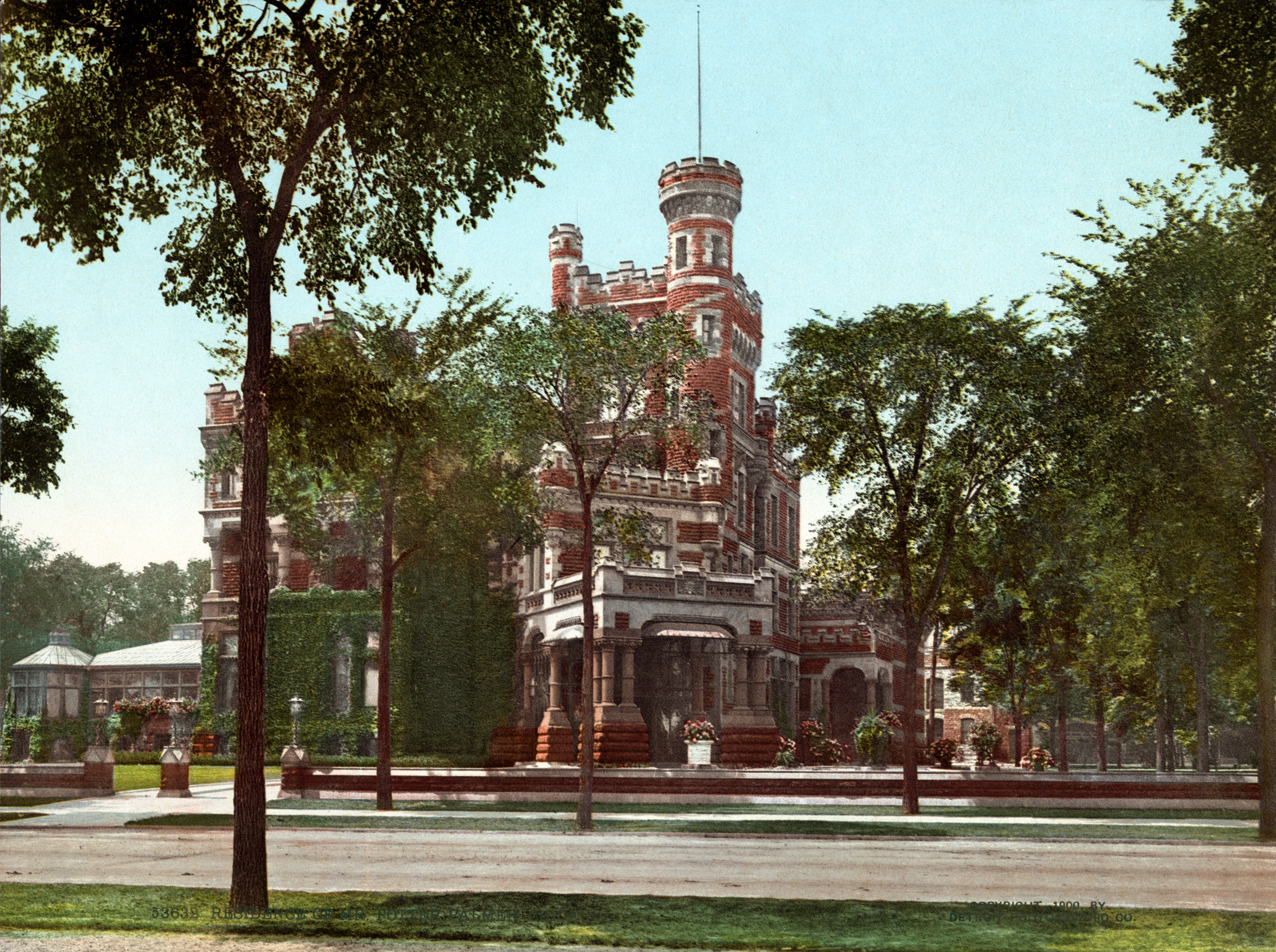
Palmer Mansion (demolished in 1951)

Historical images of Chicago's Gold Coast can be found in Explore Chicago Collections, a digital repository made available by Chicago Collections archives, libraries and other cultural institutions in the city.

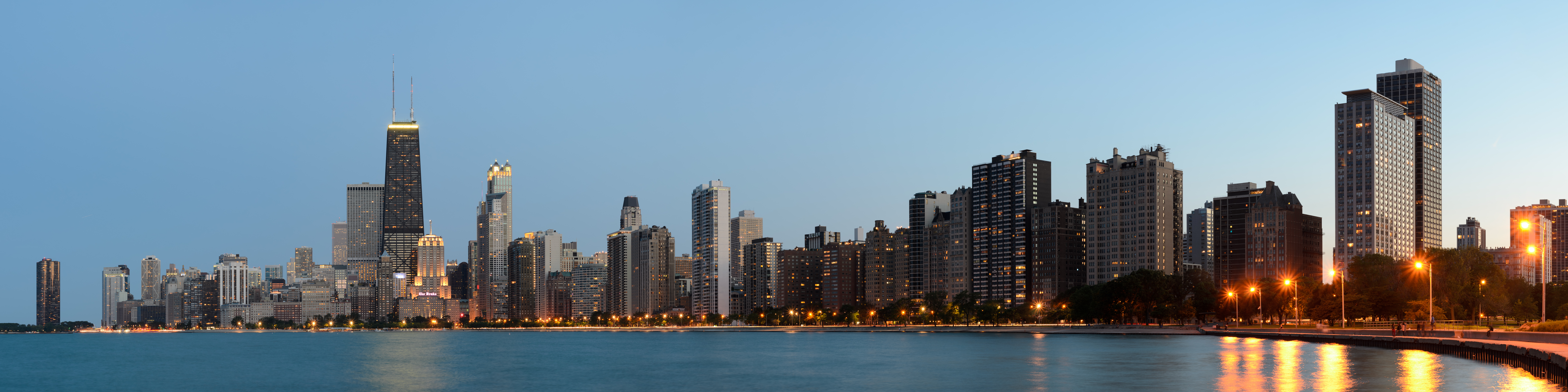
Chicago Gold Coast from North Avenue Beach looking south.

== See also ==
- National Register of Historic Places listings in Central Chicago
