= Bertha Palmer =

American art collector (1849–1918)

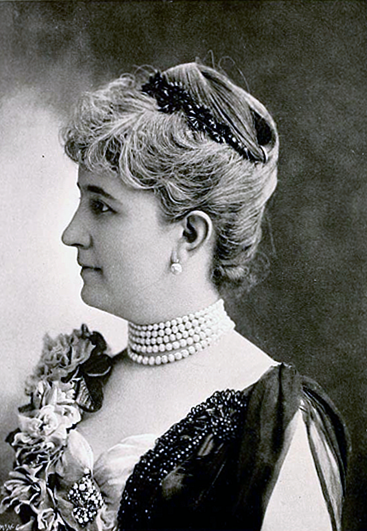
- Born: Bertha Matilde Honoré; May 22, 1849; Louisville, Kentucky
- Died: July 25, 1918 (aged 69); Osprey, Florida
- Resting place: Graceland Cemetery, Chicago
- Occupations: Businesswoman, socialite, and philanthropist
- Spouse: Potter Palmer (m. 1870–1902)
- Children: 2 sons

Bertha Matilde Palmer (née Honoré; May 22, 1849 – May 5, 1918) was an American businesswoman, socialite, and philanthropist. She was the wife of millionaire Potter Palmer and early member of the Chicago Woman's Club, as well as president of the Board of Lady Managers. She is most known for her work during the 1893 World's Columbian Exposition, as well as her donation of her impressionist art collection to the Art Institute of Chicago.

== Early life ==
Born as Bertha Matilde Honoré in Louisville, Kentucky, her father was businessman Henry Hamilton Honoré. Her family moved to Chicago in 1855, when Bertha was six years old. Known within the family as "Cissie", she studied in her home town and achieved a reputation as a musician, linguist, writer, politician, and administrator. She was one of six children, and the oldest of the Honoré daughters. Her sister, Ida Marie Honoré, was married to Frederick Dent Grant, eldest son of general and president Ulysses S. Grant. She was a graduate of Georgetown Visitation Preparatory School, and also attended St. Xavier Academy. She graduated in 1867 with high academic achievements which included multiple fields of science, literature, and algebra.

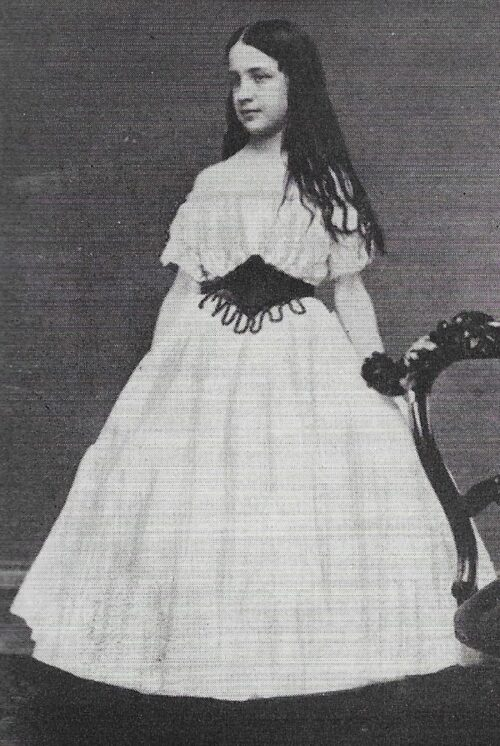
Bertha Palmer at age thirteen

== Personal life and marriage ==
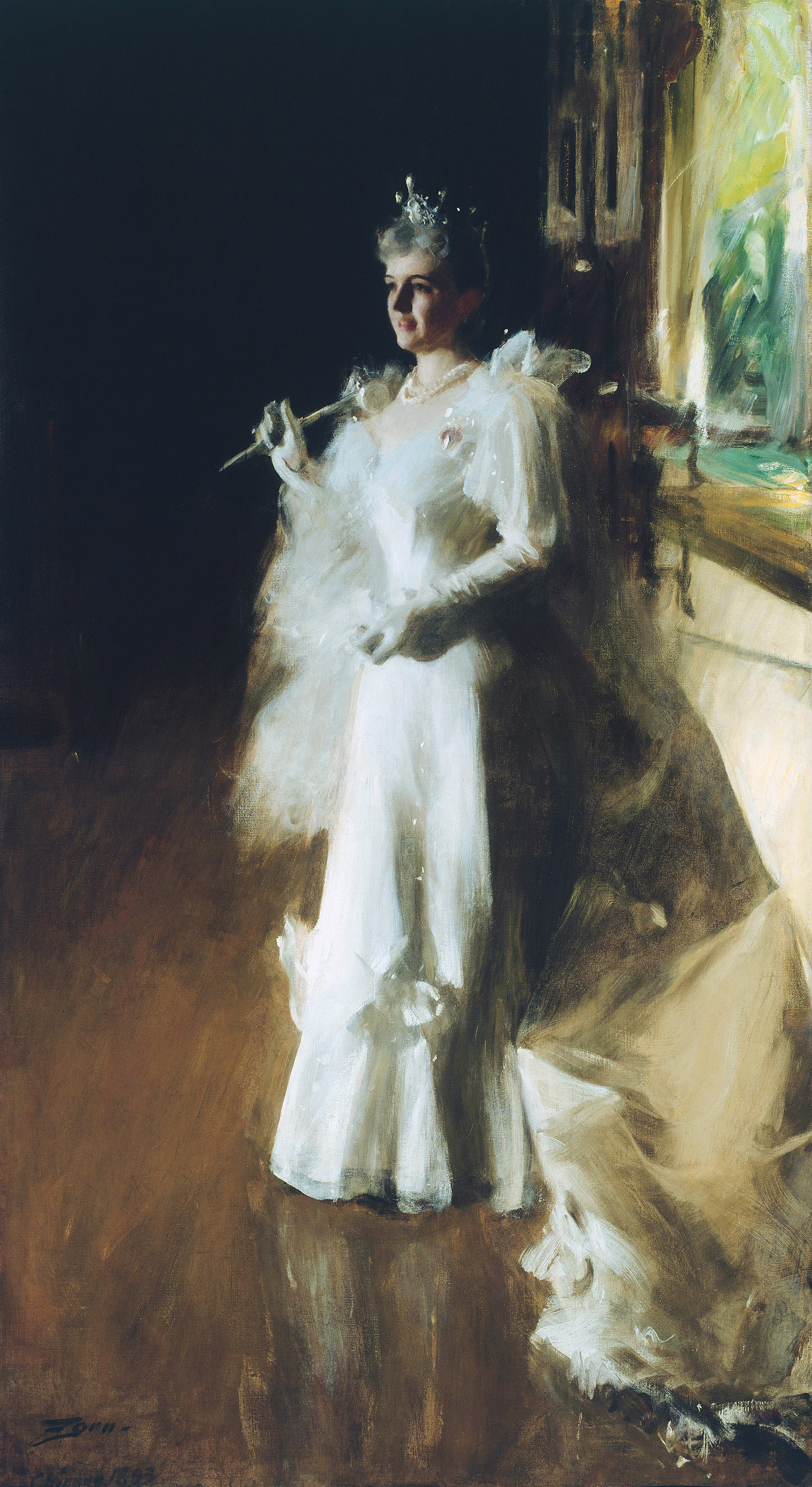
Portrait titled Mrs. Potter Palmer by Anders Zorn, 1893

She married the Chicago millionaire Potter Palmer in 1870. She was 21 and he was 44. Palmer was a Quaker merchant who had come to Chicago after failing twice in business. The two met in 1862 when Bertha was just 13 years old.

In Chicago, he learned to please his customers, many of whom were women. He made customer service a priority and carried everything from dry goods to the latest French fashions for ladies. Palmer sold his vast store to a consortium, and it would eventually become Marshall Field's. Palmer then opened a luxury hotel, Palmer House, and invested in real estate, eventually owning a vast portfolio of properties.

Soon after their marriage, the Chicago Fire wiped out the Palmer House and most of their holdings. Bertha Palmer had to rush off to wire the east so that Palmer could re-establish credit, borrow money and rebuild his holdings. 95% of Palmers buildings and assets were destroyed in the fire. Shortly after the fire, Bertha Palmer changed Potter Palmer's mind about leaving Chicago. Bertha Palmer was unusually poised for one so young, and together, the Palmers re-established their fortune. Despite her age, she quickly rose to the top of Chicago society. "She was beautiful, dashing, quick, and smart; and more than that, she was sure of herself," wrote historian Ernest Poole.

In 1874, she gave birth to son Honoré, and in 1875, she gave birth to son Potter Palmer II. Both sons went on to have children including Potter Palmer II naming his son Potter Palmer III.

Palmer was an early member of the Chicago Woman's Club, and part of the General Federation of Women's Clubs; this group of working women met to discuss social problems and develop solutions. They supported kindergartens until the city made them part of the school system, campaigned for inexpensive milk for impoverished children, and better care for children of imprisoned mothers. She was also an early member of the Fortnightly Club of Chicago, alongside Jane Addams and Ellen Martin Henrotin, and was a patron of the Women's Trade Union League that worked to start unions and safe working conditions for factory girls. She and Mr. Palmer were also members of the esteemed Chicago Club. Even though the Palmer House did sell alcohol, Palmer was quite interested in the Women's Christian Temperance Union. She helped found the Chicago chapter of the Daughters of the American Revolution but later learned she did not qualify for membership.

Palmer approved of Jane Addams' work at Hull House and gave aid when needed to the civil service. Her main goal was women's education and funding programs that would help. "'If funds were lacking for any good cause, or if we had to make up a quota, we just asked the Potter Palmers,' commented Mrs. Carter H. Harrison, the Mayor's wife". While she never was a suffragette, she did understand the importance of rights for women, believing that men and women should work together to solve their problems. She was a socialite woman who followed the problems and difficulties of the classes lower than her own.

While she believed in women's rights, and helping the working class, she was more conservative with her politics and thinking. As the President of the Board of Lady Managers she was very firm and often clashed with women under her who did not agree with her more conservative beliefs including her refusal of African American women to join the Board of Lady Managers to include and satisfy factions of women from the south.

== Chicago World's Fair and The Women's Building ==
Chicago was the site of the World's Columbian Exposition in 1893, a celebration of the discovery of the New World by Columbus. It also marked the city's recovery from the Great Chicago Fire of 1871.

Women had a large presence in the fair and the plum position was the President of the Board of Lady Managers, which Bertha Palmer was selected to lead in 1891. While the positions were honorary, the women had a great deal of work to do. The board chose Sophia Hayden as architect for The Woman's Building and designer to supervise the interior decoration. However, when Hayden wouldn't take Palmer's advice to accept rich women's donations of architectural odds and ends to decorate the exterior, fearing a horrible visual impact as a result, Palmer fired Hayden and hired the much more malleable Candace Wheeler to supervise the interior decoration.

The Chicago art curator Sarah Tyson Hallowell (1846–1924) worked closely with Palmer on the art exhibits and the murals. Apparently, it was Palmer who chose the theme of "Primitive Woman" and "Modern Woman" for the two murals and Hallowell and Palmer's first choice for both murals was Elizabeth Jane Gardner (1837–1922), an experienced academic painter and the paramour of William-Adolphe Bouguereau (1825–1905). However, the time to paint the two huge murals (12' x 54') was short and the artist did not feel that she had the energy to complete the project. Hallowell then recommended the young academic painter Mary Fairchild MacMonnies and the Impressionist painter Mary Cassatt to do the two murals and after their initial rejection of the contracts, the women only had a number of months to complete the murals and have them shipped to Chicago. Led by Palmer, who approached Congress on the matter, the board also requested that the mint produce a new commemorative coin for the Exposition and their efforts resulted in the Isabella quarter.

Following the opening of the Exposition, Palmer sat for the fashionable Swedish painter Anders Zorn (1860–1920), who was commissioned by the Board of Lady Managers from the fair. Relative to Ms. Palmer's Inclusivity: (CNN: 2021) "That year (World Fair), for the very first time, a group of White women managed to obtain the space and funds for a "Women's Building" to showcase American women's achievements from the past century. During the closing ceremony of The Woman's Building, Bertha Palmer delivered the final address stating, "Not only have the material exhibits drawn attention to the skill of women and shown the point of development which has been reached by them, but their interests, their capabilities, their needs, and their hopes have been brought before the public and thoroughly discussed from every point of view during the time of preparation for, as well as during the continuance of, the Exposition".

According to at least one legend, Palmer helped invent the chocolate brownie when she directed that her kitchen staff come up with a confection smaller than a piece of cake for women attending the Columbian Exposition.

One of Palmer's challenges as President of the Board of Lady Managers was greeting the highly official guests that arrived at the fair; the most difficult, Infanta Eulalia of Spain. Since the beginning of her stay, the Infanta was quite difficult especially when it came to talking to Bertha Palmer, who she had called "'An innkeeper's wife!'" referring to Bertha's relation to The Palmer House. Since the Infanta was royalty, she did not like Bertha Palmer's lavish lifestyle as it appeared to the Infanta that Palmer was competing with the duchess as to who had the best grace and authority. The conflict between the two women made it to the newspapers. "The story took on exaggerated twists. It was gleefully related that the two women had occupied separate thrones in the ballroom, but that there had not been enough room under one roof for two such regal personages. It was more than rumor that guests had been asked to bow and curtsy twice- once to the Infanta and once to their hostess".

== Art collecting ==
At the time of the fair, the Palmers had been enthusiastic art collectors for a number of years. They depended on the curator Sarah Hallowell, a Philadelphia Quaker who they had met in 1873, for advice and she introduced the Palmers to the painters in Paris and to the latest artistic trends in the French capital. Most Midwestern collectors were still collecting works by the Barbizon School in the 1870s and 1880s, but thanks to the Palmers, this would soon change. In the years leading up to the Columbian Exposition, they became clients of the Parisian dealer Paul Durand-Ruel and began to collect French Impressionist works. Because Hallowell was curating a loan exhibition of the latest French art for the exposition, the Palmers accelerated their collecting because the curator wanted the latest and greatest in French art for the fair. Palmer's collection of Impressionist paintings was unrivaled, soon they had twenty-nine Monets and eleven Renoirs, nine of the Monets were from the Haystacks series, painted 1890–91. These works now form the core of the Art Institute of Chicago's Impressionist collection. Hallowell also tried to get the Palmers interested in Auguste Rodin's work, which he had loaned her for the fair. The frankness of his nudes had caused a stir at the fair and after resisting for a number of months, works by Rodin entered the collection as well and these were among the first acquired by American collectors. Bertha Palmer enjoyed her role as a cultural leader and tastemaker. In 1905, Hallowell finally convinced Mrs. Palmer to sit for Rodin.

== Luxurious mansions and lavish spending ==
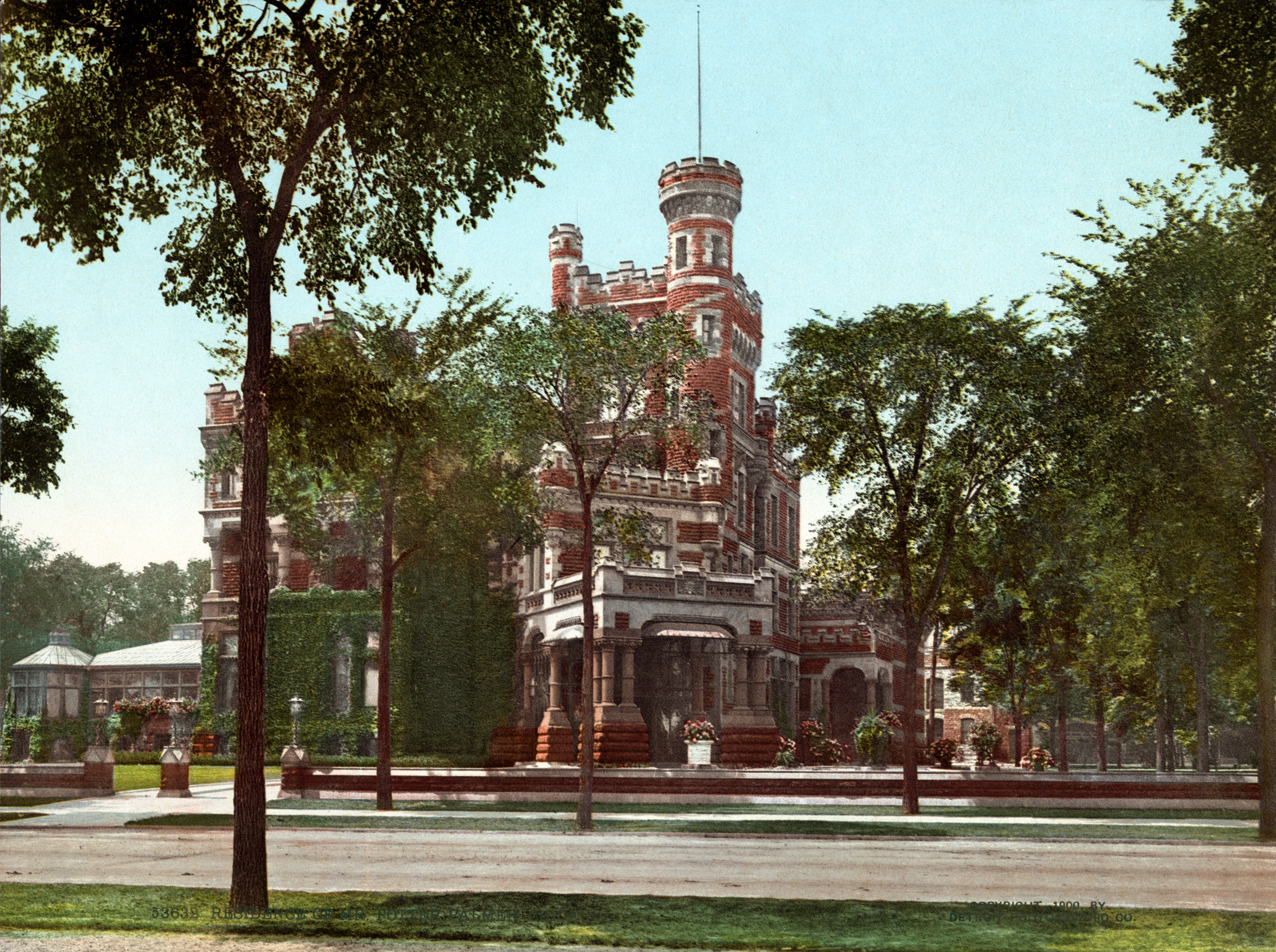
Palmer spent vast sums on the Palmer Mansion.

Bertha Palmer was famous for her free-spending ways. Her husband indulged her and did not mind that she was in the limelight. Her jewelry was legendary. According to the author Aline B. Saarinen,

so fabulous were her jewels that a newspaper declared that when she appeared on the S.S. Kaiser Wilhelm der Grosse with a tiara of diamonds as large as lima beans, a corsage panned with diamonds, a sunburst as big as a baseball, a stomacher of diamonds and all the pearls around her neck, Alois Burgskeller of the Metropolitan Opera, who was singing at the ship's concert, was stopped right in the middle of a high note.

She traveled throughout Europe, dining with kings and queens and mixing with industrialists and statesmen.

Vast sums were spent on the Palmer Mansion in Chicago, starting with $100,000 and rising over $1 million. Potter Palmer dictated in his will that a sum of money should go to whoever next married Bertha. When asked why he would be so generous to his own replacement, he replied, "Because he'll need it."

According to her son Potter II, Palmer was always known for her looks and the luxury that accompanied her. "'Before my mother became enamored with Florida, she had long been acknowledged as the fashionable queen of Chicago. Noted for her beauty, her wit, her fabulous pearls and diamonds, and the enormous Gothic Palmer Castle. Of her jewels, father would say, 'There she stands with $200,000 just around her neck.'"

She also maintained homes in London and Paris and, following her husband's death in 1902, rumors abounded that she would marry a titled man. Among the suspected suitors were the earl of Munster, the duke of Atholl, the prince of Monaco, and the king of Serbia. However, these rumors all proved to be unfounded when she remained unmarried.

In September 1907, Bertha Palmer and her son Potter II took part in the maiden voyage of the new Cunard liner RMS Lusitania from Liverpool to New York.

== Florida real estate pioneer ==
Bertha Palmer became interested in the winter climate of Florida and in 1910 bought over 80,000 acres of land in and around Sarasota, Florida—about one-third of the land in what was then the massive county named Manatee. In 1914, she bought 19,000 acres (77 km^{2}) of land as an exclusive hunting preserve called "River Hills" in Temple Terrace, Florida. After her death, her sons inherited the land and eventually sold it to developers who created the Mediterranean Revival golf course community of Temple Terrace, Florida.

She became a progressive rancher, land developer, and farm developer who introduced many innovations to encourage the Florida ranching, citrus, dairy, and row-crop farming industries. Palmer was one of the first famous people to winter in Florida, beginning a now-common practice. She encouraged wealthy friends and associates in her international social circles to spend winters along Sarasota Bay and her other Florida land interests and promoted the development of many land parcels; today much of that land is still known as Palmer Ranch. The major roads through her property, as well as some connecting to the existing communities, were named by her. Those names remain unchanged as Honoré, Lockwood Ridge, Tuttle, Webber, and McIntosh. Today's Palmer Blvd. in Fruitville runs through the former Palmer Farms made possible by the efforts of her sons to create the Sarasota-Fruitville Drainage District in the 1920s which is now home to the Celery Fields Stormwater Facility.

She proved herself to be an astute businesswoman: within sixteen years after her husband's death, she managed to double the value of the estate he had left her. After her death, a large parcel of her land was donated (donated according to Sarasota County, sold according to the state) by her sons to become Myakka River State Park.

Her grandson Potter D'Orsay Palmer (1908–39) became a notorious playboy who married four times and died after a brawl in Sarasota. His and Bertha's legacy are recounted in Frank A Cassell's book Suncoast Empire.

== Death ==
Palmer died of breast cancer on May 5, 1918, at her winter residence, The Oaks, in Osprey, Florida. Her body was returned to Chicago to lie in state at the Castle, the sumptuous mansion Potter Palmer had built on Chicago's Gold Coast. Bertha Palmer is buried alongside her husband in Graceland Cemetery.

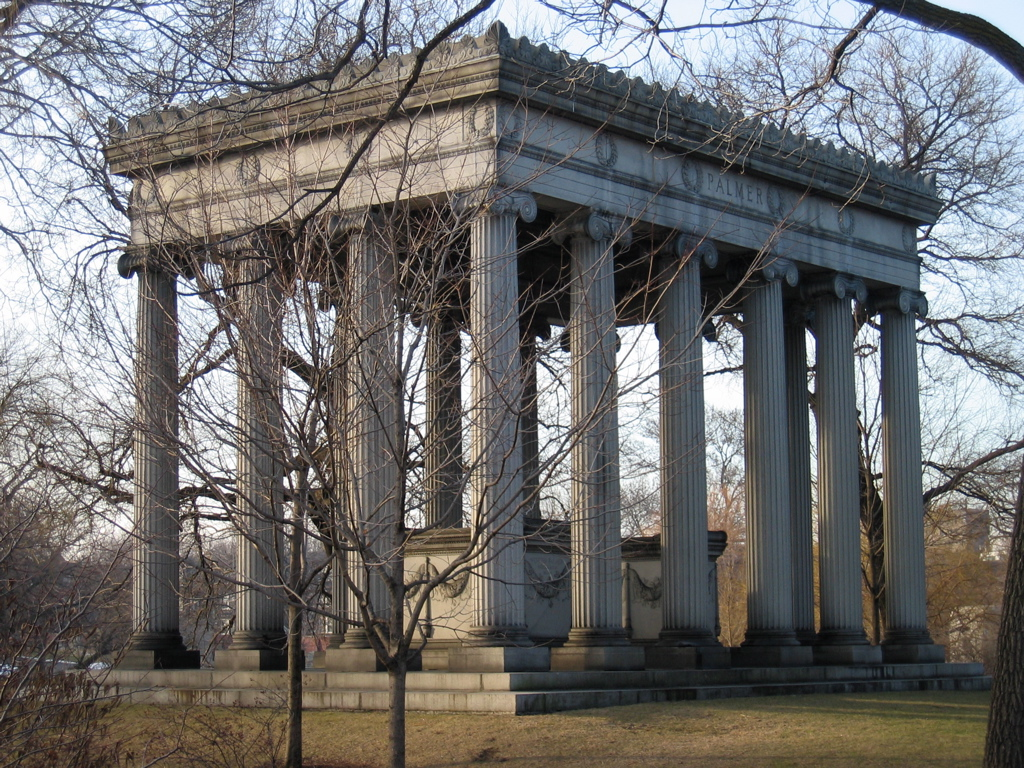
Bertha and Potter Palmer's burial site located in Graceland Cemetery.

== Legacy ==
Bertha Palmer's legacy can still be seen around Chicago today. The Palmer House still stands on Monroe street, selling Bertha Palmer's brownie recipe, as well as a park named after her; Honoré Palmer (Bertha) Park, located on Honoré St. in East Village. Her art collection is still on display in the impressionist wing at the Art Institute Chicago. The documentary Love Under Fire: The Story of Bertha and Potter Palmer premiered on PBS in 2013.

== Book, thesis and essay references ==
- David Nolan, Fifty Feet in Paradise: The Booming of Florida. Harcourt Brace Jovanovich, 1984.
- Sally Webster,Eve's Daughter/Modern Woman: A Mural by Mary Cassatt, University of Illinois Press, 2004
- Letters in the Musee Rodin, Paris between Sarah Tyson Hallowell and Rodin, also between Bertha Palmer and Rodin
- Aline Saarinen, Proud Possessors, Conde Nast, 1958
- Jeffrey Morseburg, The Indefatigable Miss Hallowell, Biographical Essay, 2010
- Kirsten M. Jensen, Her Sex Was an Insuperable Objection: Sara Tyson Hallowell and the Art Institute of Chicago, MA Thesis, Southern Connecticut State University, 2000
- Hope Black, Mounted on a Pedestal:Bertha Honoré Palmer, Master's Thesis, University of South Florida, 2007
- Ishbel Ross,Silhouette of Diamonds: The Life of Mrs. Potter Palmer,1984
