= Potter Palmer =

American businessman

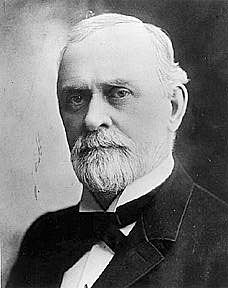
- Born: May 26, 1826; Albany County, New York, US
- Died: May 4, 1902 (aged 75); Chicago, Illinois, US
- Burial place: Graceland Cemetery, Chicago
- Occupations: Businessman, developer
- Spouse: Bertha Honoré (m. 1870)
- Children: 2 sons

Potter Palmer (May 26, 1826 – May 4, 1902) was an American businessman who was responsible for much of the development of State Street in Chicago. Born in Albany County, New York, he was the fourth son of Benjamin and Rebecca (Potter) Palmer.

== Early life and career ==
Potter Palmer was born in Potter's Hollow, Albany County, New York, to Benjamin and Rebecca (Potter) Palmer, the fourth of seven children. He grew up in a Quaker community and attended Friends Academy in nearby Rensselaerville for two years. Although his father owned four dairy farms, Palmer chose to pursue a career in commerce.

Through his uncle Samuel P. Potter, Palmer obtained employment as a clerk in the general store of Colonel Platt Adams in Durham, New York. As Adams became increasingly occupied with other business and political activities, Palmer assumed responsibility for the store, as well as Adams's banking operations and the local post office. In 1848, after approximately three years of employment, Adams offered Palmer a partnership, which he declined in order to establish his own business.

With financial assistance from his father, Palmer opened a general store in Oneida County, New York, in 1848. Influenced by his Quaker upbringing, he adopted a policy of fixed prices and cash sales. The business struggled, and after approximately two years he relocated to Lockport, New York, where he opened a dry-goods store on Main Street. There he continued to employ fixed pricing, but again encountered limited commercial success.

In 1852, after learning of Chicago's rapid commercial expansion through a limestone order placed with Lockport quarries, Palmer visited the city to investigate its business prospects. He decided to relocate, sold his Lockport store, and secured financial support from his father. He subsequently traveled to New York City to purchase merchandise for his new Chicago establishment.

== Retailing career ==
Potter Palmer founded a dry goods store, Potter Palmer and Company, on Lake Street in Chicago in 1852. Unlike many stores of the time it focused on women and encouraged their patronage. Palmer instituted a "no questions asked" returns policy and allowed customers to take goods home to inspect before purchasing, which served to nurture the goodwill and patronage of Chicagoans. He made the store much larger and more distinctive than other stores of the time. Palmer was the first owner to advertise with large window displays that included price comparisons.

When Palmer's doctor urged him to get out of the business in 1865 because of ill health, he brought in partners Marshall Field and Levi Leiter. The trio joined forces and renamed the firm Field, Palmer, Leiter and Company. The store would eventually develop into the prominent Midwestern department store chain Marshall Field and Company.

== Real estate career ==
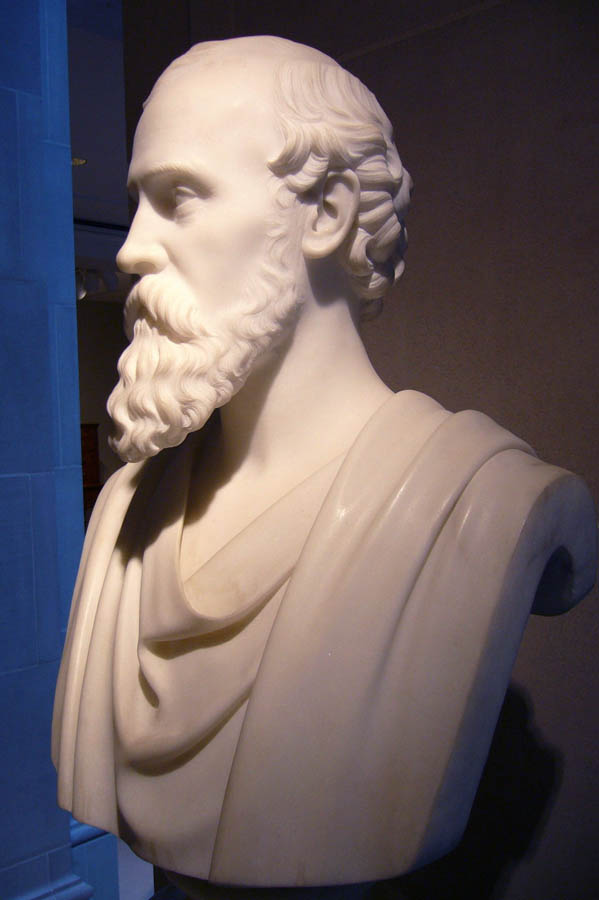
Bust of Potter Palmer by Hiram Powers, 1871 (Art Institute of Chicago)

In January 1865, Palmer sold his dry-goods business to Field and Leiter at 20 percent below its inventory value, while leaving $330,000 invested in the firm and remaining a silent partner. He subsequently traveled to Europe, returning after approximately three months rather than the three years he had originally planned.

Palmer then turned his attention to real estate, particularly State Street, which he believed would replace Lake Street as Chicago's principal shopping district. Lake Street, then the city's commercial center, had become increasingly crowded with warehouses, street vendors, fishmongers, and waterfront traffic. Its proximity to the Chicago River also exposed shoppers to unpleasant odors. Palmer believed that Lake Street was approaching the limits of its commercial development and that State Street offered greater opportunities for expansion.

Palmer gradually acquired properties along State Street, purchasing small shops, boardinghouses, saloons, and other buildings. He encouraged neighboring property owners to move their buildings back from the street to allow for its widening, although many initially resisted. At the time, his holdings were estimated at $2.5 million in cash and securities, together with an equivalent amount in government bonds.

Among Palmer's principal developments were the Palmer House Hotel, planned as an eight-story building with 225 rooms at an estimated cost of $300,000, and a six-story commercial building at the corner of State and Washington streets. The latter, constructed of limestone and marble and featuring Corinthian columns, was estimated to cost $350,000. Together with his other land acquisitions, these projects represented an investment of approximately $2 million.

Palmer persuaded Field and Leiter to relocate their expanding dry-goods business from Lake Street to the new building, charging an annual rent of $50,000. Construction continued through the spring and summer of 1868, and the store opened to the public on October 12, 1868. Known as Palmer's Marble Palace, it contained steam-powered elevators, including freight elevators described as capable of carrying a three-ton safe. The opening attracted considerable public attention and helped establish State Street as Chicago's emerging retail center.

Palmer continued developing properties along State Street, including the Palmer House Hotel. Following the destruction of many of his buildings in the Great Chicago Fire of 1871, he borrowed $1.7 million to finance reconstruction, reportedly the largest loan made to a private individual up to that time. He also undertook the reclamation and development of land north of Chicago's commercial district, contributing to the development of Lake Shore Drive.

== Personal life ==
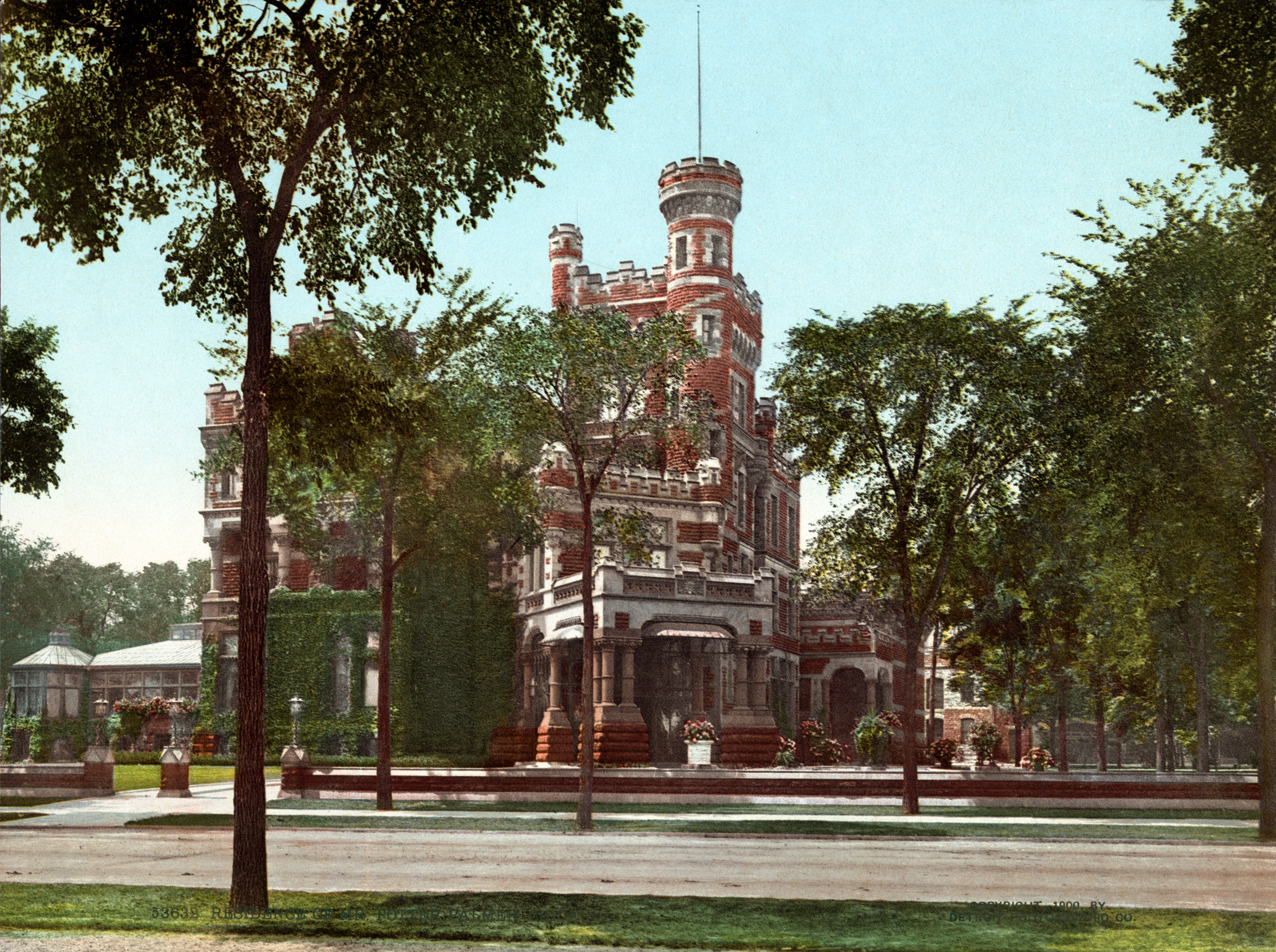
Photochrom print of Palmer Mansion in 1900

In 1871, he married Bertha Mathilde Honoré. In 1874 a son, Honoré, was born; in 1875, Potter Palmer II. Both went on to have sons named Potter Palmer III, as well as other children.

In 1885 Palmer built the castle-like Palmer Mansion on Lake Shore Drive, leading to the establishment of the Gold Coast. Prior to that time, Prairie Avenue had been the most desirable address in Chicago.

Palmer is buried in Graceland Cemetery in the north side neighborhood known today as Uptown, Chicago.
