= Palmer Mansion =

Demolished mansion in Chicago, Illinois

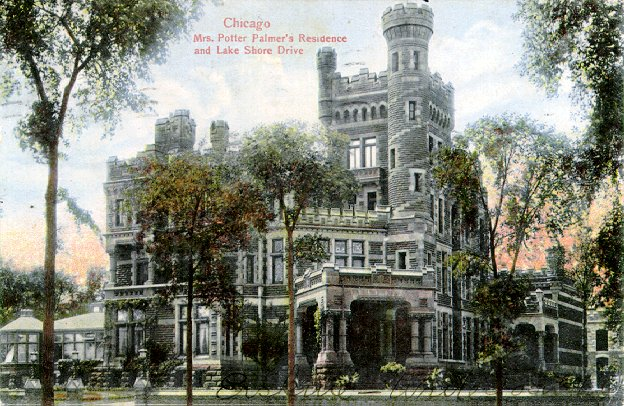
- The front façade, c. 1910
- Interactive map of the Palmer Mansion area

General information
- Architectural style: Early Romanesque, Norman Gothic
- Location: Chicago, Illinois, United States
- Coordinates: 41.907324°N 87.626615°W
- Construction started: 1882
- Completed: 1885
- Demolished: 1950
- Cost: at least $1,000,000
- Client: Bertha and Potter Palmer

Technical details
- Size: 10,000 sqft (estimated)

Design and construction
- Architects: Henry Ives Cobb and Charles Sumner Frost
- Engineer: John Newquist

The Palmer Mansion was a large private home constructed 1882–1885 at 1350 N. Lake Shore Drive, Chicago, Illinois. Once the largest private residence in the city, it was located in the Near North Side neighborhood, facing Lake Michigan. It was designed by architects Henry Ives Cobb and Charles Sumner Frost of the firm Cobb and Frost and built for Bertha and Potter Palmer, a local businessman responsible for much of the development of State Street. The construction of the mansion established the "Gold Coast" neighborhood, still one of the most affluent neighborhoods in Chicago. The home was demolished in 1950.

== History ==
=== Construction ===
At the time of the construction of the mansion, Potter Palmer was already responsible for much of the development of State Street. After the Great Chicago Fire of 1871, the buildings on State Street were destroyed, and Palmer was yet again responsible for its redevelopment. Construction on the mansion began in 1882, and its exterior work was completed in 1883. However, interior decoration continued for another two years before the building was entirely complete.

Henry Ives Cobb and Charles Frost were chosen as the architects for the mansion. The interiors were completed under the direction of architect Joseph Lyman Silsbee. John Newquist, who had already worked with Palmer on numerous other constructions, was chosen as the contractor and stair constructor. Although it was originally budgeted at $90,000, after five years of construction, the mansion cost the Palmers more than a million dollars.

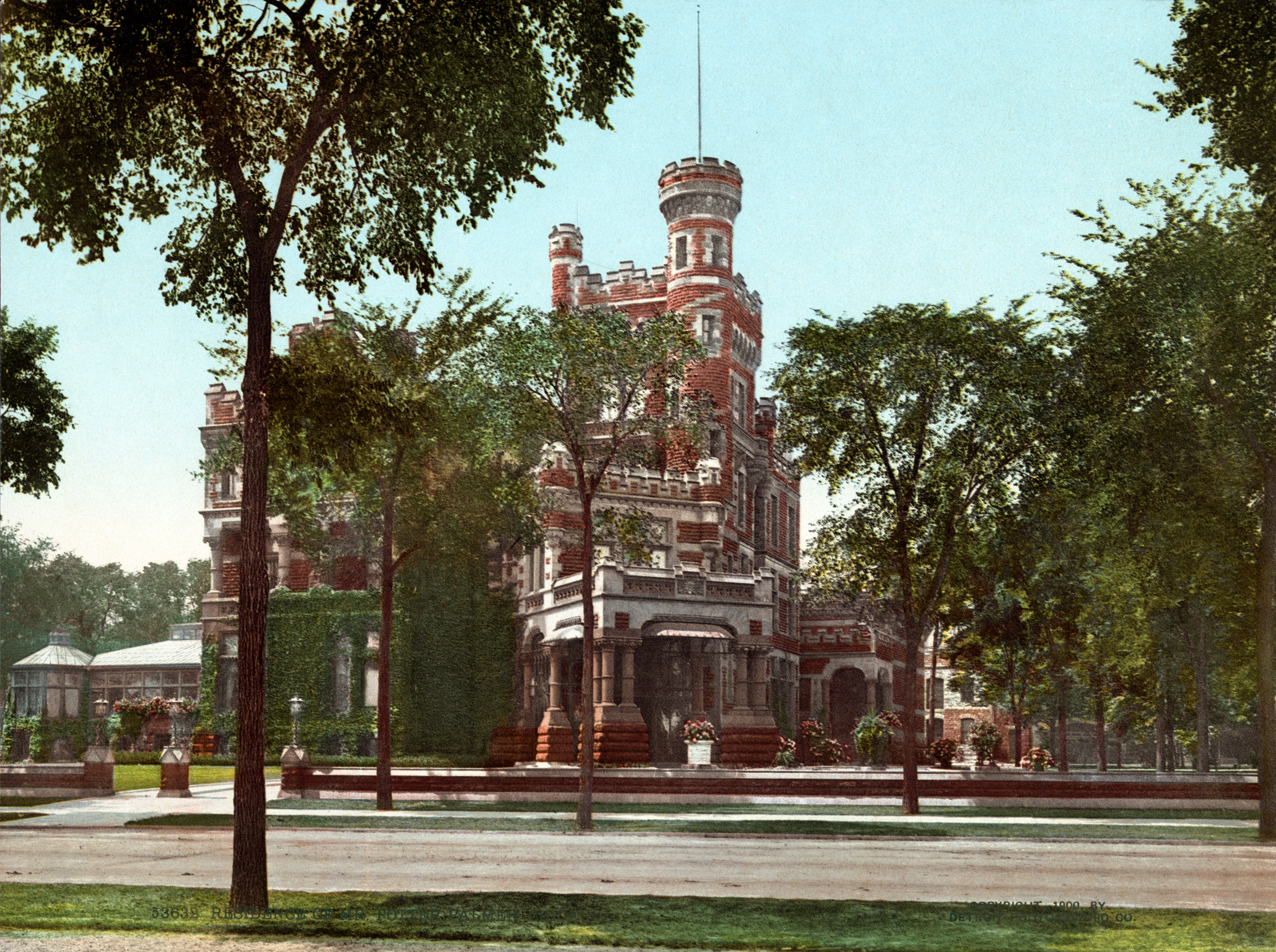
Arthur Meeker, Jr. called the mansion a "liver-colored goldfish castle". Photochrom print, 1900.

The Palmer Mansion was used for many social gatherings, including entertaining former U.S. President Ulysses S. Grant, during his visit to the city, and receptions during the 1893 World's Columbian Exposition for which Bertha Palmer was a major planner and booster. The Palmers also received many other guests, including: two other U. S. Presidents, James A. Garfield, though not at the Palmer Mansion if it was constructed in 1882–1883 as he was assassinated in 1881, and William McKinley; the Duke and Duchess of Veragua; the Prince of Wales, later to become King Edward VII; as well as the Spanish princess Infanta Eulalia.

=== Later ownership and demolition ===
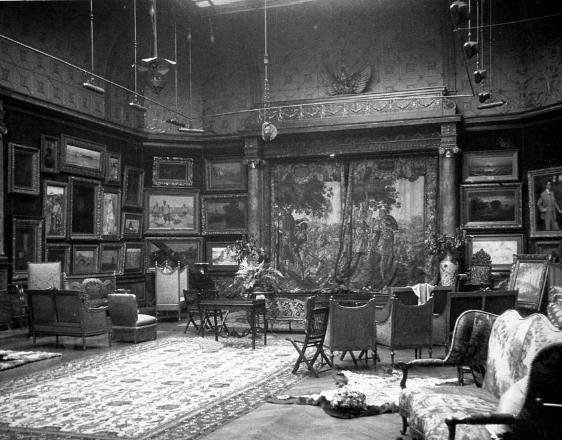
Bertha Palmer's large collection of paintings included works by Claude Monet, Edgar Degas, Pierre-Auguste Renoir, and Pablo Picasso.

When Potter Palmer died in the mansion in 1902, he left his wife with a fortune of $8,000,000 (equivalent to about $298 million today). After his death, Bertha Palmer continued to reside in the house, as well as in homes she maintained in London and Paris, until she died at her winter residence in Osprey, Florida. She invested heavily in real estate in Florida where she developed farms, dairies, and cattle ranches that she administered herself.

With these great investments in land, she parleyed the fortune into almost double what she had been left and, in 1918, bequeathed an estate of $15,000,000 to her sons Honoré and Potter Palmer Jr. They sold the Chicago mansion in July 1928, for $3,000,000, to the industrialist Vincent Hugo Bendix, who had invented an automobile starter. Potter Palmer Jr. and his wife vacated the property in April 1930.

Bendix renamed the property "The Bendix Galleries", after adding paintings by Rembrandt and Howard Chandler Christy to Bertha Palmer's former art collection. While residing within the mansion, he modernized the elevator, and installed a barber's chair for his own use.

Vincent Bendix contemplated razing the mansion to construct a fifty-story hotel on the site, at an estimated cost of $25,000,000. However, the project was never put into action, and the property was sold to Potter Palmer's son in 1933 for $2,000,000, the amount of the building's mortgage. The mansion stood vacant for years until it was demolished in 1950, to be replaced by two 22-story high-rise apartment buildings housing 740 families.

The mansion's painting gallery, including works by French painters Claude Monet, Pierre-Auguste Renoir, and Edgar Degas that were collected by Bertha Palmer, was transferred to the Art Institute of Chicago, and the furniture was sold.

== Architecture ==
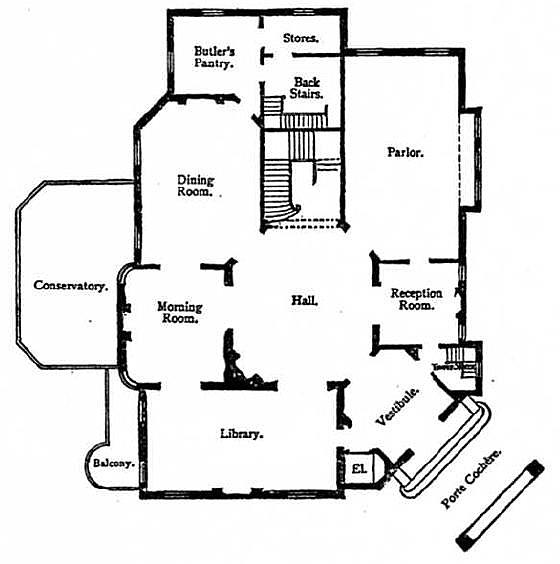
The Palmer Mansion's first floor plan.

The Palmer Mansion was designed by architects Henry Ives Cobb and Charles Sumner Frost, with the lavish interiors executed under the supervision of Joseph Lyman Silsbee. The architects referred to its architectural style as Early Romanesque or Norman Gothic. Alternatively, the mansion was supposedly based on a German castle.

The mansion featured a three-story Italianate central hall under a glass dome. Other rooms were finished in a variety of historic styles: a Louis XVI salon, an Indian room, an Ottoman parlor, a Renaissance library, a Spanish music room, an English dining room that could seat fifty, and a Moorish room, the rugs of which were impregnated with rare perfumes. A collection of paintings, collected by Bertha Palmer, adorned the mansion's grand ballroom, 75-foot (22.9 m) long. The room's murals in the frieze above them were by Gabriel Ferrier.

The mansion's exterior included many turrets and minarets, and on the interior, a spiral staircase without a center support, rising 80 feet (24.4 m) into the central tower. Two elevators also served the building. The Palmers constructed their mansion's outside doors specifically without locks and knobs so that the only way to get in was to be admitted from the inside.

== See also ==
- Chicago architecture
- Palmer House Hotel
