= Loraine Immen =

American philanthropist, elocutionist, writer, club leader

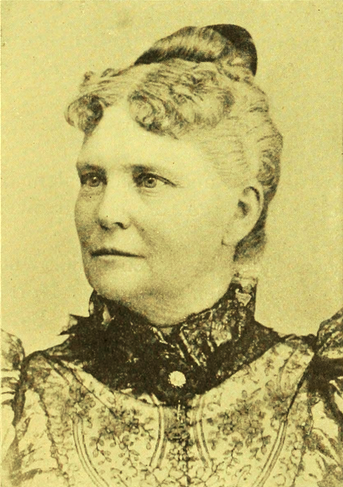
- (1898)
- Born: Loraine Pratt; August 3, 1840; Mount Clemens, Michigan, U.S.
- Died: October 21, 1927 (aged 87)
- Education: National School of Elocution and Oratory
- Occupations: philanthropist; elocutionist; author; clubwoman
- Spouse: Frederick Immen (m. 1860)
- Children: 2
- Relatives: James Cook

Loraine Immen (née, Pratt; August 3, 1840 – October 21, 1927) was an American philanthropist, elocutionist, author, and social leader. She was a life fellow of the Society of Science, Letters and Art. Immen was one of the most active and best known clubwomen in Michigan. She was the inspiring prime mover and first president of the Grand Rapids City Federation of Women's Clubs.

== Early life and education ==
Loraine Pratt was born in Mount Clemens, Michigan, August 3, 1840. Her mother's maiden name was Cook, and her ancestors were related to Captain James Cook. Her father, E. G. Pratt, was a native of Massachusetts, who settled in Michigan in the pioneer days, making his home in Mount Clemens. He was conspicuous in every movement that had for its object the development of the community and the State.

The two daughters of the Pratt family enjoyed the advantages of a thorough education.

== Career ==
Loraine became a teacher at the age of fourteen years, and she succeeded well in the arduous work of the schoolroom. She taught in Mount Clemens until 1860.

In 1860, she married Frederick Immen. They had two sons, one dying at the age of 20, and the other while an infant.

She continued her studies after marriage, and in 1880, she was graduated and received the first honor in a senior class contest of the National School of Elocution and Oratory in Philadelphia, Pennsylvania.

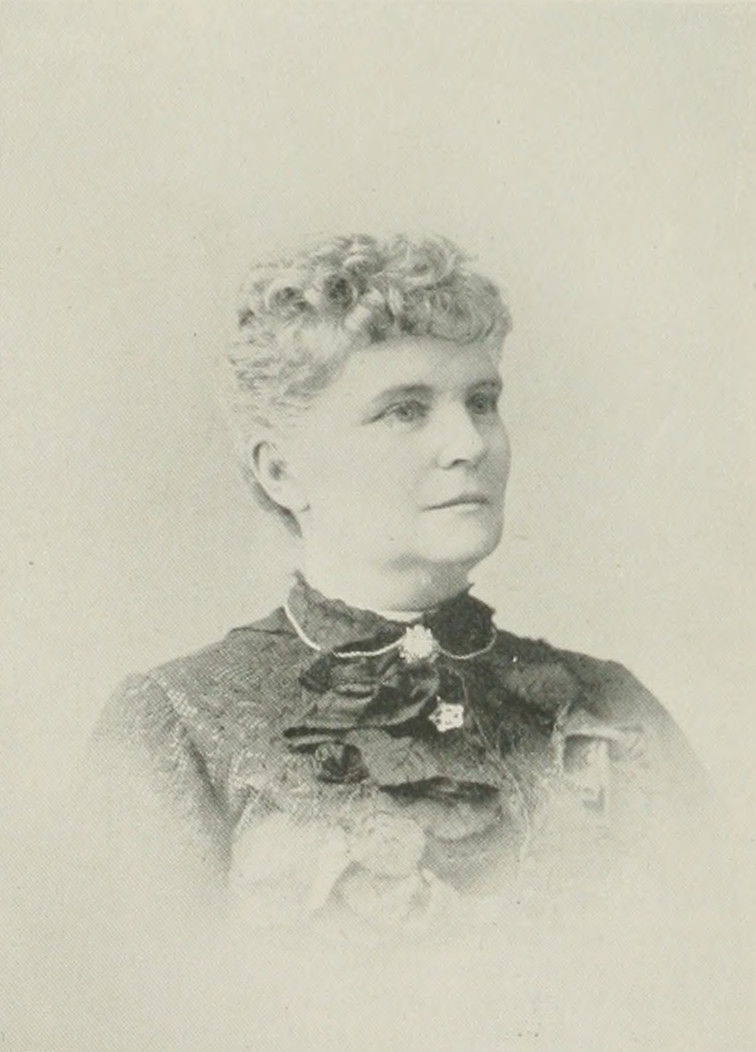
Portrait from A Woman of the Century

Returning to her home, she gave a public reading in the Mount Clemens opera house, giving the proceeds of the entertainment for the beginning of a fund to purchase a town clock. Appearing as a lecturer in Grand Rapids, Michigan, her subject was "Paris," and the proceeds she gave to aid in erecting the soldier's monumental fountain in that city. Later, while in London, she gave readings and was made a life fellow of the Society of Science, Letters and Art.

In Grand Rapids, Immen was the founder of the Shakespeare Club and was its president from the beginning. She was connected with the St. Cecilia Society and the Ladies' Literary Club since their institution, and in 1890, she was president of the latter club, a society that numbered over 500 members at the time. The Ladies' Literary Club, in Grand Rapids, was a monument to Immen's enthusiasm, industry, and executive ability. In 1887, she and the other leaders of the club purchased a site for a clubhouse, and a building was finished and dedicated in January 1888. It became the center of intellectual activity among the women of Grand Rapids, focused on art, literature, history, science and education.

Immen served as a director of the National Association of Elocutionists (1895). That year, during the founding of the Michigan State Federation of Women's Clubs, Immen was elected corresponding secretary. In 1896, when the Grand Rapids City Federation of Women's Clubs was founded, Immen was elected as its first president. She was also made honorary president of The Alsbice Club.

Besides her work in literary, elocutionary and social lines, she was an earnest worker in the Sunday school.

== Death and legacy ==
In her lifetime, Immen presented several gifts to the city of Grand Rapids including a bust of Henry Wadsworth Longfellow in Fulton Park and a bust of Abraham Lincoln in Lincoln Place, as well as a drinking fountain in Monument Park and one in Fulton Park.

Loraine Pratt Immen died on October 21, 1927.

The Loraine Pratt Immen collection is held by the Grand Rapids Public Library's Grand Rapids History Center Repository.

== Selected works ==
- Letters of Travel in California, in the Winter and Spring of 1896, 1896 (text)
- Timon of Athens, 1897 (text)
- Art's Tribute to Shakespeare, 1900 (text)
- Cordelia in Drama of King Lear, 1908 (text)
- Shakespeare: Casket Story (from Merchant of Venice), 1915 (text)
- The Story of Park Congregational Church and Its Windows, 1916 (text)
- Shoemaker's Best Selections for Readings and Recitations, Issue 22, 1927 (text)
