= Grant DePorter =

American businessman

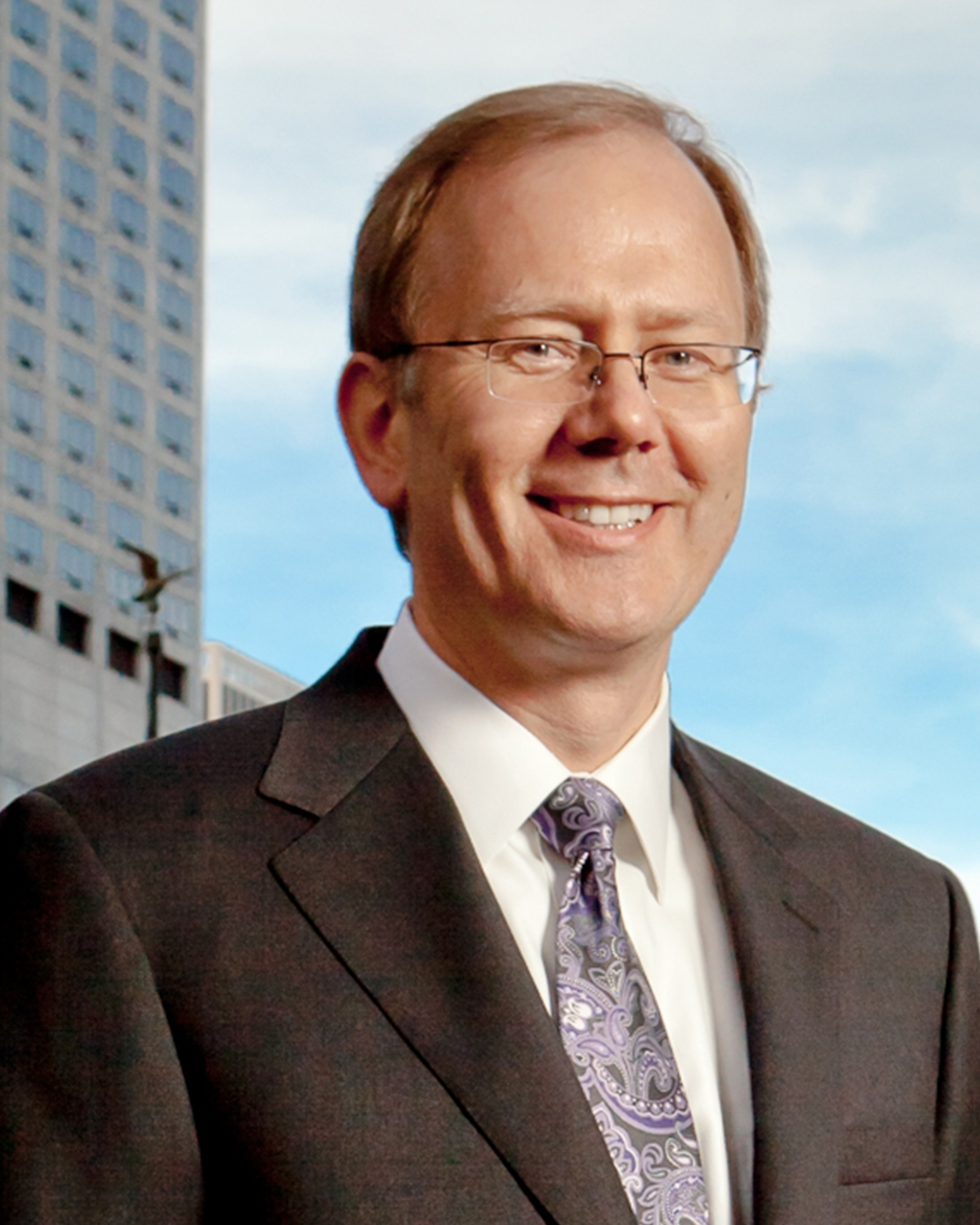
- Grant DePorter on Michigan Avenue
- Born: November 7, 1964 (age 61); Seattle, Washington
- Education: Duke University Fuqua School of Business (MBA); Cornell University
- Occupation: CEO of Harry Caray's Restaurant Group
- Spouse: Joanna DePorter
- Children: Hayden DePorter (1995); Margo DePorter (1995)
- Parent(s): Donald DePorter (1942-1996), Bobbi DePorter (1944)
- Website: www.harrycarays.com

Grant M. DePorter (born November 7, 1964) is a restaurateur from Chicago, U.S., who came to prominence in 2004 after he paid US$113,824.16 for a baseball which had played a role in the Chicago Cubs defeat in the 2003 National League Championship Series, and had the ball destroyed in a nationally televised event. The event was an attempt to end the "Curse of the Billy Goat" – which has supposedly prevented the Cubs from winning the National League since 1945 and also helped raise a substantial amount of money for diabetes research.

== Career ==
DePorter has worked in, managed or owned over thirty restaurants. He is the President and Managing Partner of Harry Caray's Restaurant Group, which owns seven restaurants, the best-known being Harry Caray's Italian Steakhouse in the Chicago area (named after the late Hall of Fame baseball announcer Harry Caray). The restaurants have won several awards, including been voted the best steakhouse in Chicago and the best sports restaurant in the United States.

== Cubs ==
In October 2003, the Cubs had a built up a commanding lead in the NLCS for the National League title against the Florida Marlins. But during Game 6 of the series, with the Cubs leading 3–0, a home fan, Steve Bartman, unwittingly deflected a vital catch out of the hand of Cubs outfielder Moisés Alou. Following this the Marlins rallied, winning not only the game but the league and, eventually, the 2003 World Series. Many Cubs fans viewed this as a continuation of the "Curse of the Billy Goat", which had hung over the team since 1945, when the owner of the local Billy Goat Tavern was prevented from bringing his beloved pet goat into the Cubs' home stadium, Wrigley Field, and thus swore that the Cubs would never again win the National League Championship. DePorter paid $113,824.16 for the infamous "foul ball" in order to destroy it, and thus hopefully to put an end to the curse.

DePorter predicted the Cubs would win the 2016 World Series due to the Cubs' Magic Number 108. DePorter's prediction was printed in the Chicago Sun-Times. He stated that the Cubs 108 year championship drought would end in 2016 due to the number 108 appearing everywhere. He stated that there are 108 stitches in a baseball which was created by the Cubs' first manager Albert Spalding whose office was at 108 West Madison Street, the left and right field foul poles at Wrigley Field are 108 meters from home plate and the movie Back to the Future Part II, which predicted the Cubs would win the World Series, is 108 minutes long. DePorter listed many 108s and while attending the Cubs first playoff game against the San Francisco Giants predicted that Javier Báez would hit a home run on pitch number 108. DePorter video taped that moment. USA Today put DePorter's called shot 108 story on the cover of the paper. The 108 signs continued throughout the Cubs World Series run. The most pitches thrown by a Cubs player during the post season was 108 by Jon Lester and the biggest home run, Addison Russell's World Series Game 6 Grand Slam, went 108 mph. When the Cubs won the World Series, Joe Maddon lifted the World Series trophy for the first time at 1:08 AM.
