= Garfield Building (Cleveland) =

Coordinates: 41°30′1″N 81°41′21″W

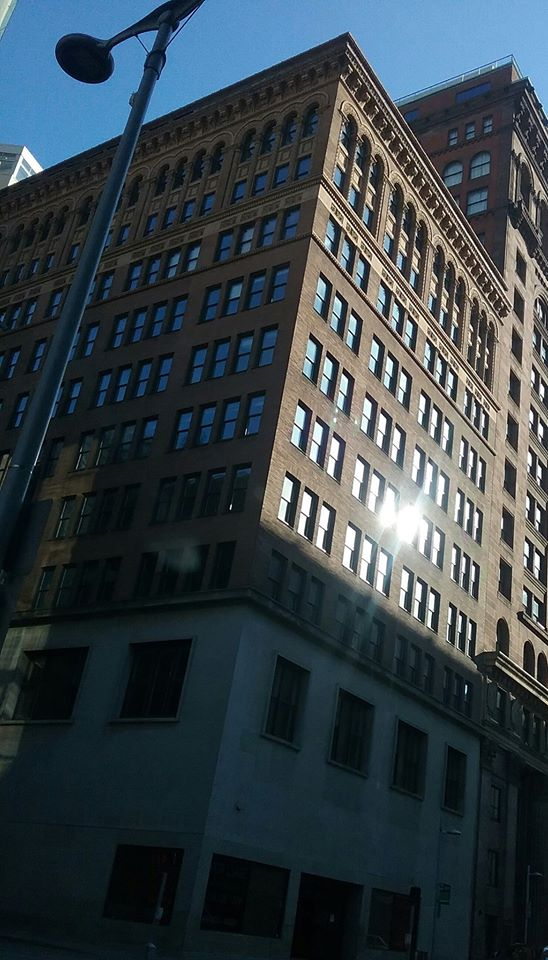
- Interactive map of the Garfield Building area
- Former names: Garfield Building

General information
- Type: Commercial/Residential Conversion
- Location: 1965 East Sixth Street, Cleveland, Ohio, U.S.
- Completed: 1893

Height
- Roof: 46 m (151 ft)

Technical details
- Floor count: 10

Design and construction
- Architect: Henry Ives Cobb

Website
- https://www.thegarfield.com

The Garfield Building is a high-rise building on the corner of Euclid Avenue and E. 6th Street in Cleveland, Ohio, in the United States. It was the first steel frame skyscraper constructed in the city.

== The original building ==
The edifice was designed by Henry Ives Cobb and built in 1893 by Harry Augustus Garfield and James Rudolph Garfield, sons of President James A. Garfield. The ten-story structure was the first steel frame office building erected in the city. The facade on E. 6th Street was 214 feet (65 m) long, taking up the entire block between Euclid and Vincent Avenues, but just 70 feet (21 m) on Euclid Avenue.

Patrons could access the upper floors via a large marble staircase or four elevators. All the upper floors featured Italian marble wainscoting.

A below-ground level was intended to serve as a bank, and several meeting rooms, banking parlors, and massive steel vaults were erected there during the building's construction at a cost of $100,000 ($3,600,000 in 2025 dollars). A customer for this space was not found until 1895, when the Cleveland Trust Company moved in. The building's major tenant was the local luxury jewelry firm of Cowell and Hubbard, which rented the entire first floor. In 1898, the Cleveland Trust Co. moved a portion of its operations onto the first floor, building "club rooms" for its male depositors to relax in while banking. and a "ladies' parlor" and tea room for its female patrons. (Note: National City Bank soon became the Garfield Building's biggest tenant. In 1900, the bank leased most of the building's second floor for its executive offices and trust business. In 1903, after National City absorbed the Western Reserve Trust Company, the executive offices and man's banking moved to a building on Cleveland's Public Square, while women's banking continued at the Garfield Building.)

== 1921 renovations ==
In 1918, National City Corp. (a bank) purchased the Garfield Building. (Note: Cowell & Hubbard moved out of the Garfield Building and to a newly-constructed edifice at Euclid Avenue and E. 13th Street.) The structure was renovated at a cost of $500,000 ($10,700,000 in 2025 dollars), converting the entire first floor into a marble-walled public banking room. The architectural firm of Graham, Anderson, Probst & White oversaw the renovation. The structure was renamed the National City Bank Building after the renovation was complete in 1921. National City Corp. suffered extremely heavy financial losses on mortgages during the 2007-2009 Great Recession. Despite a $7 billion infusion of capital, the bank was sold at below-market-value in October 2008. Westcore Properties acquired the building in 2008.

== 21st century renovations ==
Having sat vacant since 2009, the Garfield Building was purchased by Millennia Companies in April 2014, with plans to convert it into apartments. The Garfield attracted renewed attention in April 2015 after portions of the parapet fell onto the sidewalk and adjacent parked cars. The newly renovated apartments opened as the Garfield Apartments in the fall of 2017.

In 2017, the former public banking hall in the Garfield Building was converted into an upscale restaurant, the Marble Room. Ground floor office space adjacent to the hall was converted into a kitchen, and a small mezzanine constructed to provide space for a glass-walled wine cellar. The below-ground bank vaults were converted into banquet and private dining space.

== Bibliography ==
- Ayers, R. Wayne (2000). Cleveland and the Western Reserve in Vintage Postcards. Charleston, S.C.: Arcadia Publishing. ISBN 9780738507378.
- Chapple, Joe Mitchell (February 1907). "A Bank for All Ages". The National Magazine. pp. 531–534.
- Davies, William G. (July 1911). "Managing Buildings in Cleveland". Building Management. pp. 48–60.
- Fuller, F.R. (December 1904). "What An Advertising Trust Company Has Accomplished in Nine Years". Trust Companies. pp. 1096–1097.
- Gregor, Sharon (2010). Rockefeller's Cleveland. Charleston, S.C.: Arcadia Publishing. ISBN 9780738577111.
- Rose, William Ganson (1990). Cleveland: The Making of a City. Kent, Ohio: Kent State University Press. ISBN 9780873384285.
