= The Omni King Edward Hotel =

Historic luxury hotel in Downtown Toronto, Ontario, Canada

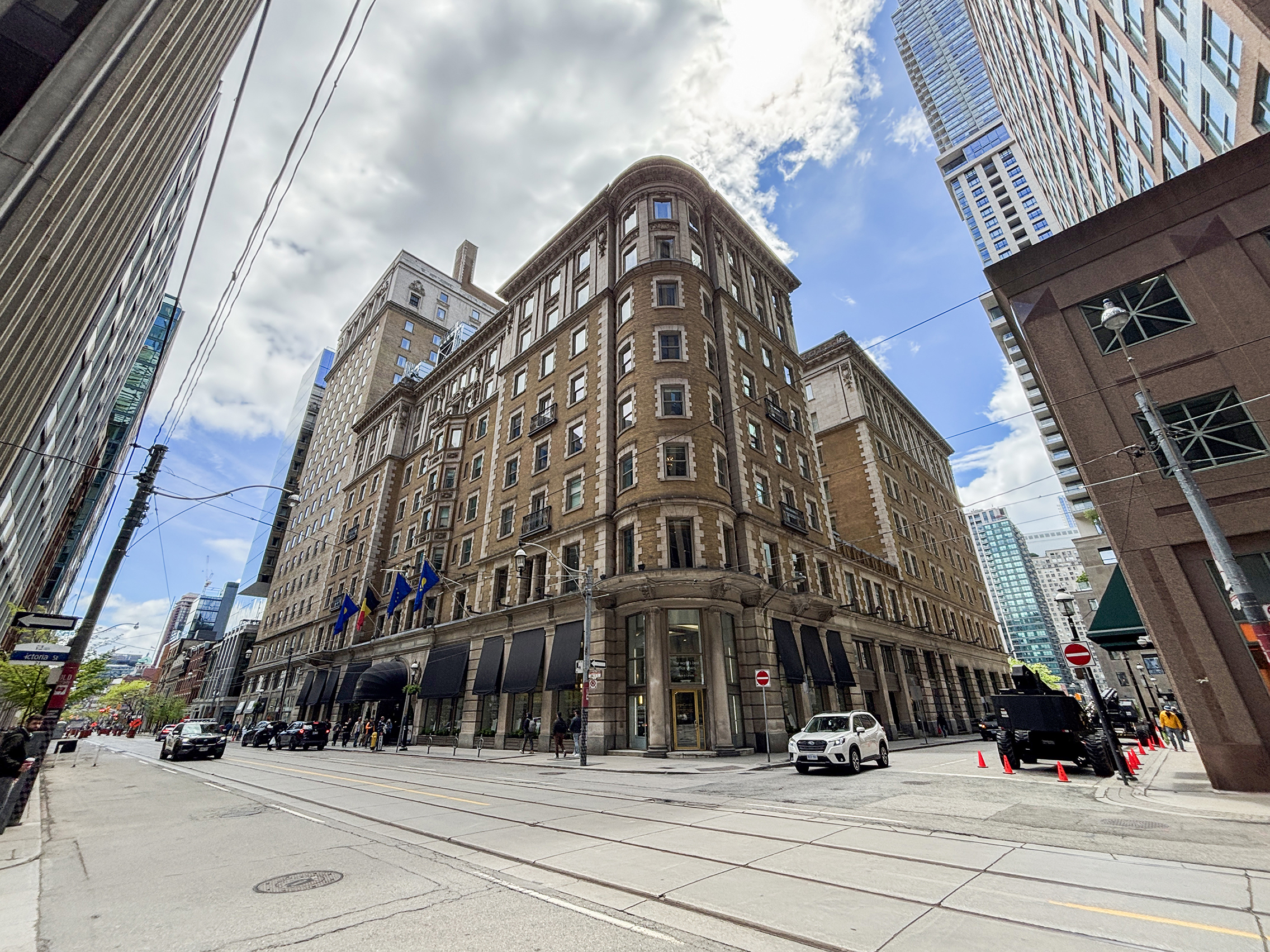
- The front entrance on King Street

- Location within Ontario

General information
- Location: 37 King Street East; Toronto, Ontario; M5C 1E9
- Coordinates: 43.6494°N 79.3766°W
- Opened: May 10, 1903
- Owner: Omni Hotels & Resorts
- Operator: Omni Hotels & Resorts

Height
- Height: 190 ft (58 m)

Technical details
- Floor count: 18 (no 13th floor)

Design and construction
- Architects: Henry Ives Cobb (tower); E.J. Lennox (original)
- Main contractor: Illsley & Horn, Ltd.

Other information
- Number of rooms: 301

Website
- www.omnihotels.com/hotels/toronto-king-edward

The OMNI King Edward Hotel, also known as the "King Eddy", is a historic luxury hotel in Downtown Toronto, Ontario, Canada. The hotel is located at 37 King Street East, and it occupies the entire block bounded by King Street on the north, Victoria Street on the east, Colborne Street on the south and Leader Lane on the west.

== History ==
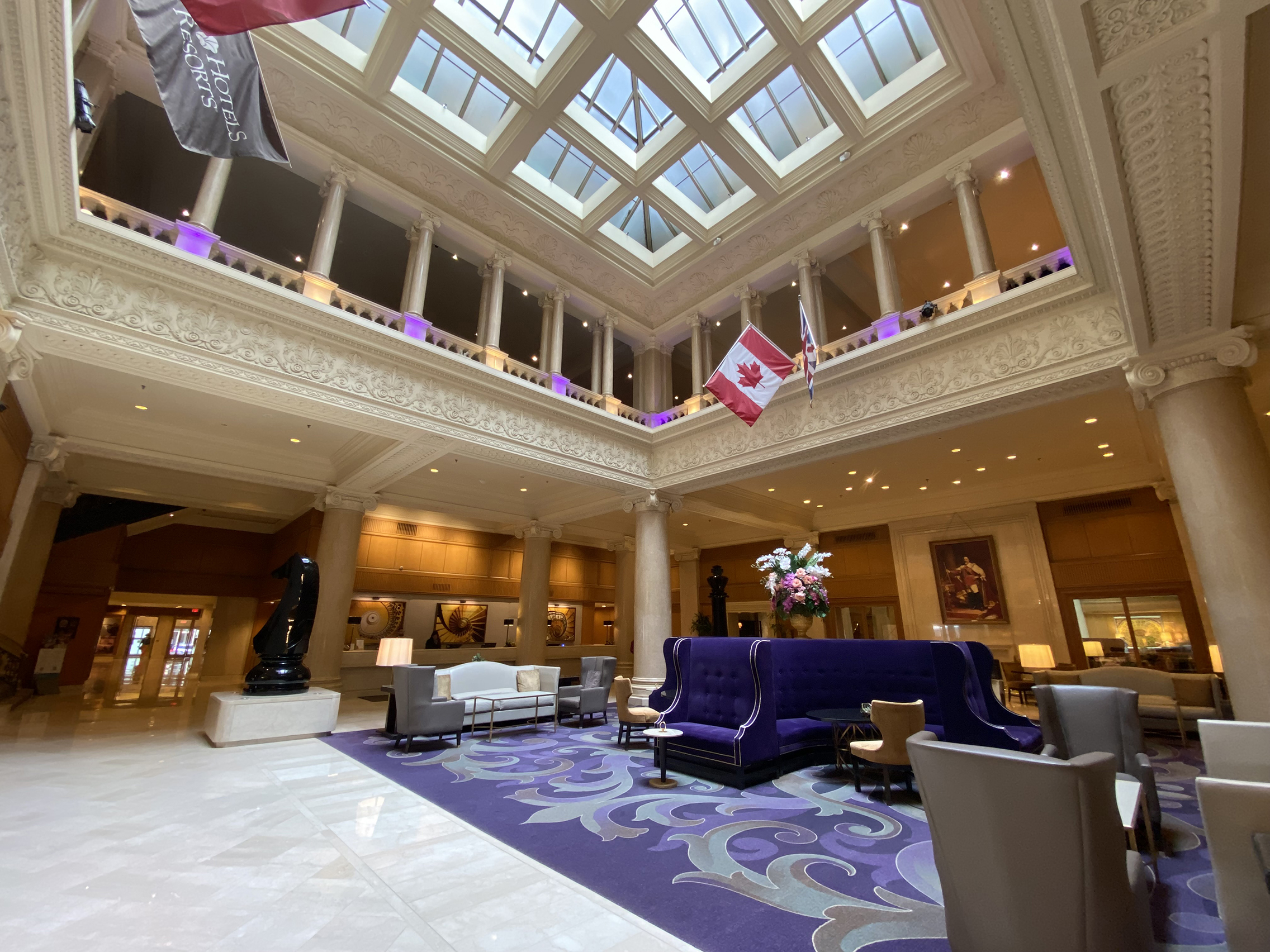
Hotel lobby

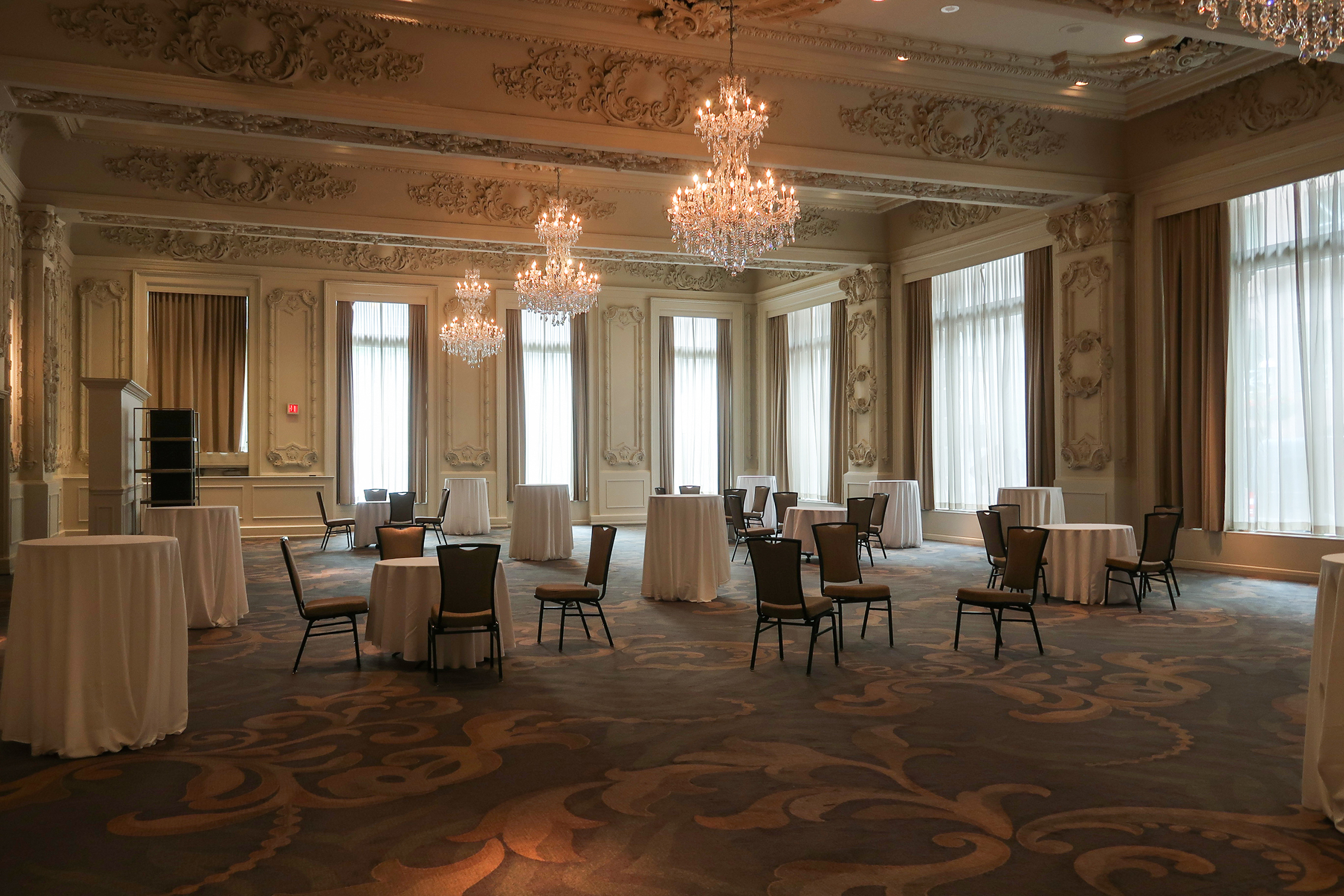
Sovereign Room

The King Edward Hotel was designed by Toronto architect E.J. Lennox for developer George Gooderham's Toronto Hotel Company, and was granted its name by namesake King Edward VII. Construction began in 1901, with the demolition of the Walker Building on the site. Built at a cost of CA$2,000,000 (equivalent to $75,162,501 in 2025), the hotel opened in 1903 with 400 rooms and 300 baths, and it claimed to be entirely fireproof.

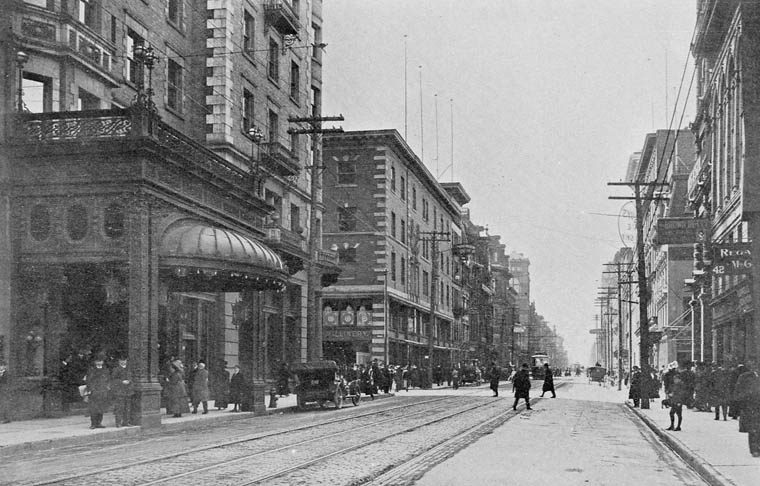
King Street in 1908, with the King Edward Hotel on the left

In 1921, an 18-storey tower, costing CA$2,500,000 (equivalent to $41,050,000 in 2025), designed by Chicago architect Henry Ives Cobb, with 530 additional rooms was added to the east of the original eight-storey structure, replacing the Sullivan Hotel on the site. On the two top floors of the tower is the Crystal Ballroom, that until the late 1950s was the most fashionable in the city. The room was closed in the late 1950s due to stricter fire codes and was not restored during the 1979-81 renovation. When the Omni Hotel chain invested in the hotel in 2013, restoring the ballroom was one of its announced goals. The ballroom re-opened in April 2017 after a closure of 38 years.

Throughout the years, the hotel has passed through the hands of a number of owners. The Metropolitan Life Insurance Company became owners in 1933 when it foreclosed on the mortgage. Between 1941 and 1950, the hotel passed between C. A. Ripley and Vernon Cardy. Cardy's Hotel chain also owned the Mount Royal Hotel in Montreal, the Royal Connaught Hotel in Hamilton, Ontario, the General Brock Hotel in Niagara Falls, the Prince Edward Hotel in Windsor, Ontario and the Alpine Inn in Sainte-Adèle, Quebec. In 1950, Sheraton purchased Cardy's hotels and assumed management of the property, renaming it The King Edward Sheraton.

The hotel dropped the Sheraton name in 1975, after the opening of the brand new Four Seasons Sheraton Hotel nearby, becoming the King Edward Hotel, but it remained part of Sheraton for another three years, until 1978. After a number of years of decline, it was bought by Trans Nation, Inc., a partnership of Emilio Valentini and John Franciotti, in 1979 for $6.3 million and closed on September 2, 1979, for a $30 million restoration designed by Stanford Downey Architects Inc. The property reopened May 7, 1981, as part of Trusthouse Forte Hotels, which bought the hotel outright on December 23 of that year. When Forte acquired Le Méridien hotels from Air France in 1994, the King Edward was rechristened Le Royal Méridien King Edward. The Le Méridien chain was involved in several other acquisitions and mergers between 1996 and 2003 when the brand came under the ownership of Lehman Brothers Holdings.

For the hotel's 100th anniversary, the Ontario Heritage Trust unveiled a commemorative plaque on May 8, 2003.

Starwood purchased the brand from Lehman in 2005 and the hotel was renamed, dropping Royal, to become simply Le Méridien King Edward. In 2009, a consortium purchased the structure but retained Le Méridien to manage it. The new owners announced a major restoration that included creating 140 condominiums on the third through fifth floors which had been unused for a number of years. In 2012, Skyline Hotels & Resorts, one of the owners, assumed management and marketing from Le Méridien and the hotel became The King Edward Hotel.

Omni Hotels assumed management on August 1, 2013, when the hotel was renamed The Omni King Edward Hotel. After managing the hotel for two years, Omni Hotels bought it outright on November 24, 2015.

== Guests ==
Notable dignitaries and luminaries who stayed at the hotel have included Rudolph Valentino, Louis Armstrong, Elvis Presley, Margaret Thatcher, Britney Spears, and Ernest Hemingway who had lived in the hotel for a period. The Beatles stayed at the hotel's royal suite during their first visit to Toronto, in 1964, and caused the hotel's biggest commotion to date, when 3,000 fans packed the streets and flooded the lobby. In 1969, John Lennon and Yoko Ono stayed in the same royal suite a day before their bed-in for peace began. In February 1964, "moralists picketed" when Liz Taylor and Richard Burton stayed in a suite together; they were not married to each other at the time, causing a scandal.

== In film ==
The King Edward has not only housed film stars but also film sets, from the mellow, Leonard Cohen’s 1983 musical I am a Hotel, to the melodramatic, Jamie Foxx’s film Bait, which, during a stunt mishap, caused an explosion that shook the building and shattered windows.

The hotel and the surrounding streets were used extensively in the filming of American Psycho. The opening scenes of The Boys season 4 took place at the hotel.

== Gallery ==
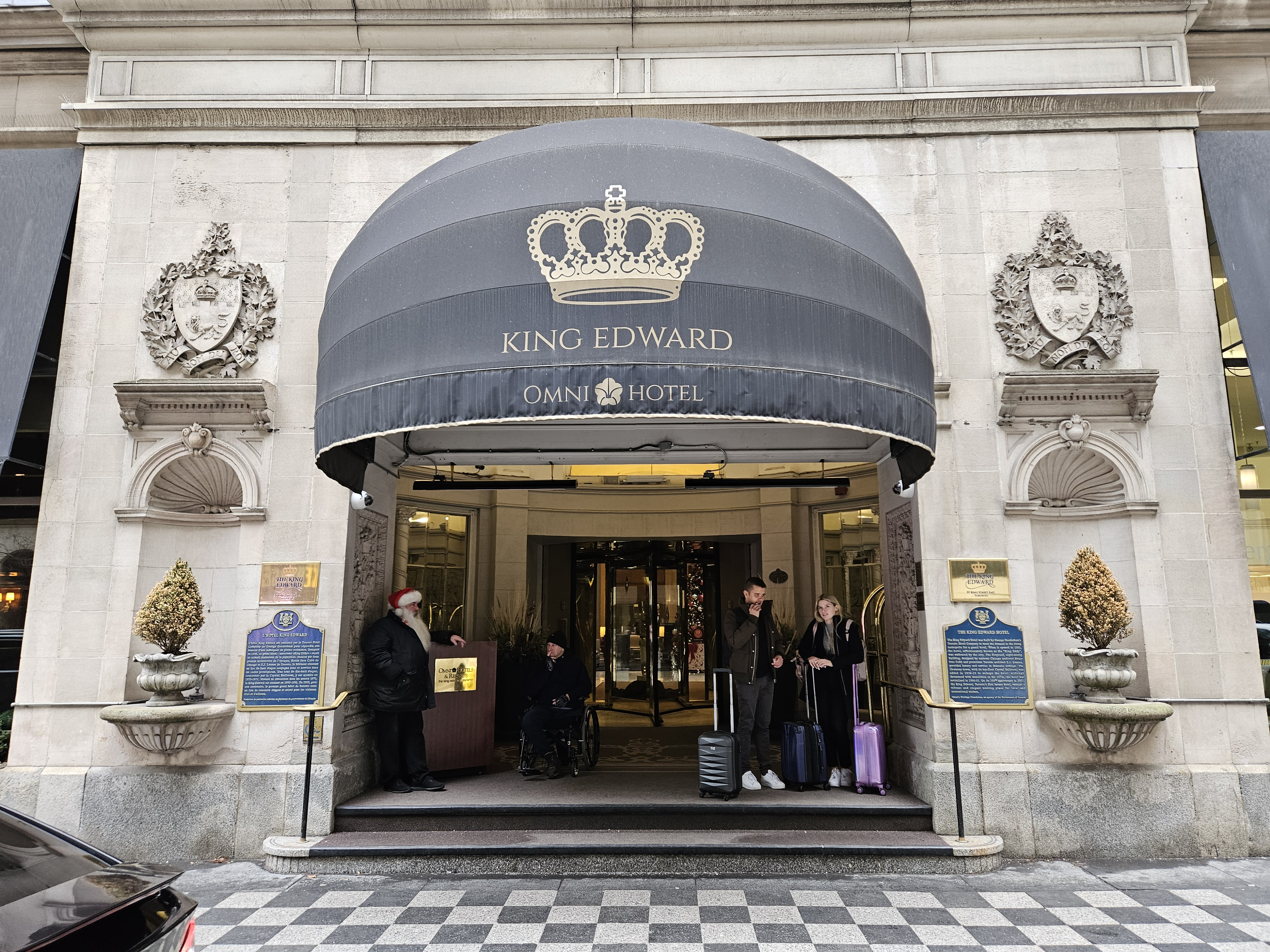
OMNI King Edward VII hotel entrance, Toronto

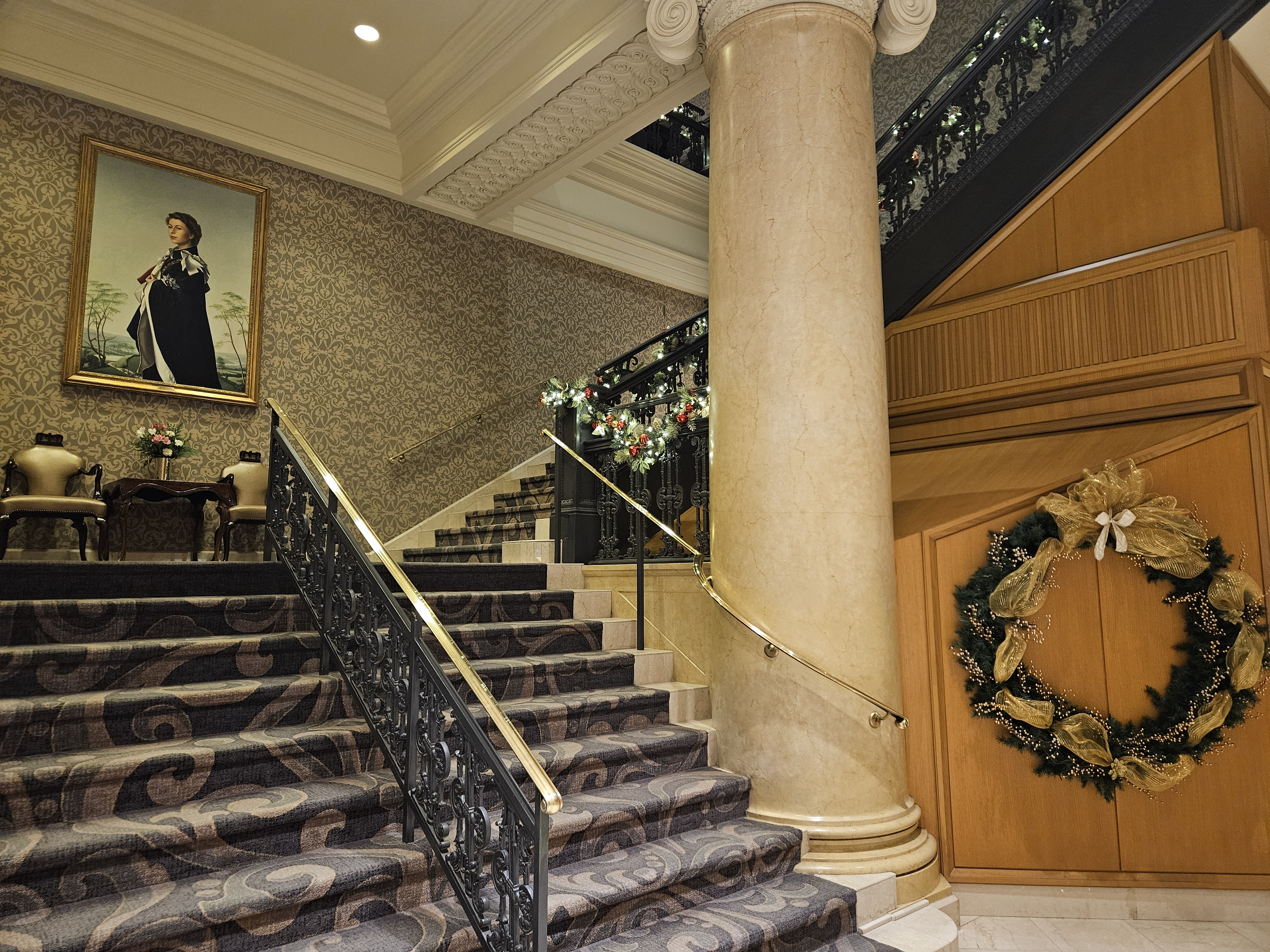
Hotel entrance stairs with Queen Elizabeth II portrait

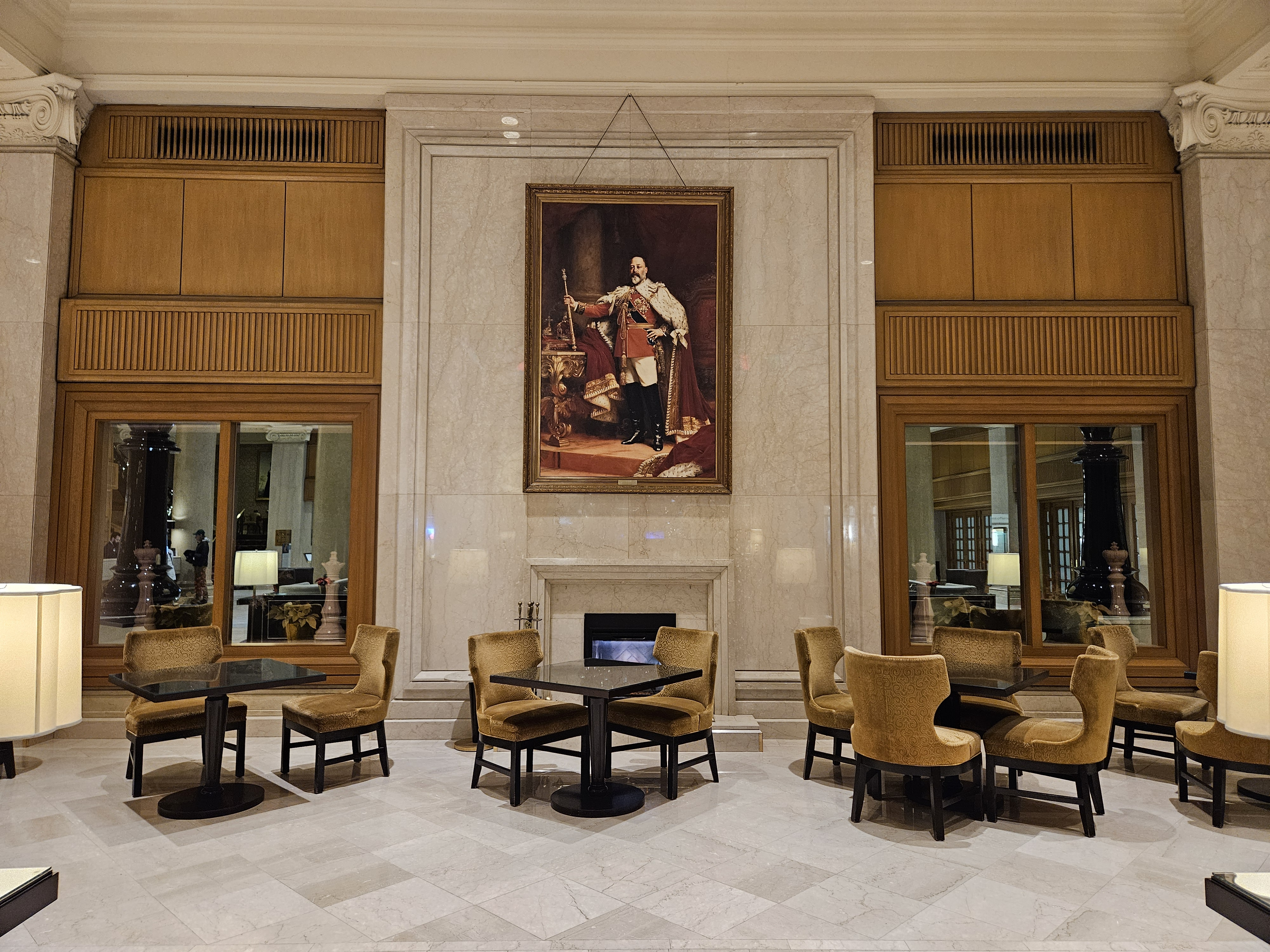
King Edward VII portrait in the OMNI hotel

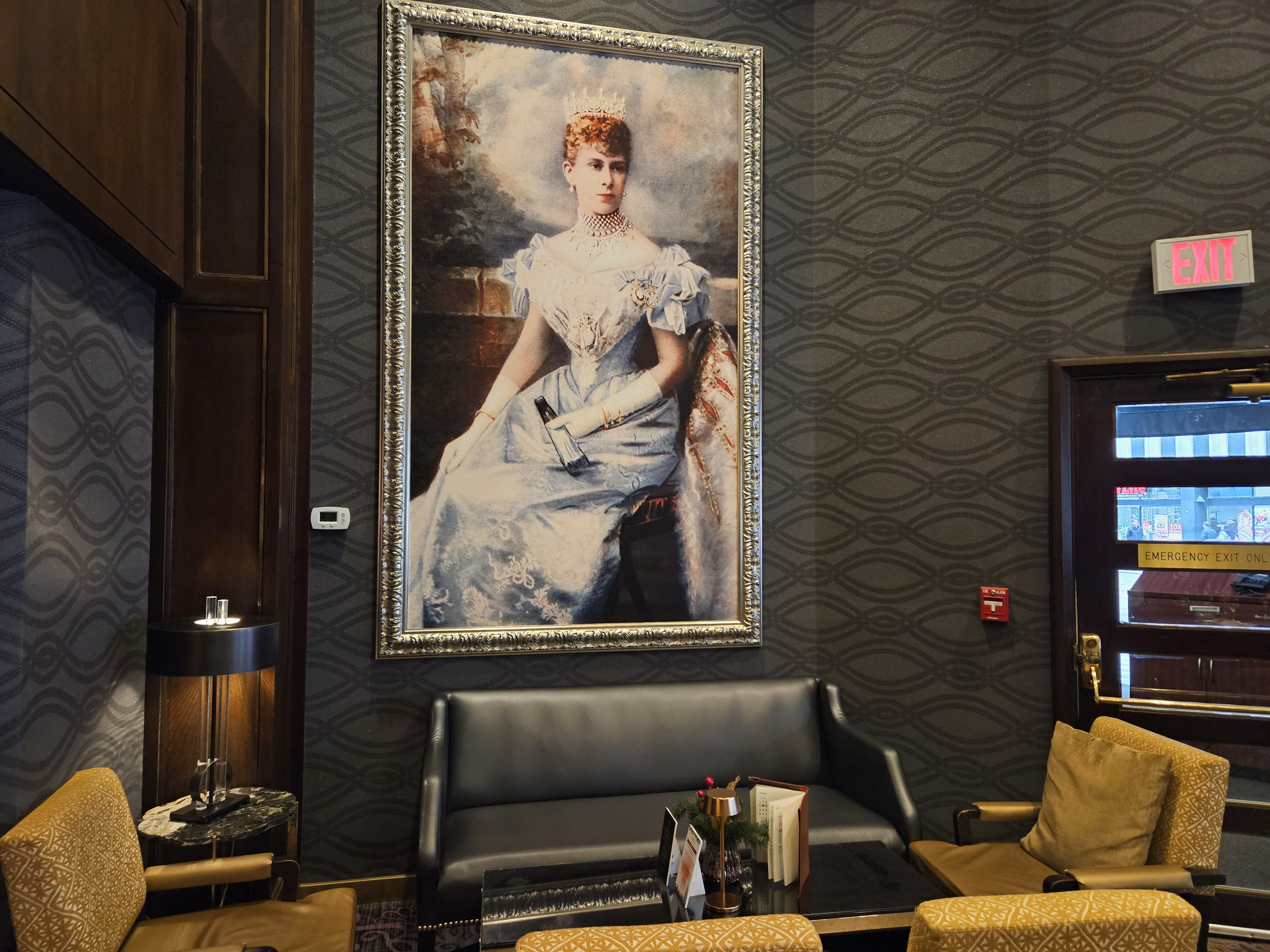
Mary of Teck portrait in the Consort Bar

== See also ==
- Royal eponyms in Canada
- Monarchy in Ontario
