= Harry Caray's Italian Steakhouse =

American steakhouse chain

Harry Caray's Italian Steakhouse and Bar

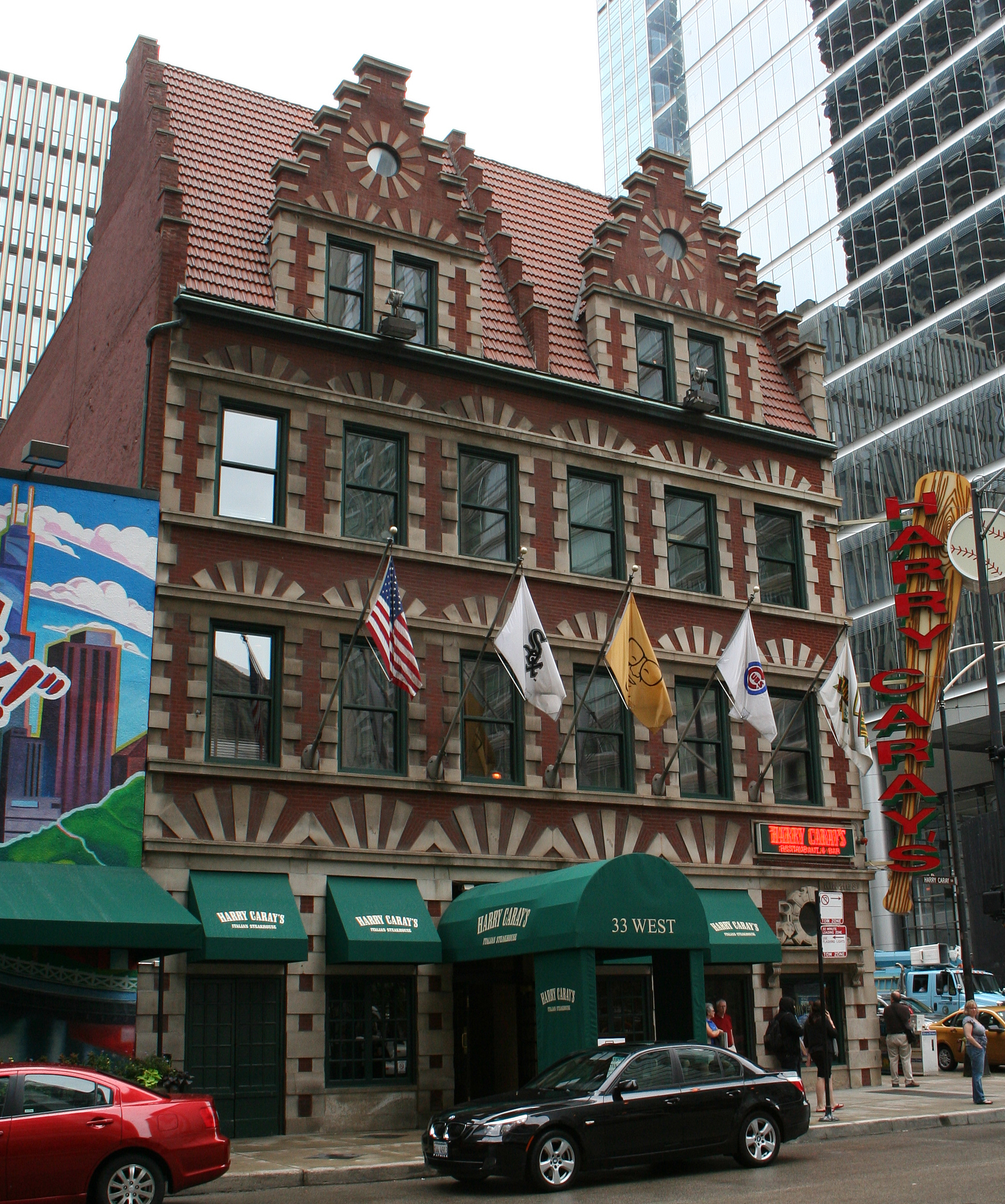
- Harry Caray's Italian Steakhouse and Bar Facade
- Company type: Private
- Industry: Restaurant
- Genre: Casual dining
- Founded: 1987; 39 years ago
- Number of locations: 7 (2016)
- Key people: Harry Caray (founder); Dutchie Caray (lead investment partner); Marv Levy (minority partner); Ryne Sandberg (minority partner); Bob Costas (minority partner); Grant DePorter (CEO)
- Products: Steaks; Italian-American cuisine
- Parent: Harry Caray's Restaurant Group
- Website: harrycarays.com

Harry Caray's Italian Steakhouse and Bar is an American steakhouse chain specializing in steak and Italian-American cuisine. The restaurant was established in 1987 in Chicago's River North neighborhood, in the former Chicago Varnish Company Building, by a partnership between popular Chicago Cubs broadcaster Harry Caray and restaurateur Grant DePorter. It has alternately been described by writers as "famed" and "legendary".

Harry Caray's fare includes steaks as well as pastas, salads, and seafood. They have a total of seven locations throughout the Chicago area, including one seafood restaurant named Harry Caray's Holy Mackerel!. The original location contains a large array of sports and Cubs memorabilia.

== Gallery ==
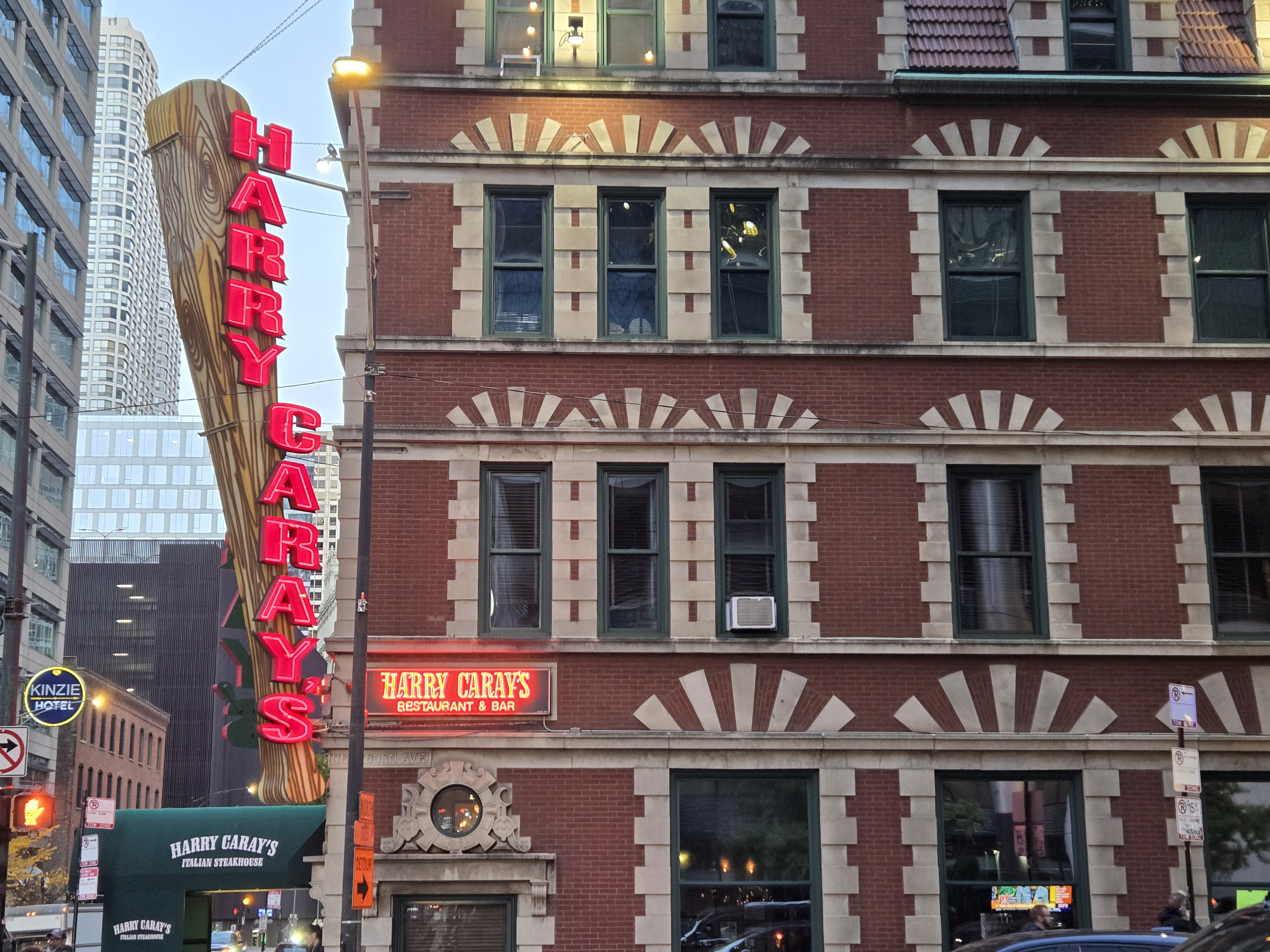
Harry Caray's Italian Steakhouse and Bar, Chicago Varnish Company Building

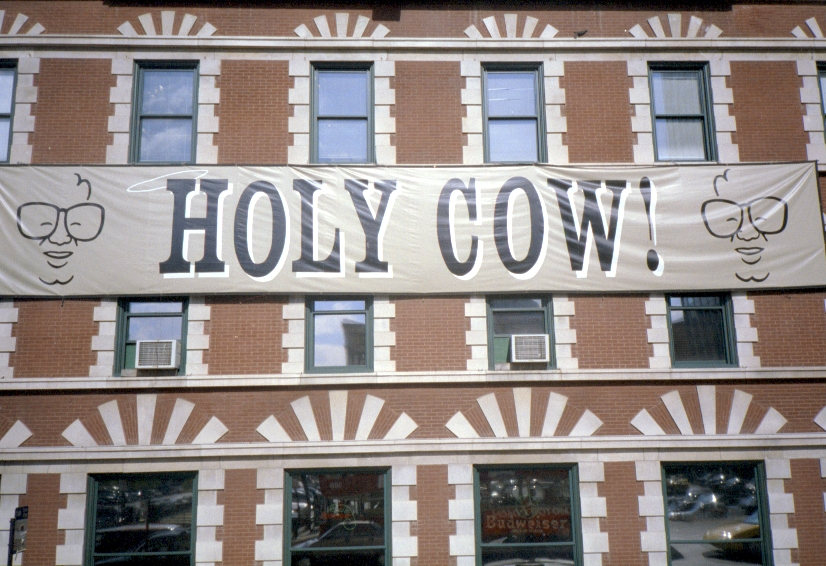
Holy Cow! Harry Caray's Italian Steakhouse and Bar

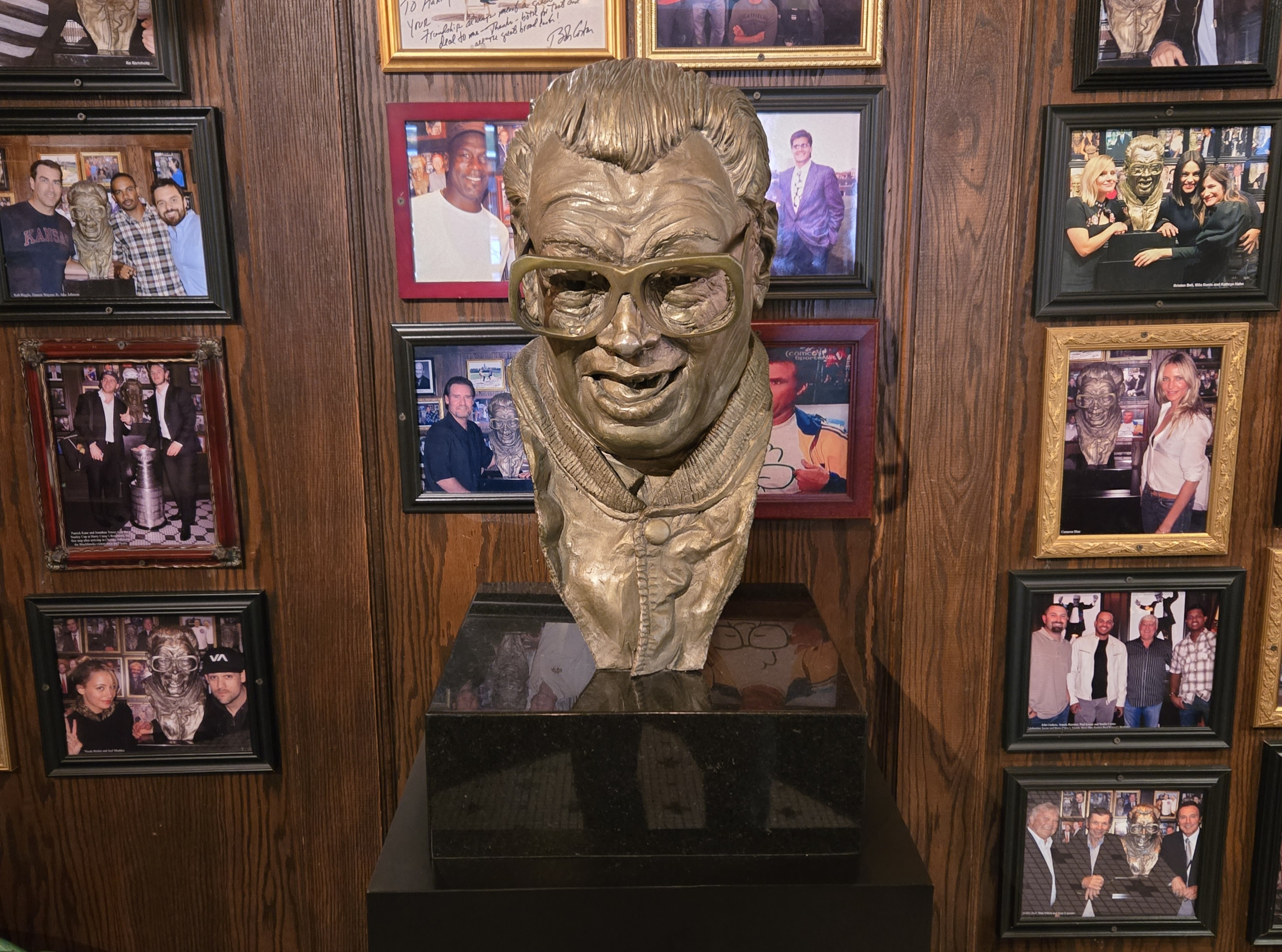
Harry Caray Bust, Harry Caray's Italian Steakhouse and Bar

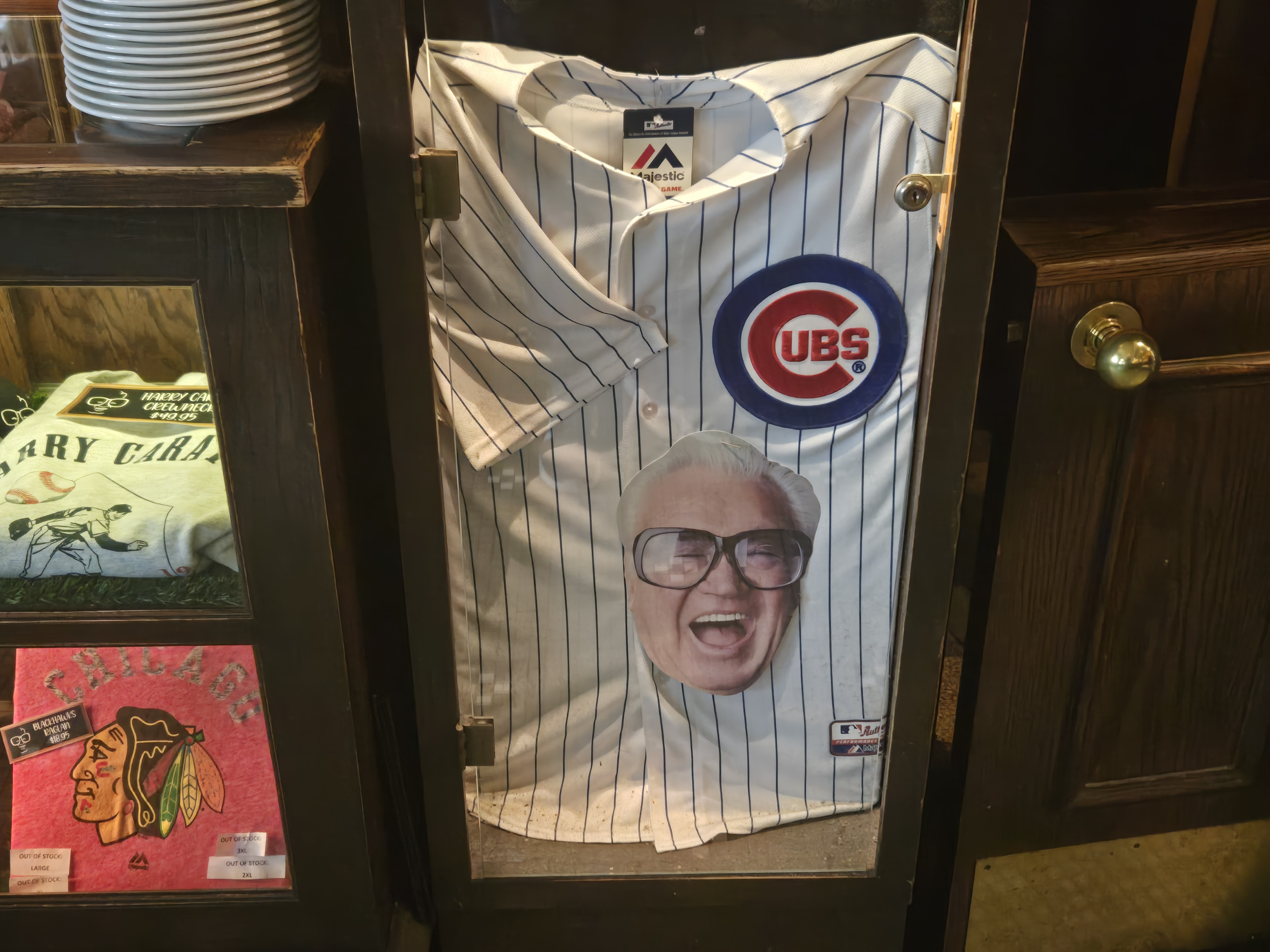
Harry Caray and the Cubs, Harry Caray's Italian Steakhouse and Bar

== See also ==
- List of steakhouses
