= Donald J. DePorter =

American philanthropist

Donald J. "Don" DePorter (January 21, 1942 - August 4, 1996) is an American philanthropist, who served on several civic and charitable committees in Chicago, USA. He was recognized several times by Chicago Mayor Richard M. Daley for his volunteerism and dedication to betterment of the city. DePorter was the founder of Chicago Gateway Green, a non-profit organization dedicated to the beautification and greening of Chicago, with a particular focus on landscaping the "gateways" leading into and out of the city. Since its founding in 1986, thousands of volunteers have dedicated their time to Chicago Gateway Green's efforts.

== Life ==
DePorter worked for Hyatt Hotels & Resorts for almost thirty years, serving as a regional vice-president for approximately twenty of those years.

== Legacy ==
When DePorter died in 1996, Mayor Daley dedicated one of the "gateways" into the city at the base of the Kennedy Expressway and the Ohio and Ontario Street feeder ramp (formerly known as the "North Orleans Triangle") as the "Donald J. DePorter Gateway" in DePorter's honor.

DePorter's son, Grant DePorter, has gone on to serve as Chairman of Chicago Gateway Green. A successful restaurateur, Grant DePorter came to worldwide prominence in 2004 when he paid US$113,824.16 for a baseball which a fan had unwittingly deflected out of the hands of a Chicago Cubs player (thus contributing to the team's defeat in the 2003 National League Championship Series), and then having the ball blown-up in a nationally televised event intended to help end the "Curse of the Billy Goat" which had afflicted the Cubs since 1945.
