= Ladies' Literary Club =

- U.S. National Register of Historic Places
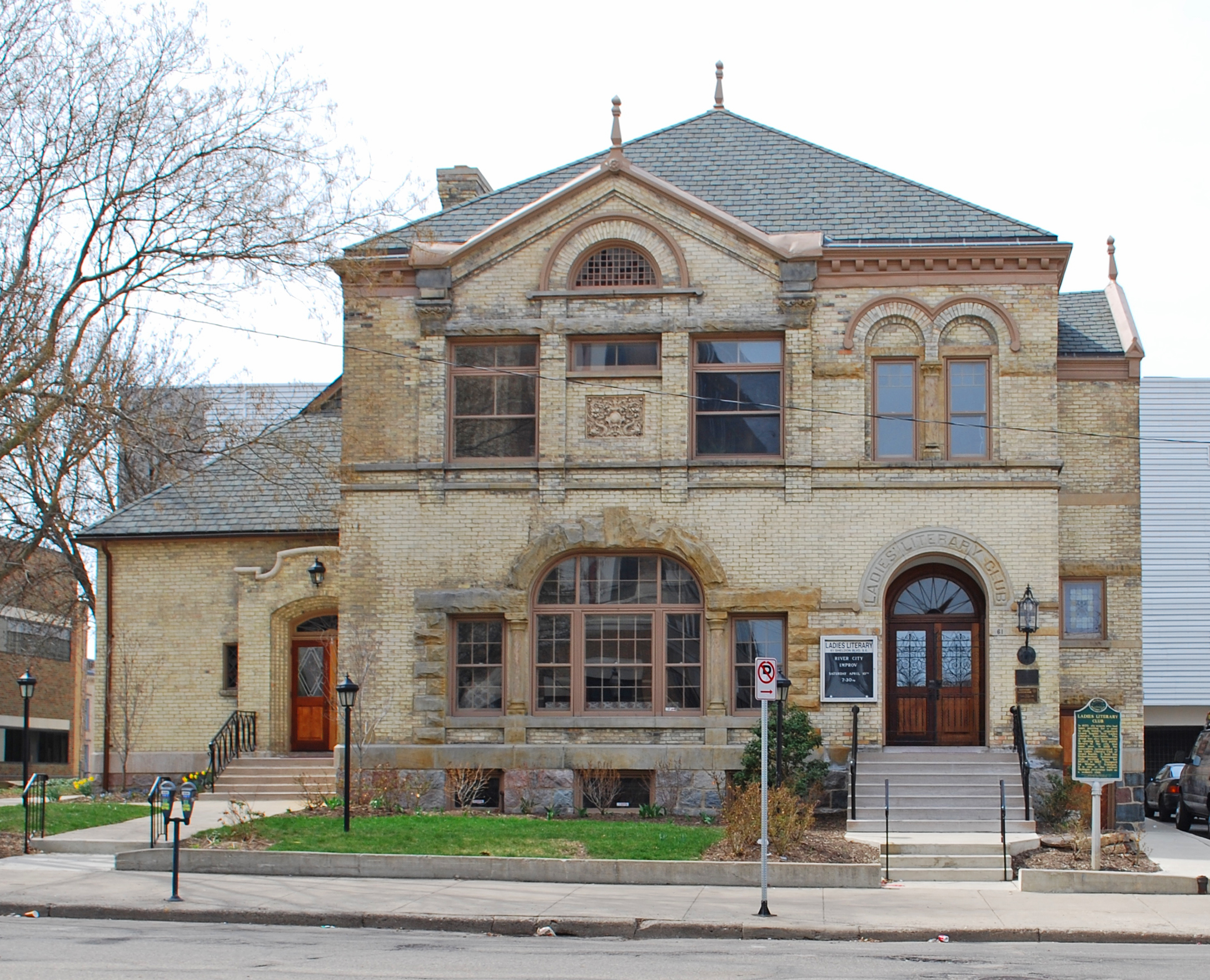
- Interactive map
- Location: 61 Sheldon St., SE., Grand Rapids, Michigan
- Coordinates: 42°57′45″N 85°40′01″W
- Area: less than one acre
- Built: 1887
- Architect: William G. Robinson
- Architectural style: Romanesque, Richardsonian Romanesque
- NRHP reference No.: 71000400
- Added to NRHP: October 26, 1971

The Ladies' Literary Club also known as Wednesday Literary Club was built as a social club building located at 61 Sheldon Street SE in Grand Rapids, Michigan. It was listed on the National Register of Historic Places in 1971. It is currently owned by a private investment firm, operated by The Penny Loafer, LLC. "The Lit Grand Rapids" is a registered 501(c)(3) nonprofit that serves the community and is a cultural hub for mission-aligned groups and organizations.

== History ==
In 1869, a group of Grand Rapids women organized a small history class. In 1870, this grew into the Ladies' Literary Association, which was formally organized as an association that year. The Association was influential in opening a public library in the city. In 1882, the group was re-incorporated at the Ladies' Literary Club to promote literary and scientific subjects. The club grew, and in 1887 they decided to construct their own building. The Club purchased a lot and hired local architect William G. Robinson to design a clubhouse. Ground was broken in 1887, and construction was completed by December of that year.

Major additions and renovations were completed in 1931 and in 2005, the club disbanded due to declining membership. In 2006, the remaining members transferred ownership of the building to Calvin College, which made $1 million worth of improvements to the building. The college used the building as a music, theater and entertainment venue. However, in 2014, they had to sell the building.

In 2018, a private firm purchased the building and invested further into renovations, removing all theater seats, adding a passthrough permanent cocktail bar complete with a custom bar top that displays the hundreds of 3-inch gold plaques with the names of donors and contributors, that were affixed to the chairs in the original theater. The newly remodeled building would now be called, "The Lit event space".

In March 2020, when the U.S. CDC declared a national emergency in response to the COVID‑19 pandemic, all nonessential businesses were ordered to shut down. The Lit GR was forced to cancel its scheduled events and remained closed until late in the year. The venue never fully recovered from the disruption, and by 2024 it ultimately closed its doors.

The building sat vacant until July 2025, when a locally based event company, The Penny Loafer LLC, negotiated a usage agreement to assume operations and restore the space as a community gathering place. Under this agreement, the company revitalized the front parlor as The Parlor Café, transformed the upstairs into an Upper Suite for small groups, refreshed the lower‑level Green Room for performers, and reopened the historic theater for a wide range of community uses. These included weddings, concerts, vintage movie nights, dinner theater, comedy nights, open mic events for emerging local artists, dance and yoga classes, recitals, and rehearsal or educational space for local arts groups, according to Penny Hock, owner of The Penny Loafer LLC and President of the Board of Directors for the nonprofit. Other members of the Board of Directors are: Elizabeth Batts, Mary Jane Drake, Patti Fitzgerald, Judith A. Herrick, Sandra Recker, Pamela Sheldon, and Christine Stephens-Krieger.

In October 2025, The Lit by The Penny Loafer became a registered 501(c)(3) charity with a mission to restore the building’s original purpose and honor the legacy of the women who created it. By February 2026, The Lit had already hosted more than 100 events and formed partnerships with over 40 organizations—most of them nonprofit. The Lit has also launched a young‑adult entrepreneur program and is sponsoring three newly formed adult-led groups, further expanding its role as a catalyst for community growth and creativity.

Over the years, the club has hosted speeches by Theodore Roosevelt, William Howard Taft, and Woodrow Wilson.

== Description ==
The Ladies' Literary Club is a two-story brick structure with a tall single-story wing attached to the rear housing an auditorium. Bluestone trim is used around the doors and windows, and it has a slate roof. Although the building is substantially brick rather than stone, the design exhibits the massive Richardsonian Romanesque style. The building has French plane and stained glass windows. This includes a Tiffany glass window appraised at $225,000.

== Notable people ==
- Loraine Immen, president, Ladies' Literary Club (1890)
