= Henry Ives Cobb =

American architect (1859–1931)

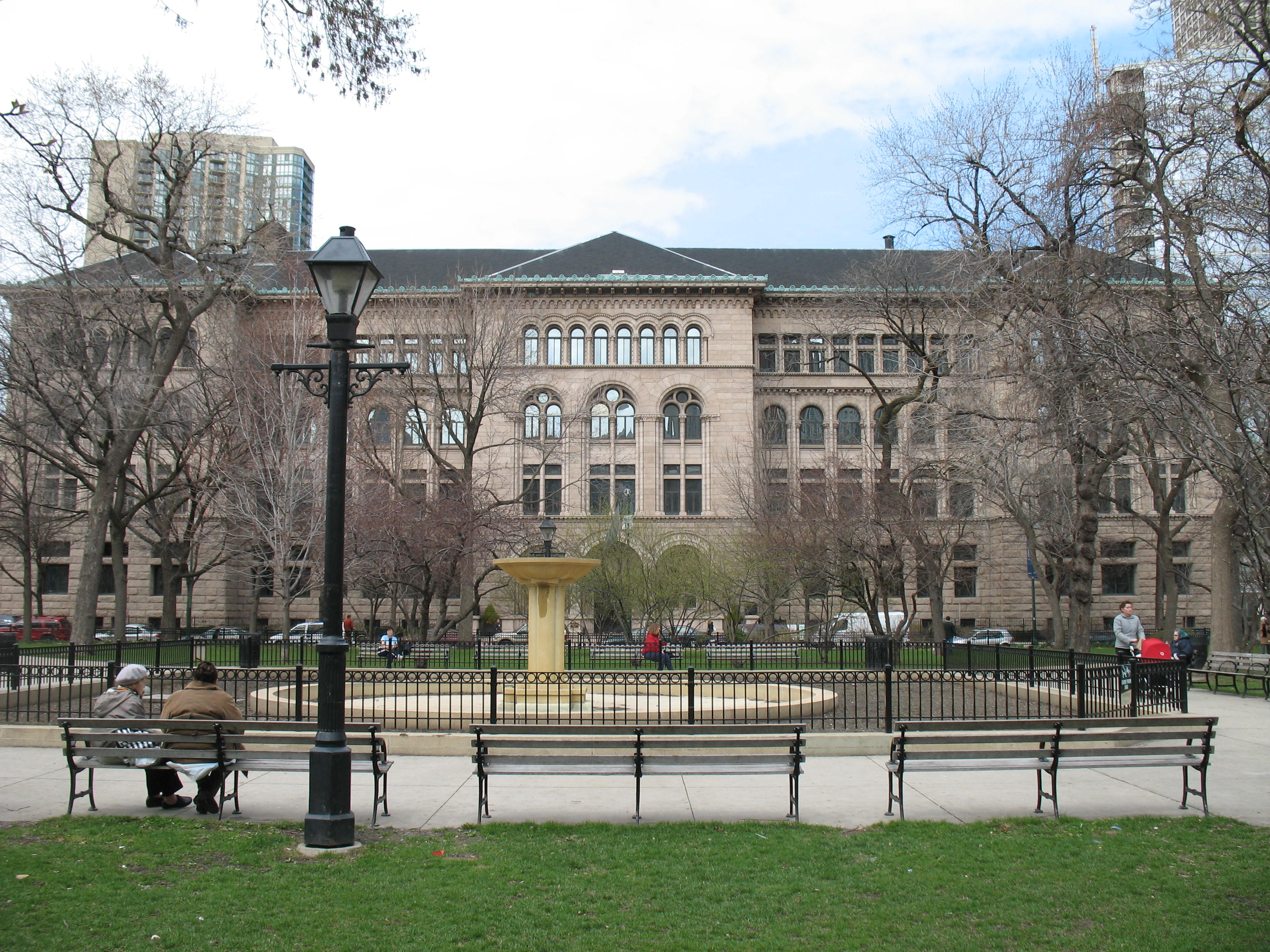
The Newberry Library, Washington Square Park, Chicago

Henry Ives Cobb (August 19, 1859 – March 27, 1931) was an architect from the United States. Based in Chicago in the last decades of the 19th century, he was known for his designs in the Richardsonian Romanesque and Victorian Gothic styles.

== Biography ==
Cobb was born in Brookline, Massachusetts, to Albert Adams and Mary Russell Candler Cobb. Cobb studied at the Massachusetts Institute of Technology for one year then transferred to Harvard University where he graduated in 1881 with an engineering degree. After graduating, Cobb worked at the Boston architectural firm Peabody & Stearns before moving to Chicago in 1882.

In Chicago, Cobb partnered with Charles Sumner Frost and formed Cobb and Frost. They designed the Palmer Mansion (demolished) on Lake Shore Drive; the Chicago Varnish Company Building—listed on the National Register of Historic Places and as a Chicago Landmark; the Episcopal Church of the Atonement at 5749 North Kenmore Avenue—also on the National Register of Historic Places; the Chicago Federal Building (demolished); the Newberry Library; the Fisheries Building (demolished) at the World's Columbian Exposition; and many pre-1900 buildings at Lake Forest College and the University of Chicago. Elsewhere, he designed the Sinclair Oil Building (today the Liberty Tower), a Perpendicular-style skyscraper in downtown Manhattan, that was converted to residences in 1980; the Olive Building in St. Louis and co-designed the King Edward Hotel in Toronto. Cobb moved to Washington, D.C., in 1897 to escape the Chicago grime, which damaged his cherished art collection. Cobb is responsible for The University of Chicago Yerkes Observatory in Williams Bay, WI, constructed from 1895 to 1897, with its Greco-Roman terra-cotta architectural detail.

== Family ==
Henry Ives Cobb's grandmother, Augusta Adams Cobb, controversially abandoned her husband, Henry Cobb, and five of her seven children in 1843, and married Brigham Young as a plural wife.

Cobb and wife Emma Martin Smith had 10 children, seven of whom survived into adulthood. The children were: architect and author Henry Ives Cobb, Jr. (1883–1974), Cleveland Cobb (1884–?), Leonore Cobb (1885–?), Candler Cobb (c. 1887–?), Elliot Cobb (1888–?), Priscilla Cobb (1890–91), Alice Cobb (1892–93), Boughton Cobb (1894–1974), Russell Cobb (1897–?), and Emerson Cobb, (1902–10).

== Works ==
Building	Location	Dates	Notes	Image
Union Club of Chicago	Washington Place at Dearborn Street	1881	Designed by Henry Ives Cobb	
Palmer Mansion	1350 North Lake Shore Drive; Chicago	1885	Designed by Henry Ives Cobb	
Harriet F. Rees House	2110 S. Prairie Avenue; Chicago	1888	Designed by Cobb & Frost.	
Tippecanoe Place	620 West Washington Avenue; South Bend, Indiana	1889	Designed by Henry Ives Cobb. Recognized as a National Historic Landmark.	
Chicago Athletic Association	12 South Michigan Avenue; Chicago	1893	Designed by Henry Ives Cobb	
Garfield Building	1965 E. 6th Street; Cleveland, Ohio	1893	Designed by Henry Ives Cobb	
Newberry Library	60 West Walton Street; Chicago	1893	Designed by Henry Ives Cobb and William Poole	
St. Cecilia Music Center	24 Ransom NE; Grand Rapids, Michigan	1893	Designed by Henry Ives Cobb	
Chicago Varnish Company Building	33 West Kinzie Street; Chicago	1895	Designed by Henry Ives Cobb	
Olive Building	721 Olive Street; St. Louis	1896	Designed by Henry Ives Cobb; 1902 addition by Mauran, Russel & Garden	
Former Chicago Historical Society Building	632 North Dearborn Street; Chicago	1896	Designed by Henry Ives Cobb	
Yerkes Observatory	373 W. Geneva Street; Williams Bay, Wisconsin	1897	Designed by Henry Ives Cobb	
Woodward & Lothrop Store	1025 F Street NW; Washington, D.C.	1897	Designed by Henry Ives Cobb; subsequent expansions 1902-1927	
The Kip-Riker Mansion	432 Scotland Road; South Orange, New Jersey	1903	Designed by Henry Ives Cobb for Ira A. Kip, Jr. Presently Temple Sharey Tefilo Israel	
Chicago Federal Building	Dearborn and Adams Streets; Chicago	1905	Designed by Henry Ives Cobb	
Liberty Tower	55 Liberty Street; New York City	1909	Designed by Henry Ives Cobb	
Cort Theatre	64 Ellis Street; San Francisco	1911	Designed by Henry Ives Cobb	
King Edward Hotel	37 King Street East; Toronto	1920-1922	Designed by Henry Ives Cobb: 18-story tower	

== See also ==
- Architecture of Chicago
- Cobb and Frost
