= Chicago Varnish Company Building =

- U.S. National Register of Historic Places
- Chicago Landmark
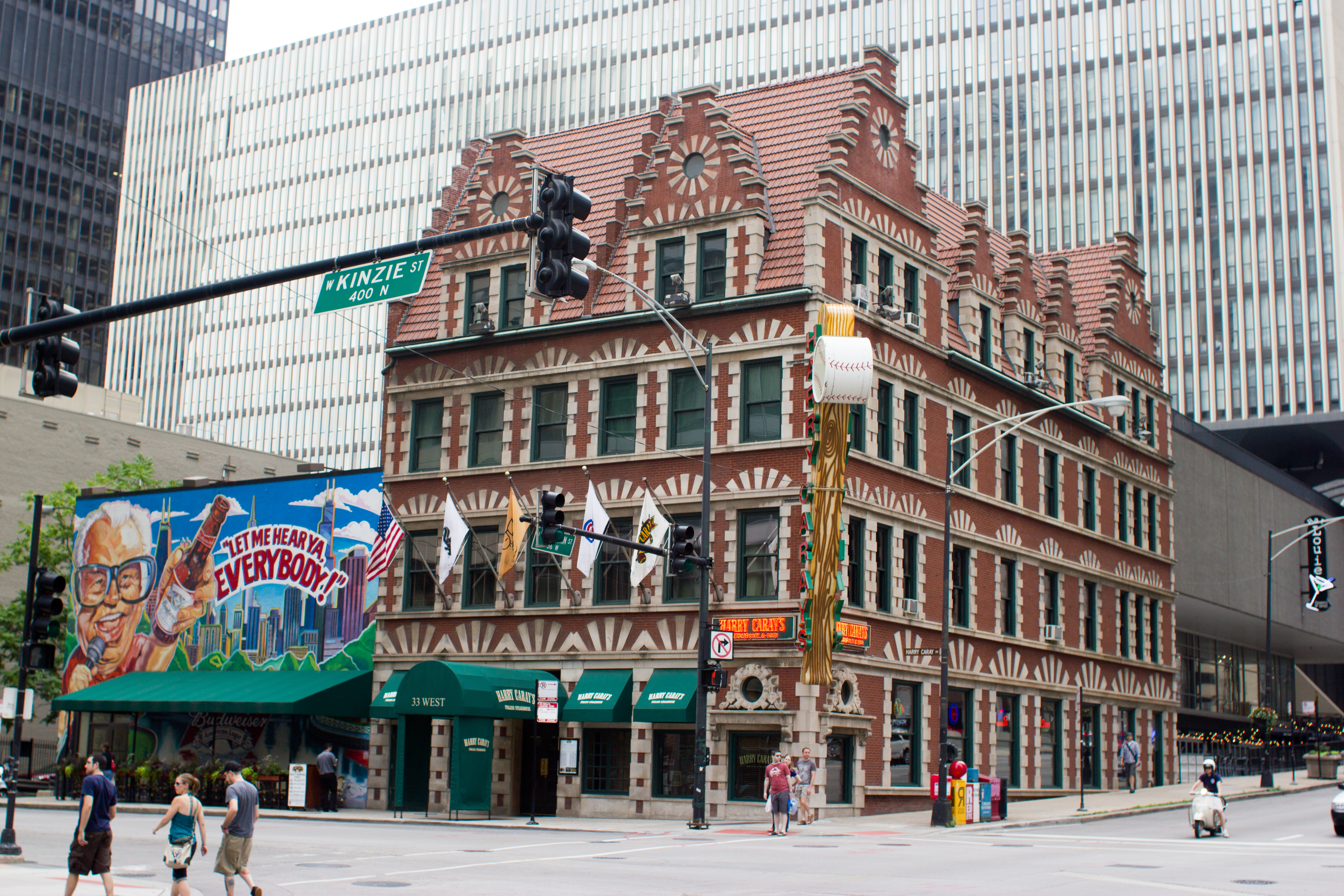

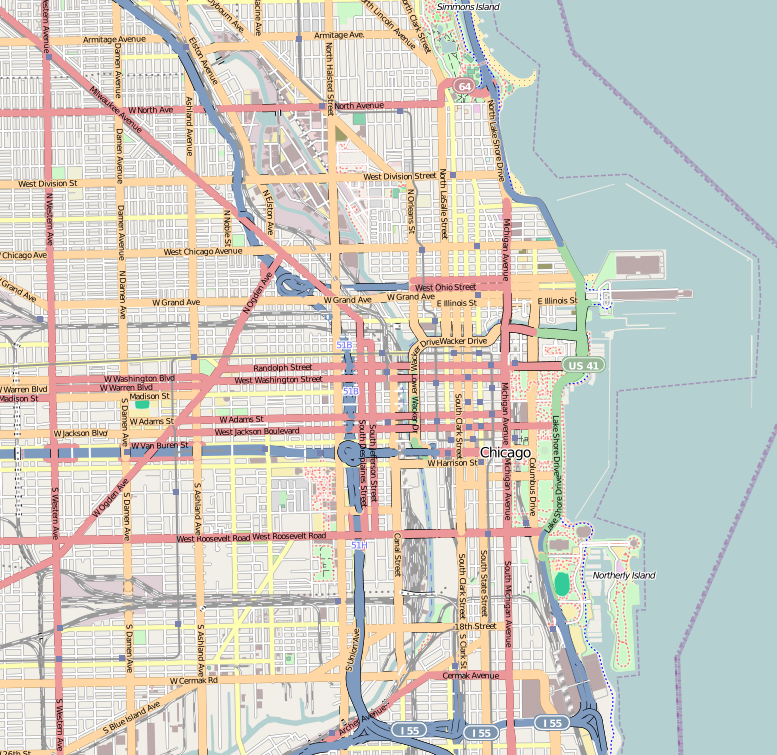
- Location within Central Chicago Location within Illinois Location within the United States
- Location: 33 W. Kinzie St. Chicago, Illinois
- Coordinates: 41°53′20.39″N 87°37′45.52″W
- Built: 1895
- Architect: Henry Ives Cobb
- Architectural style: Dutch Renaissance Revival
- NRHP reference No.: 01000649

Significant dates
- Added to NRHP: June 14, 2001
- Designated CHICL: July 25, 2001

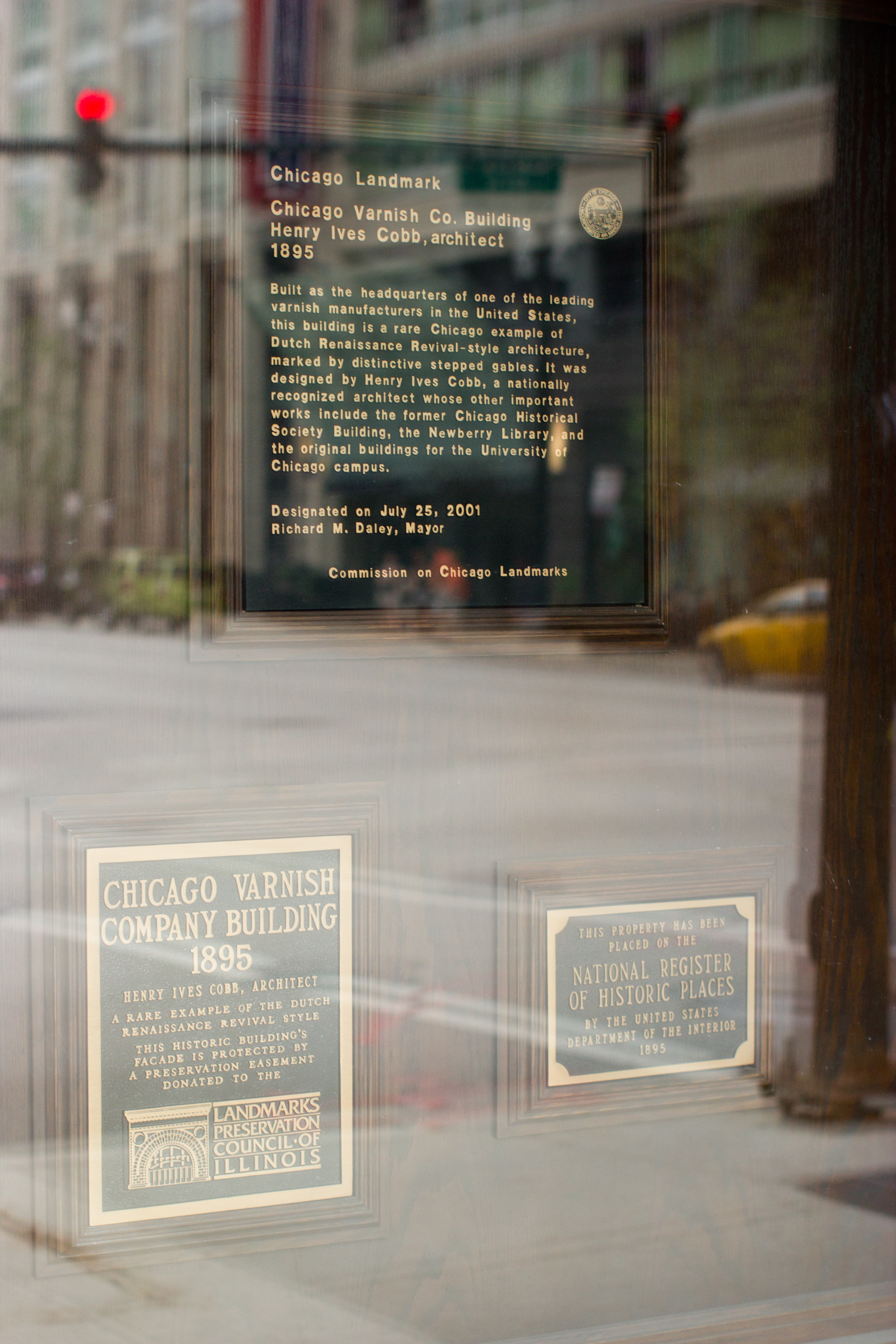
Markers of the building behind glass

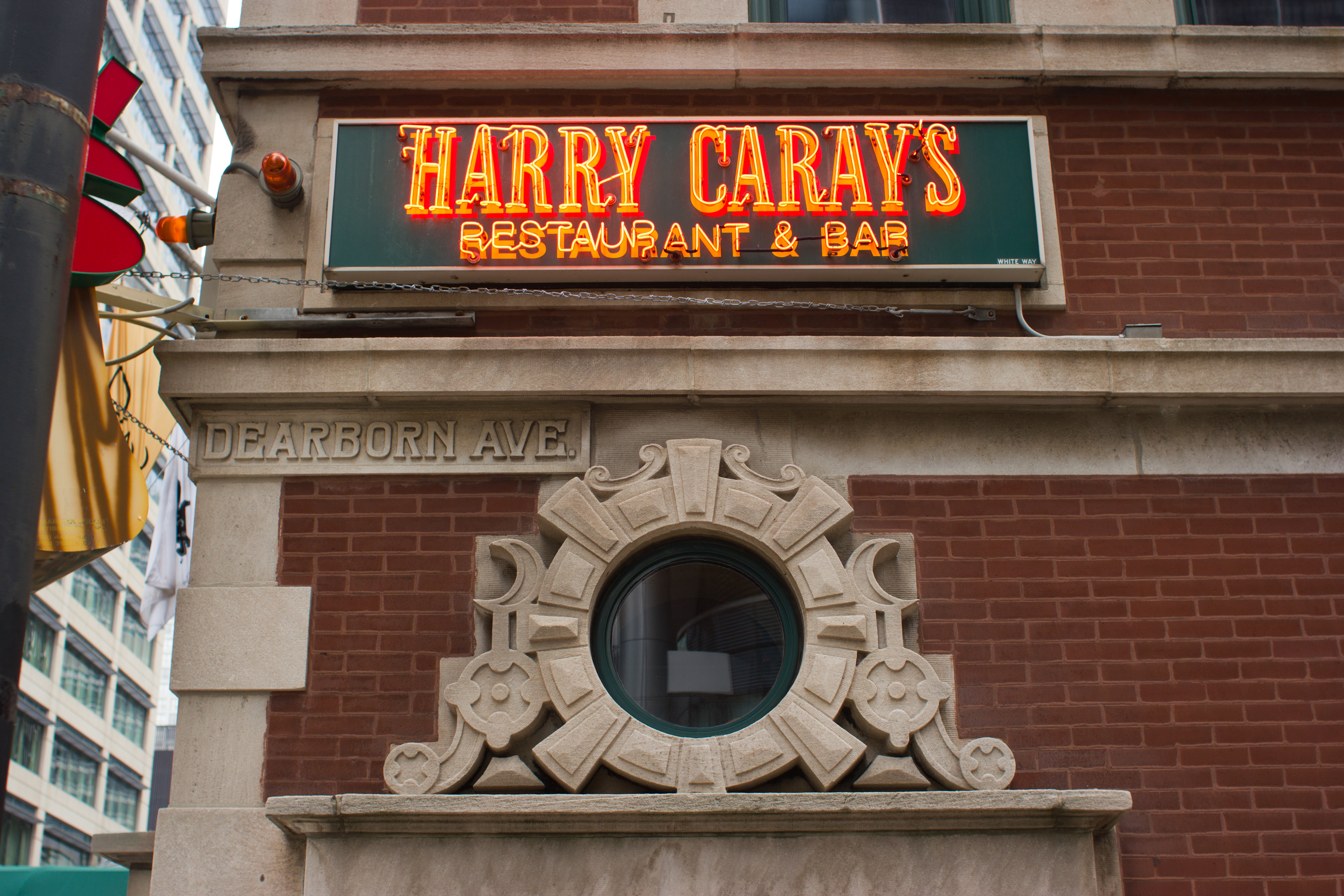
Window detail with neon business sign of current building occupant

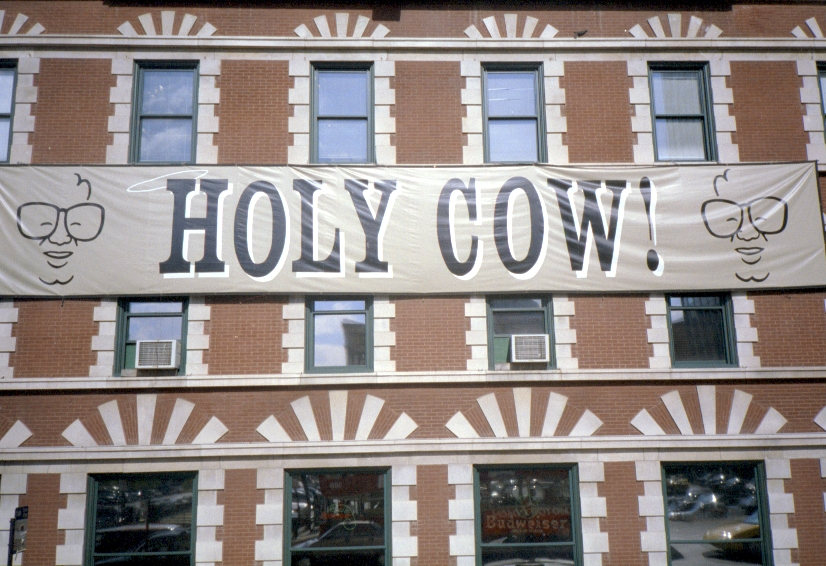
Sign on the side of the establishment circa 1998

The Chicago Varnish Company Building is a building built in 1895 as the headquarters of one of the leading varnish manufacturers in the United States, the Chicago Varnish Company. The building is a rare example of Dutch Renaissance Revival-style architecture in Chicago, and is marked by a steeply pitched roof paired with stepped gables of red brick and light stone in contrasting colors. The building was designed by Henry Ives Cobb, a nationally recognized architect whose other significant works include the former Chicago Historical Society Building, the Newberry Library, and the original buildings for the University of Chicago campus. The building was listed on the National Register of Historic Places on June 14, 2001, and was designated a Chicago Landmark on July 25, 2001.

After an extensive rehabilitation, including replacement of the multi-gabled clay tile roof and rebuilding the stepped parapets, Harry Caray's Italian Steakhouse opened in the building on October 23, 1987. The restaurant has received numerous awards for its food and service, and features many items of memorabilia, including a "Holy Cow" wearing the trademark Harry Caray eyeglasses that was sourced from Chicago's CowParade.

The building is distinctive for its use of the Dutch Renaissance revival style, with its stepped gables, steeply pitched tile roof, and contrasting brick and stone masonry.

The building and its restoration received the Chicago Landmarks Preservation Excellence award in 2006 for its careful restoration of the Ludowici roof.

== See also ==
- National Register of Historic Places listings in Central Chicago
- Chicago Landmark
- Murphy Varnish Works
