= St. Cecilia Music Center =

- St. Cecilia Society Building
- U.S. National Register of Historic Places
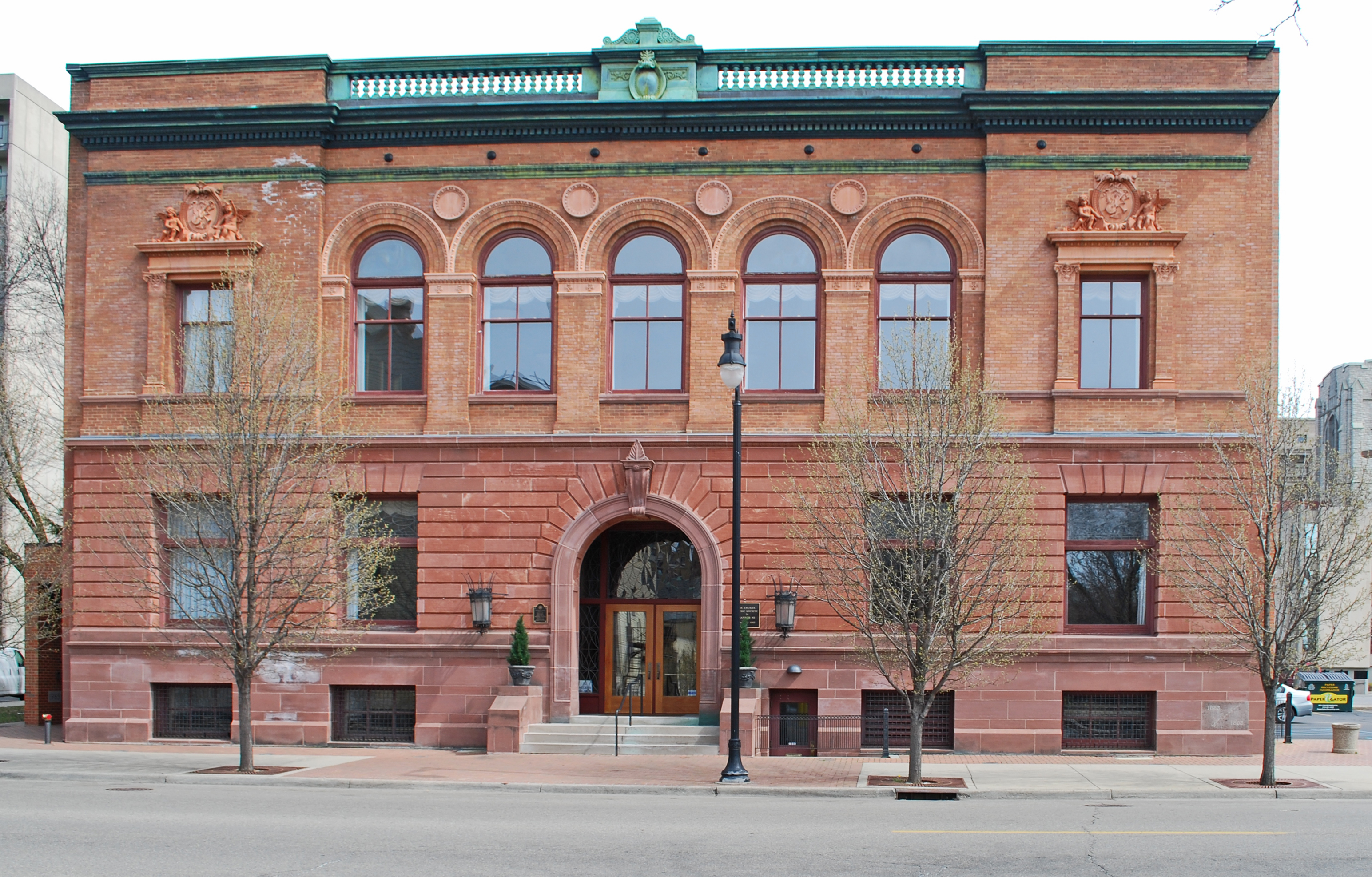

- Location within Michigan Location within the United States
- Interactive map
- Location: 24-30 Ransom Ave., NE, Grand Rapids, Michigan
- Coordinates: 42°57′49″N 85°39′53″W
- Area: less than one acre
- Built: 1894
- Architect: Henry Ives Cobb
- Architectural style: Renaissance Revival
- NRHP reference No.: 71000401
- Added to NRHP: December 9, 1971

The St. Cecilia Music Center, built in 1894 as the St. Cecilia Society Building, is a performance space located at 24 Ransom Avenue NE in Grand Rapids, Michigan. It was listed on the National Register of Historic Places in 1971. As of 2019, the building continues to house a musical performance space, ran by the original organization which built it.

== History ==
The St. Cecilia Society was founded in 1883 as a women's club devoted to "musical improvement and to the development in the community." The organization was named after Saint Cecilia, the patron saint of musicians. Within a few months membership had grown from nine women to nearly 100. In 1894, the Society decided to construct their own performance space, and hired Chicago architect Henry Ives Cobb to design a new building. The building was dedicated June 19, 1894. The building underwent a major renovation in 1925 to expand the seating capacity. The building was renovated again in 2016.

In 1970, the St. Cecilia Society changed its name to the St. Cecilia Music Society; in 2007 it was changed again to the St. Cecilia Music Center. Over the years, a number of nationally known musicians, singers, and conductors performed in the building, including Ernestine Schumann-Heink, Edward MacDowell, Olga Samaroff, and Ossip Gabrilowitsch. In addition, the Grand Rapids Symphony was started under the sponsorship of the Society, and run that way for many years.

== Description ==
The St. Cecilia Society Building is a two-story brick Renaissance Revival structure with a full basement. It has a flat roof covered with tar and gravel. The main facade is of brick on the second floor and stone on the first. There is terra cotta detailing around the arched and square window and door openings. The windows are of leaded glass, and the front entrance is flanked by elegant wrought iron entrance lights. A terra cotta frieze and cornice runs across the top. On the interior, the building contains a foyer, ballroom, office, small kitchen, an 80 foot by 100 foot auditorium, and dressing rooms.
