= Chicago Film Critics Association Awards 1990 =

Annual US film awards ceremony

3rd Chicago Film Critics Association
- Date: March 7, 1991
- Site: The Pump Room; Chicago, Illinois, U.S.

Highlights
- Best Picture: Goodfellas
- Most awards: Goodfellas (4)
- Most nominations: Goodfellas (7)

The 3rd Chicago Film Critics Association Awards were announced on March 7, 1991, during a ceremony at The Pump Room of the Omni Ambassador East Hotel. They honored the finest achievements in 1990 filmmaking. The nominees were announced on January 20, 1991. Goodfellas received the most nominations with seven, followed by Dances with Wolves with four. The former won the most awards with four, including Best Film. Actresses Kathy Bates and Joan Cusack earned two nominations each. This year was also notable for the introduction of two new categories: Best Cinematography and Best Screenplay.

== Winners and nominees ==
The winners and nominees for the 3rd Chicago Film Critics Association Awards are as follows:

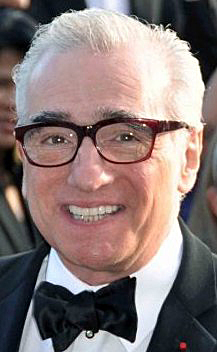
Martin Scorsese, Best Director winner and Best Adapted Screenplay co-winner

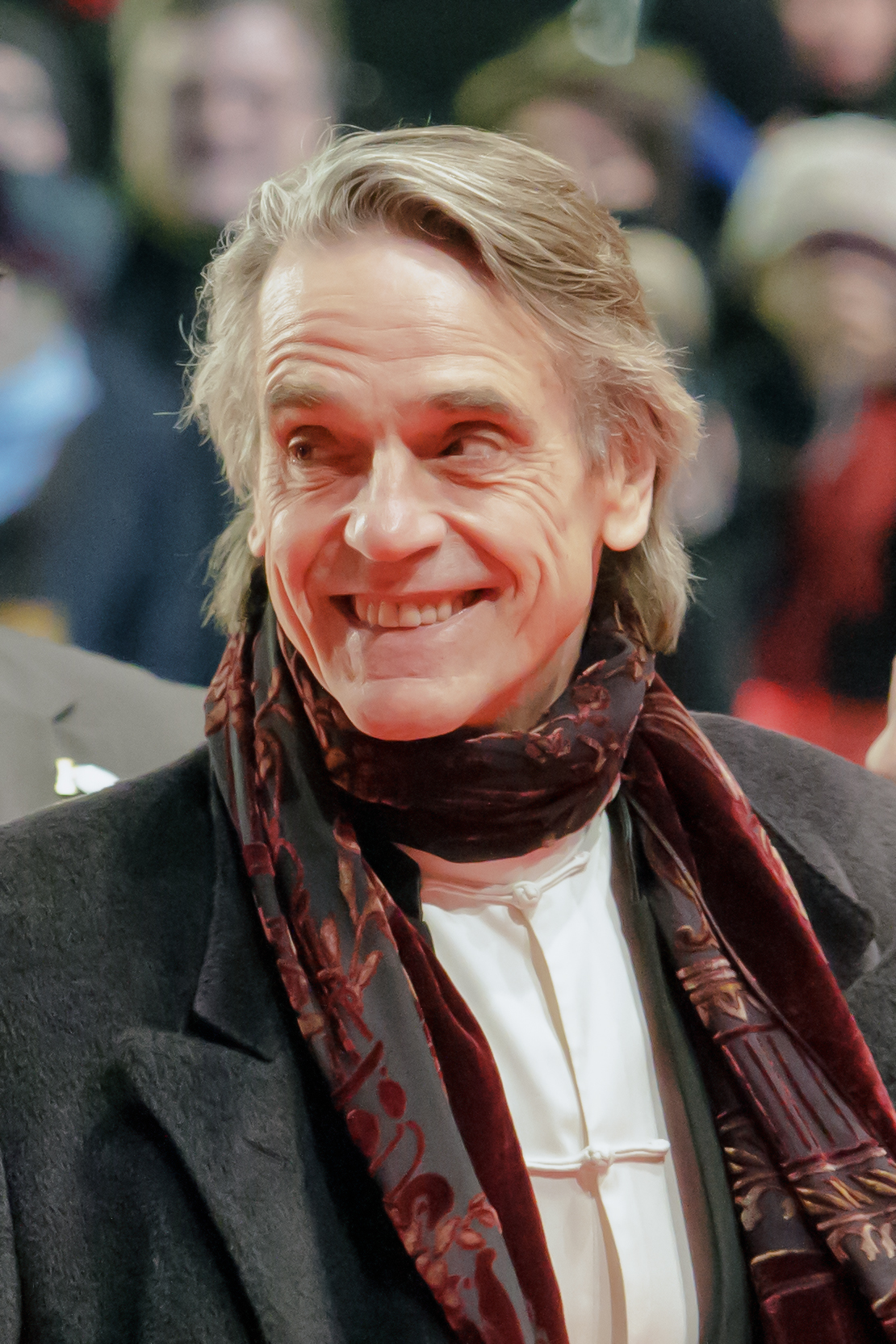
Jeremy Irons, Best Actor winner

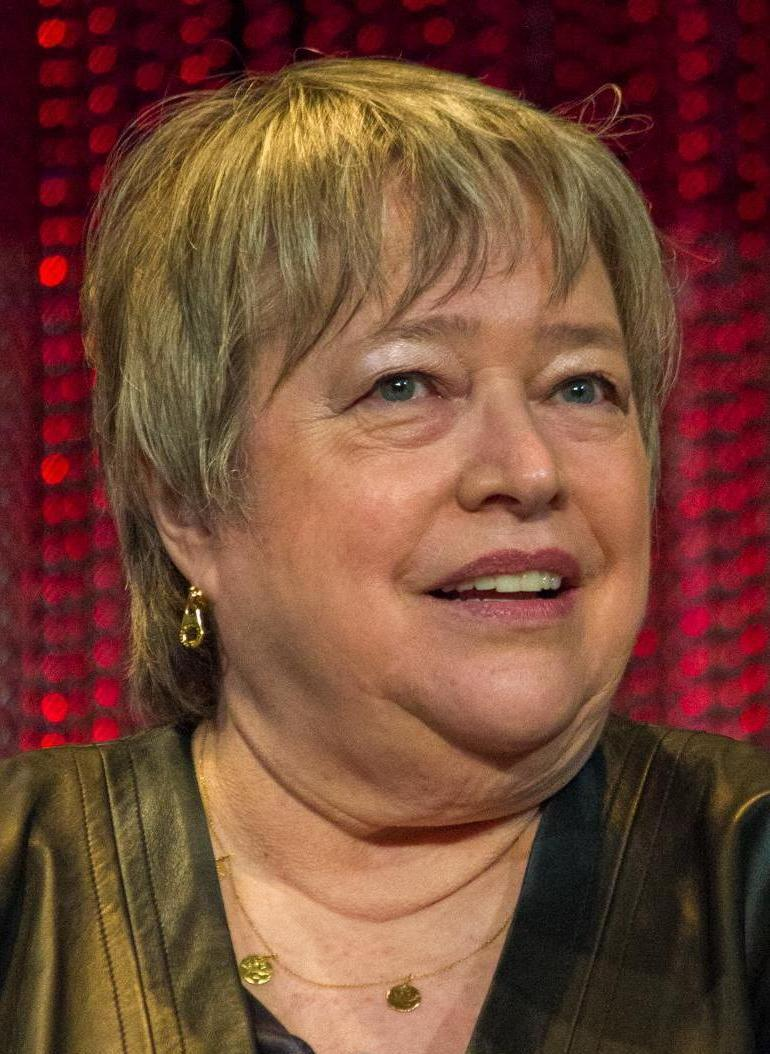
Kathy Bates, Best Actress winner

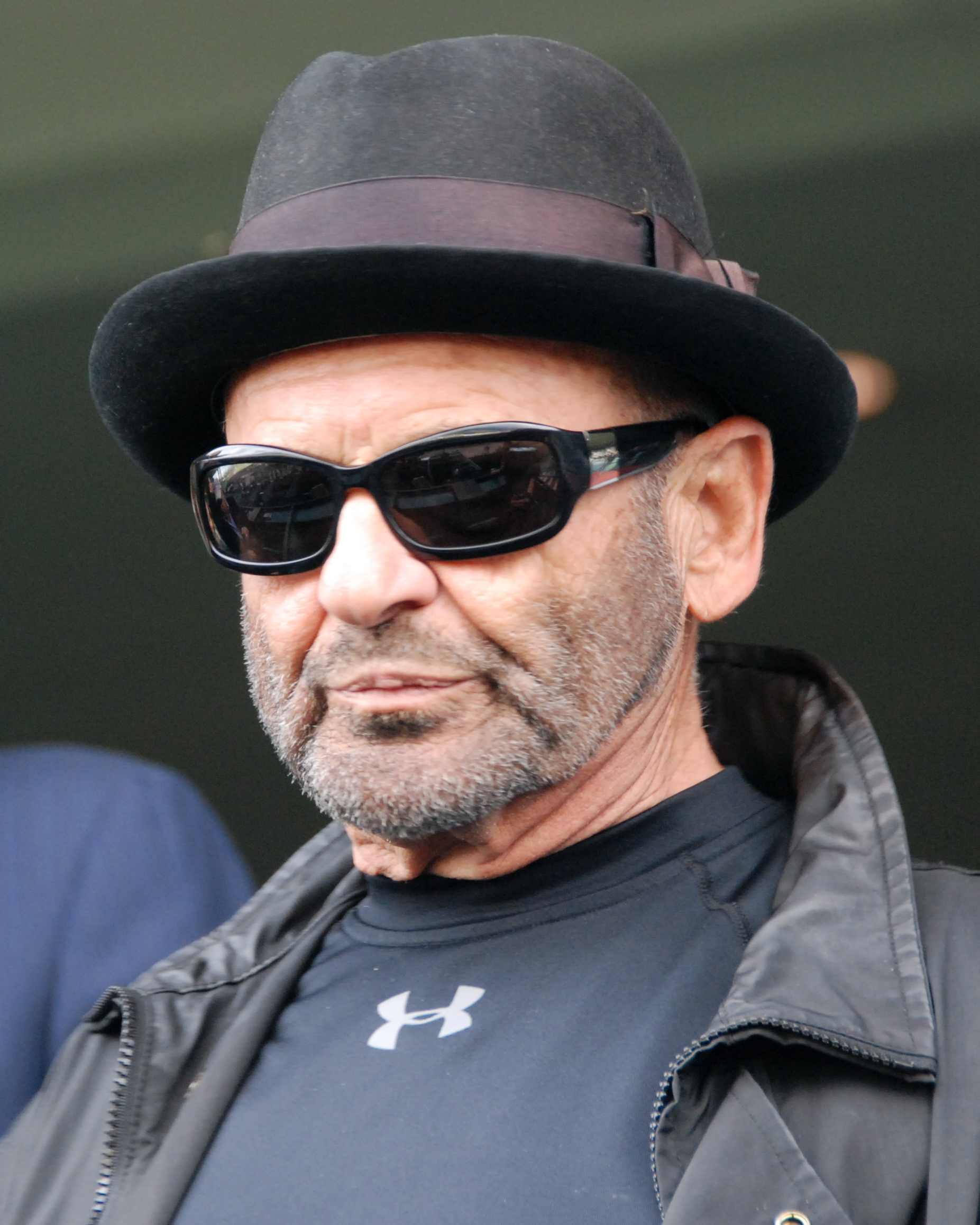
Joe Pesci, Best Supporting Actor winner

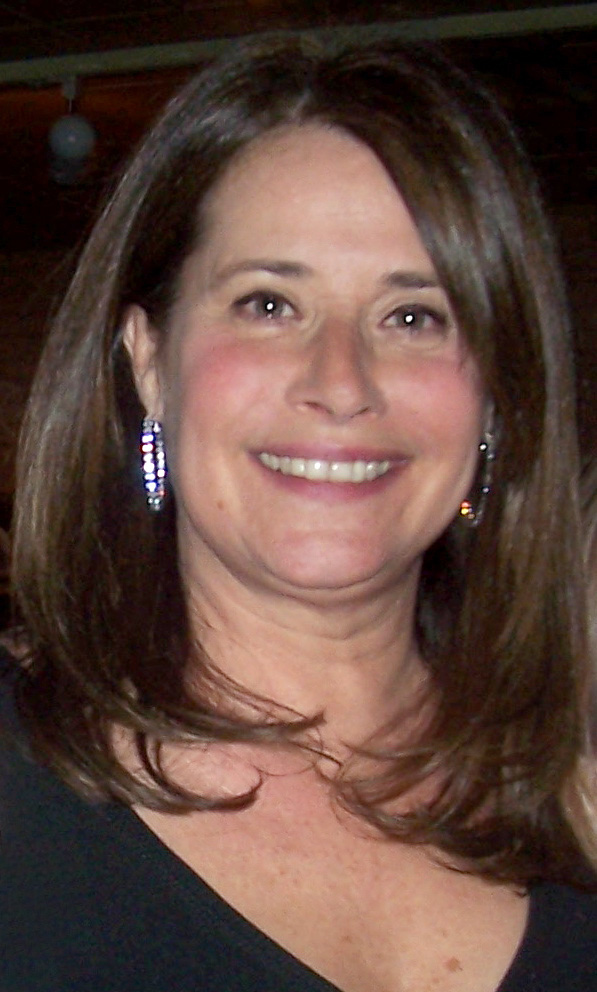
Lorraine Bracco, Best Supporting Actress winner

Best Film	Best Director
Goodfellas: Dances with Wolves; To Sleep with Anger	Martin Scorsese – Goodfellas: Kevin Costner – Dances with Wolves; Clint Eastwood – White Hunter Black Heart
Best Actor	Best Actress
Jeremy Irons – Reversal Fortune as Claus von Bülow: Robert De Niro – Awakenings as Leonard Lowe; Ray Liotta – Goodfellas as Henry Hill	Kathy Bates – Misery as Annie Wilkes: Anjelica Huston – The Grifters as Lilly Dillon; Joanne Woodward – Mr. & Mrs. Bridge as India Bridge
Best Supporting Actor	Best Supporting Actress
Joe Pesci – Goodfellas as Tommy DeVito: Andy García – The Godfather Part III as Vincent Corleone; Al Pacino – Dick Tracy as Alphonse "Big Boy" Caprice	Lorraine Bracco – Goodfellas as Karen Friedman Hill: Joan Cusack – Men Don't Leave as Jody; Dianne Wiest – Edward Scissorhands as Peg Boggs
Best Screenplay	Best Cinematography
Nicholas Pileggi and Martin Scorsese – Goodfellas: Michael Blake – Dances with Wolves; Joel Coen and Ethan Coen – Miller's Crossing	Dean Semler – Dances with Wolves: Michael Ballhaus – Goodfellas; Gordon Willis – The Godfather Part III
Best Foreign Language Film
The Cook, the Thief, His Wife & Her Lover (United Kingdom) in English – Peter Greenaway: Cyrano de Bergerac (France) in French – Jean-Paul Rappeneau; Dreams (Japan) in Japanese – Akira Kurosawa
Most Promising Actor	Most Promising Actress
Macaulay Culkin – Home Alone as Kevin McCallister: Anthony LaPaglia – Betsy's Wedding as Stevie Dee; Jason Patric – After Dark, My Sweet as Kevin "Kid" Collins; Billy Zane – Memphis Belle as Lt. Val "Valentine" Kozlowski	Penelope Ann Miller – The Freshman as Tina Sabatini: Kathy Bates – Misery as Annie Wilkes; Joan Cusack – Men Don't Leave as Jody

=== Films with multiple nominations and awards ===
Films that received multiple nominations
Nominations	Film
7	Goodfellas
4	Dances with Wolves
2	The Godfather Part III
2	Men Don't Leave
2	Misery

Films that won multiple awards
Awards	Film
4	Goodfellas
