= Logistics of the 1952 Democratic and Republican National Conventions =

- 1952 Democratic National Convention; 1952 Republican National Convention
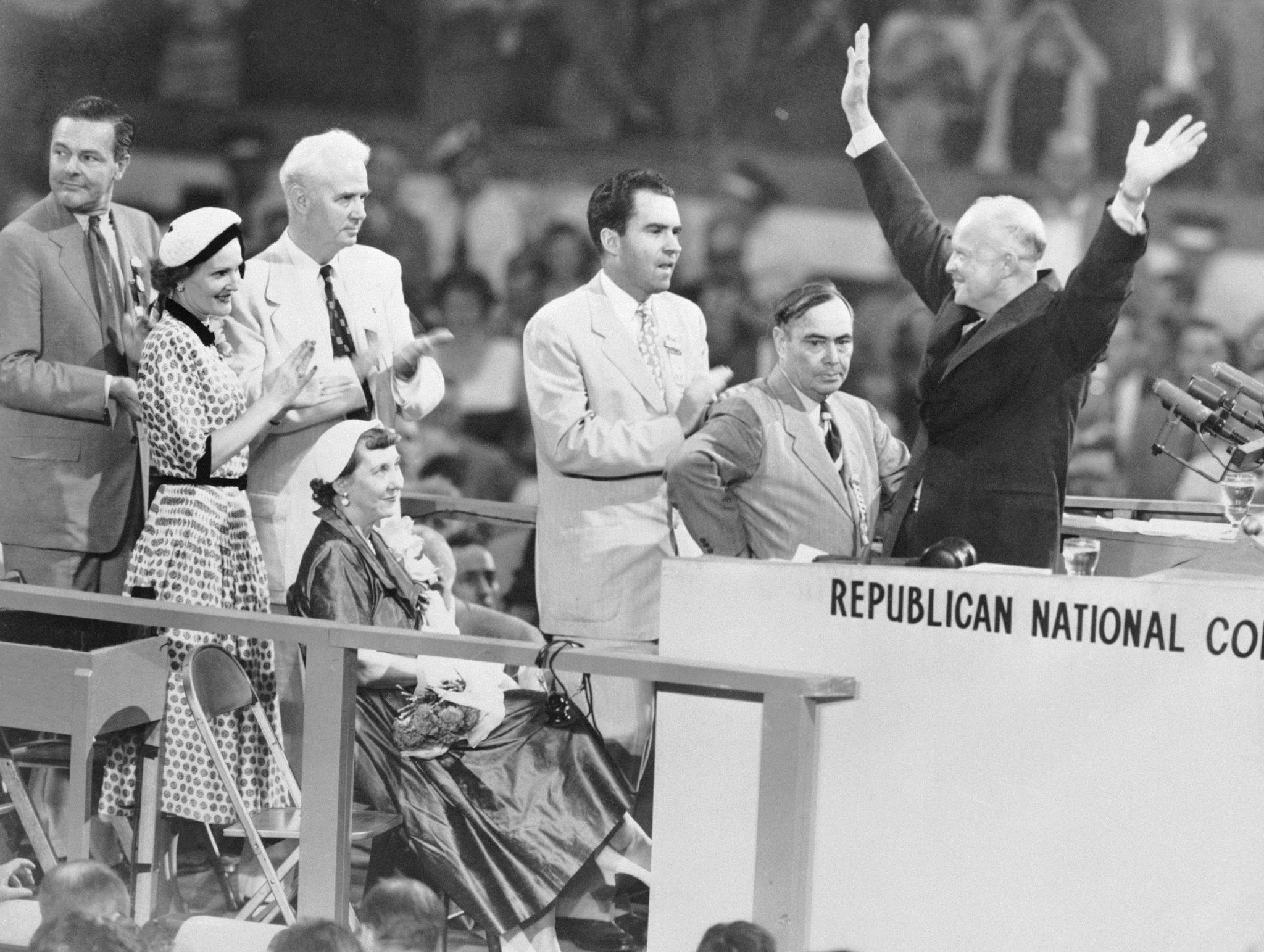
- Republican presidential nominee Dwight D. Eisenhower and vice presidential nominee Richard Nixon and others stand on the convention hall stage

Convention
- Date(s): July 7–11, 1952 (Republican); July 21–26, 1952 (Democratic)
- City: Chicago, Illinois
- Convention hall: International Amphitheatre
- Convention hall capacity: 12,000
- Convention hall type: arena
- Headquarters hotel: Conrad Hilton

In 1952, the Republican National Convention and the Democratic National Convention were both held at the International Amphitheatre in Chicago, Illinois during separate weeks of July. The Republicans met July 7–11, while the Democrats met July 21–26.

The conventions were the first United States presidential nominating conventions to be televised in real-time nationwide. The Democrats adapted their convention last-minute to eliminate several aspects that had come across unflattering for Republicans during their convention. Among advents introduced due to television was the Democrats' debuting a concealed speech teleprompter. The International Amphitheatre was the site of the conventions instead of the even-larger Chicago Stadium arena (the site of the several most recent conventions previously held in the city) due to the assessment of party leaders that it was more suited for television broadcasting. A major undertaking in preparation for the convention was the installation of an expensive and powerful air conditioning system at the International Amphitheatre, making the 1952 conventions the first major party presidential nominating conventions to be held inside of an air conditioned venue.

Other important aspects of the conventions' logistics included arrangement of overnight hotel accommodations, transportation, finances, and entertainment for conventiongoers; as well as security.

== Site selection ==
Chicago cityscape, photographed in 1950

=== Overview of bids ===
Six cities formally submitted bids (Chicago, Illinois; Kansas City, Missouri; Miami, Florida; Philadelphia, Pennsylvania; Los Angeles, California; and San Francisco, California). Initially, Atlantic City, New Jersey and Detroit, Michigan had indicated their interest in hosting, but both abandoned their efforts without submitting a formal bid. Kansas City and Miami only sought to host the Democratic convention, while the four other cities indicated their interest in hosting either or both conventions. Chicago and Philadelphia were the finalist bid cities, with Chicago being selected by both parties.

Finalist bid cities
City	Proposed main venue (capacity)	Previous major party conventions hosted by city	Subsequent major party conventions hosted by city
Chicago, Illinois	Chicago International Amphitheatre (12,000) or Chicago Stadium (20,000)	Democratic: 1864, 1884, 1892, 1896, 1932, 1940, 1944; Republican: 1860, 1868, 1880, 1884, 1888, 1904, 1908, 1912, 1916, 1920, 1932, 1944; Other: 1912 Prog., 1916 Prog.	Democratic: 1956, 1968, 1996, 2024; Republican:1960
Philadelphia, Pennsylvania	Philadelphia Convention Hall (13,000)	Democratic: 1936, 1948; Republican: 1856, 1872, 1900, 1940, 1948; Other: 1848 Whig, 1948 Prog.	Democratic: 2016; Republican: 2000

Other formal bids
City	Previous major party conventions hosted by city	Subsequent major party conventions hosted by city
Kansas City, Kansas –only bid for DNC	Democratic: 1900; Republican: 1928	Republican: 1976
Los Angeles, California	—N/a	Democratic: 1960, 2000
Miami, Florida –only bid for DNC	—N/a	Democratic: 1972; Republican: 1968, 1972
San Francisco, California	Democratic: 1920	Democratic: 1984; Republican: 1956, 1964

Withdrew without formally bidding
City	Previous major party conventions hosted by city	Subsequent major party conventions hosted by city
Atlantic City, New Jersey	—N/a	Democratic: 1964
Detroit, Michigan	—N/a	Republican: 1980

== Scheduling ==
On May 10, 1951 , the seven-member subcommittee of the Republican Party unanimously voted not only to recommend Chicago be selected as the site of convention, but to also recommend that the convention be held on July 21. This was later into the year than the party had ever held a presidential convention, and was seen as likely to face opposition from Republican National Committee members. The subcommittee justified its recommendation of a July date by arguing that the convention should be held after Indiana’s state Republican convention, which was scheduled to commence on June 28. In a compromise two days later, the Republican National Committee voted 88–11 to approve holding the convention on the week of July 7. The July date was the latest that Republicans had ever held their convention. In their previous history, all but two of their previous conventions had been held in June.

At the time, it was typical that Democrats held their convention after the Republicans at a later date than the Republicans. From 1864 through 1952, the Democratic Party had held its convention at a later date than the Republicans in every election except 1888. Republicans had hoped to usurp this norm. By scheduling their convention much later than normal, they had hoped that they might force Democrats to hold their own convention previous to the Republicans. However, Democrats ultimately refused this pressure, and instead scheduled their convention late as well. The Democrats opted to schedule their convention for the week of July 21, two weeks after the Republican convention.

The Republicans were still working on finalizing timetables for the convention proceedings mere days prior to the convention's opening.

== Television broadcasting ==
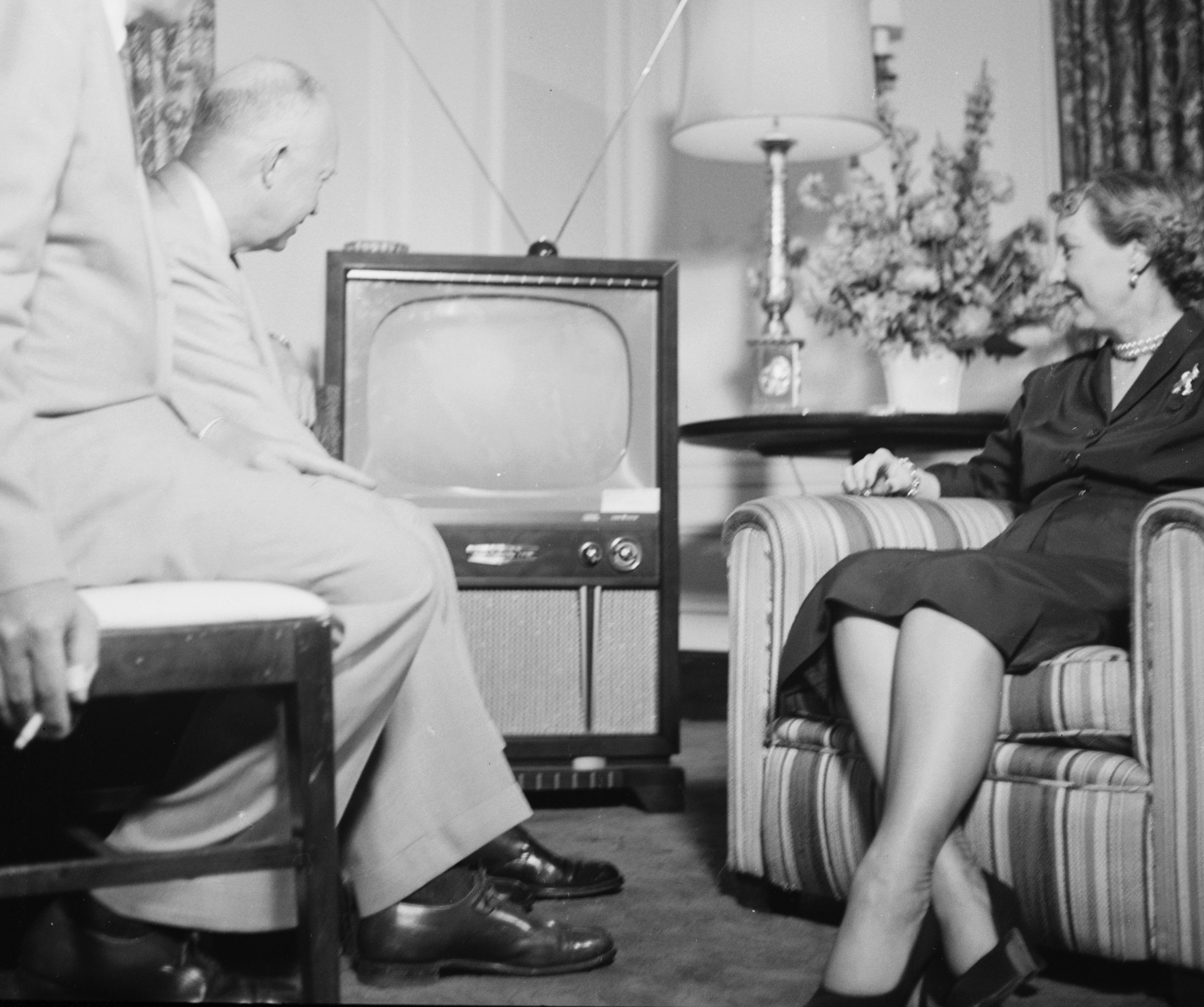
Dwight D. Eisenhower and his wife Mamie watching a television during the Republican convention

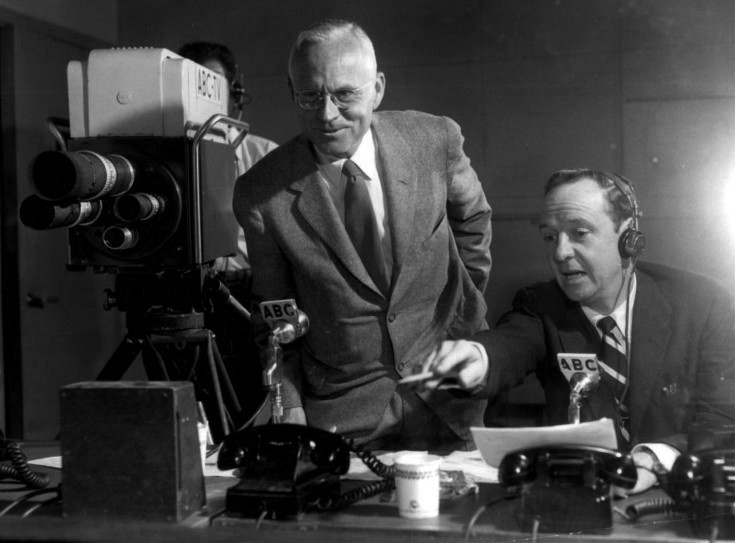
Quincy Howe and John Daly commentating for ABC's convention coverage in 1952

The conventions were the first political conventions to be televised live, coast-to-coast. Previously, since 1924, the primary means which Americans received gavel-to-gavel rolling coverage of presidential nominating conventions had been broadcast radio.

Historian Florencia Pierri observed in 2020,

The 1952 presidential conventions were particularly important moments in the history of television technology...[The conventions featured] the most complex array of television and radio facilities ever assembled. It was the first time the convention would be televised in color and in real time from coast to coast. [NBC's coverage] took 6 weeks of planning, 2 million dollars' worth of equipment, and a 300-person staff, all supplied with the latest equipment.

The main venue for the conventions was moved from the Chicago Stadium arena (where the most recent previous conventions in Chicago had been staged) to the International Amphitheatre upon the judgement of party leaders that the latter was a better-suited venue for television broadcasts. Convention planners were anticipated to schedule more-important events during the evening so that a larger television audience would be viewing live coverage.

The impact of the Republican Convention television broadcasts was an immediate one. After carefully watching the Republican Convention, the Democratic Party made last-minute alterations to their convention held in the same venue to make their broadcast more appealing to television audiences. They constructed a tower in the center of the convention hall to allow for a better shot of the podium, and Democrats exercised more control over camera shots and the conduct of delegates in front of the cameras. While Republican speakers had used a teleprompter that was often visible to television audiences, Democratic speakers were given a teleprompter that was hidden into their lectern. Ahead of the start of their convention, Democrats promised that (based on lessons learned from observing the Republican convention) they would start all sessions within fifteen minutes of their scheduled opening times, and grant a television camera to be set up in a position that would allow a head-on view of the speaker's platform (which was not available to broadcasters during the Republican convention).

== Radio broadcasting ==
Edward R. Murrow provided news reports for the CBS Radio Network. Russ Van Dyke of CBS' Iowa affiliate KRNT also provided reporting from the convention.

Voice of America (VOA), an international radio network funded by the U.S. Department of State, broadcast coverage of convention across the globe. VOA produced broadcasts in 46 different languages, concentrating on those spoken in Iron Curtain nations. VOA's facility at convention was a small recording booth. Dedicated telephone lines relayed what was produced in this booth to VOA's broadcasting headquarters in New York City. VOA would have reporters record content in that both each day in a variety of languages, reporting the stories of interest. Each of its reporters recorded two stories every day of the conventions, which were then transmitted to New York City. Editing work was done in New York City before these stories were broadcast by VOA. The Soviets' own media broadcast radio stories on the convention, portraying the nomination process as being shaped by a "small circle of bosses", with Radio Moscow, referring to American elections as the "false American democracy".

== Telecommunications ==
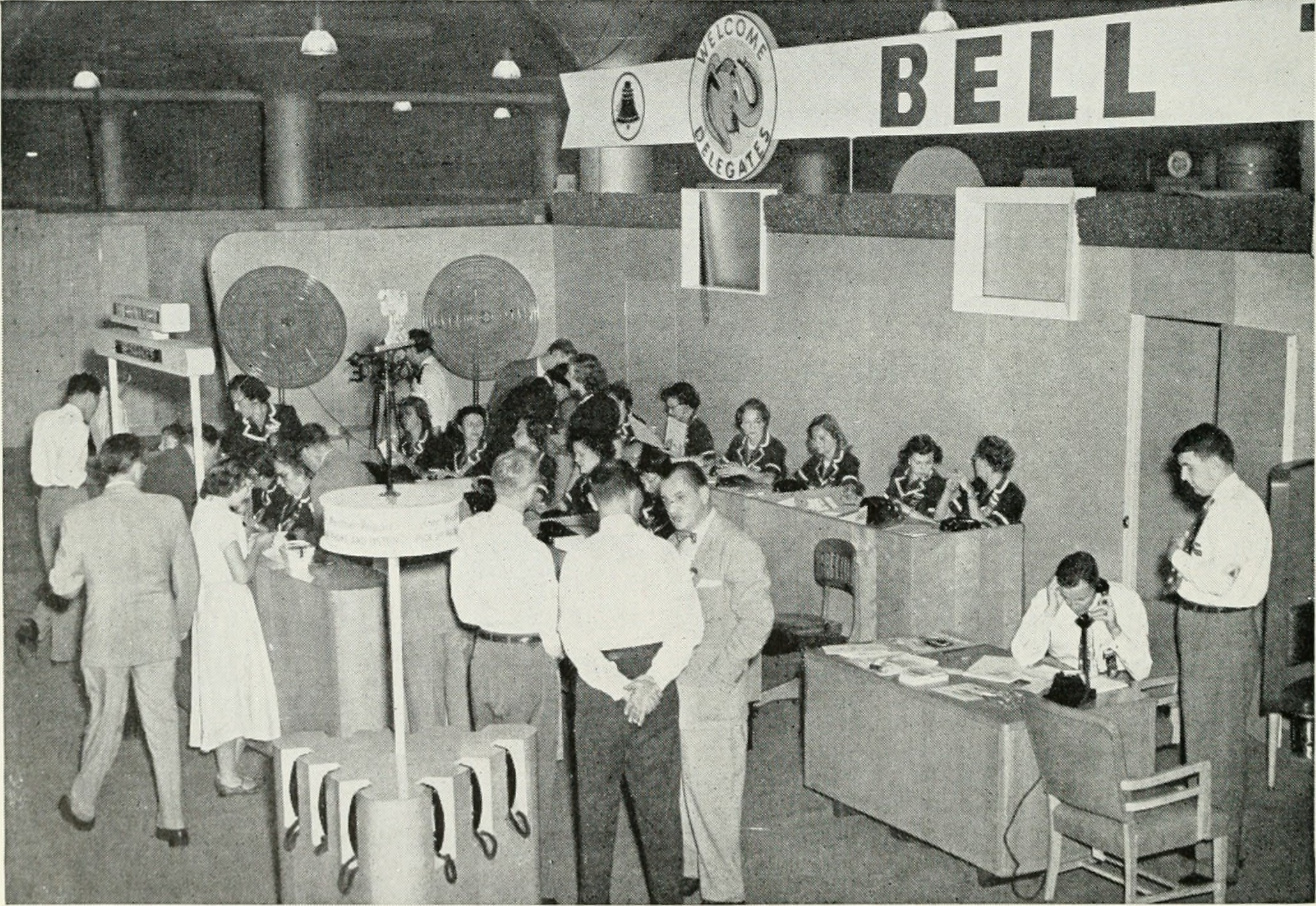
Illinois Bell Telephone Company message center in the convention hall

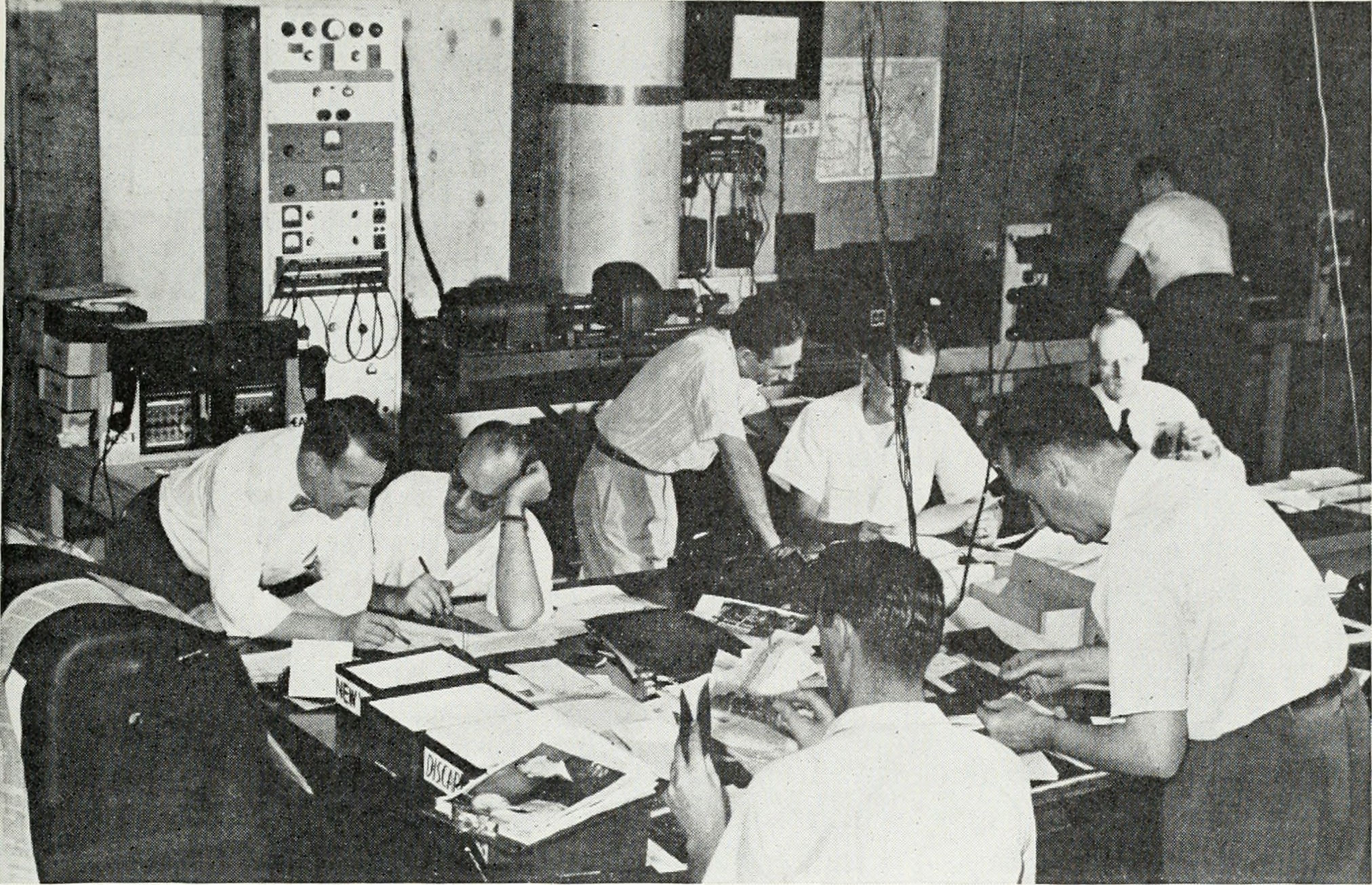
Busy scene of the communication lines being manned in a convention newsroom facility

Telephones being installed at a table on the speaker's platform at the International Amphitheatre, in advance of the conventions

Press photographers capturing the installation of telephone booths on Astor Street ahead of the conventions

An extensive telecommunications infrastructure needed to be established in order to accommodate not only the press (print press, television, and radio), but also to facilitate communications involving delegates and party leaders amid vote-wrangling for platform votes and nomination balloting. Tens of thousands of incoming calls related to the convention were received at the hotels were delegates were housed.

More than 100 public telephones were added to the International Amphitheatre for the conventions. Included in this, the Illinois Bell Telephone Company set up a telephone message center for use by delegates, which also featured walkie-talkie service for use in emergencies.

During both conventions the Conrad Hilton (today known as the Hilton Chicago) received busy telephone traffic, due to its use as both the convention and media headquarters, as well as the location of hotel accommodations for many delegates and reporters. It was reported that during the Republican convention, its telephone switchboards received more traffic than it ever had before; peaking with traffic as high as 4,000 calls in a single hour. In anticipation of the increase in calls being placed from the hotel from during the convention, additional phone booths had been installed for outgoing calls to be made from.

== Convention leadership ==
Charles Hacker served as the Republican convention's chief sergeant-at-arms. Robert A. Taft held sway over arrangements committee for the Republican convention, as evidenced by the arrangement committee's selection of Douglas MacArthur for the convention's keynote speaker (something which Taft's camp preferred). Congressman Joseph W. Martin Jr. served as permanent chairman of the Republican convention.

Jacob M. Arvey served as chairman of the Democratic convention host committee. Neal Roach served as the pre-convention manager overseeing Democratic convention preparations. At the time of the convention, Frank E. McKinney was chairman of the Democratic National Committee and Lawrence Westbrook was assistant chairman. Leslie L. Biffle (the secretary of the United States Senate) served as the convention's sergeant-at-arms.

== Preparation of the International Amphitheatre ==
Interior of the International Amphitheatre arena, photographed in 1948

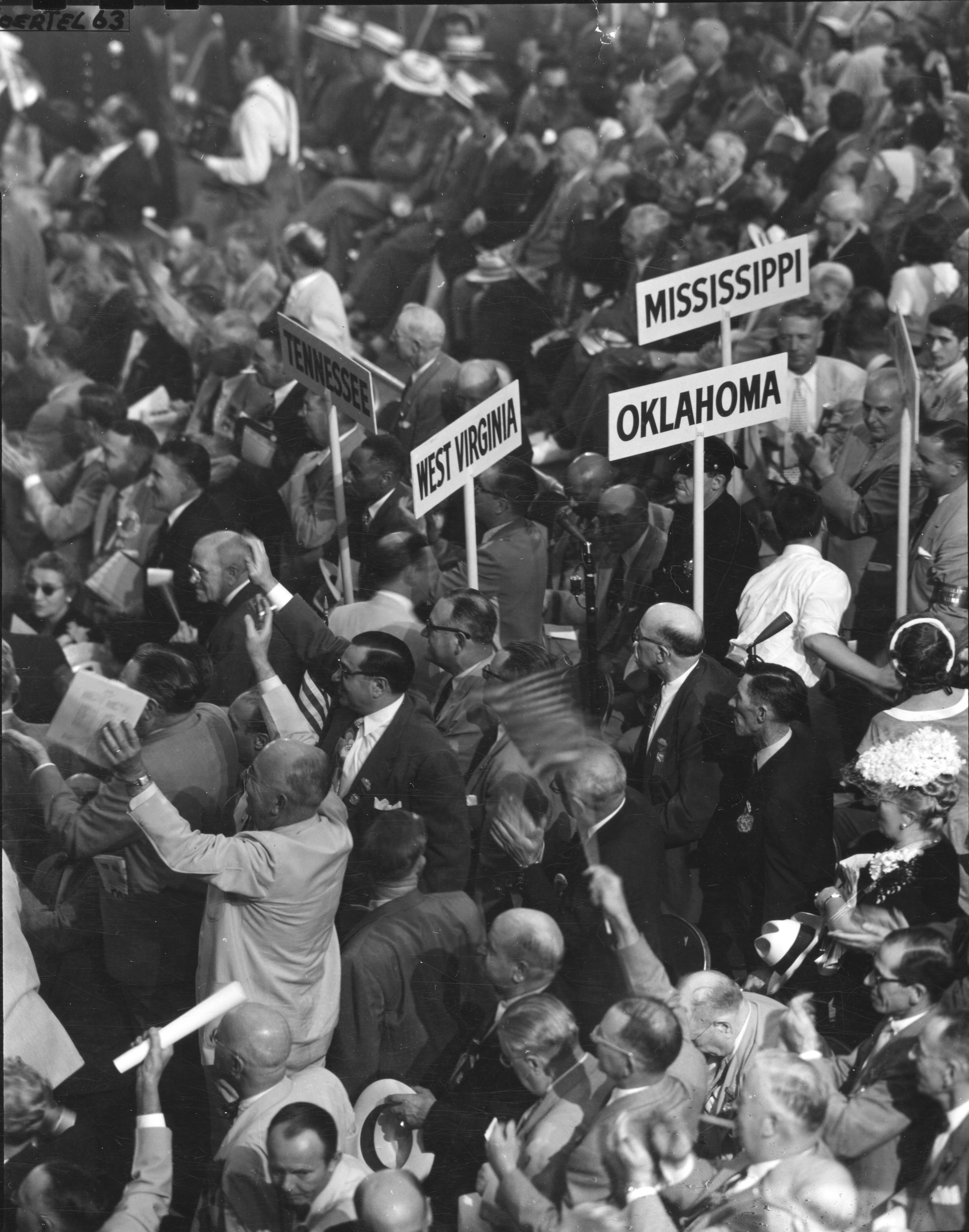
Delegates on the floor during the Republican convention

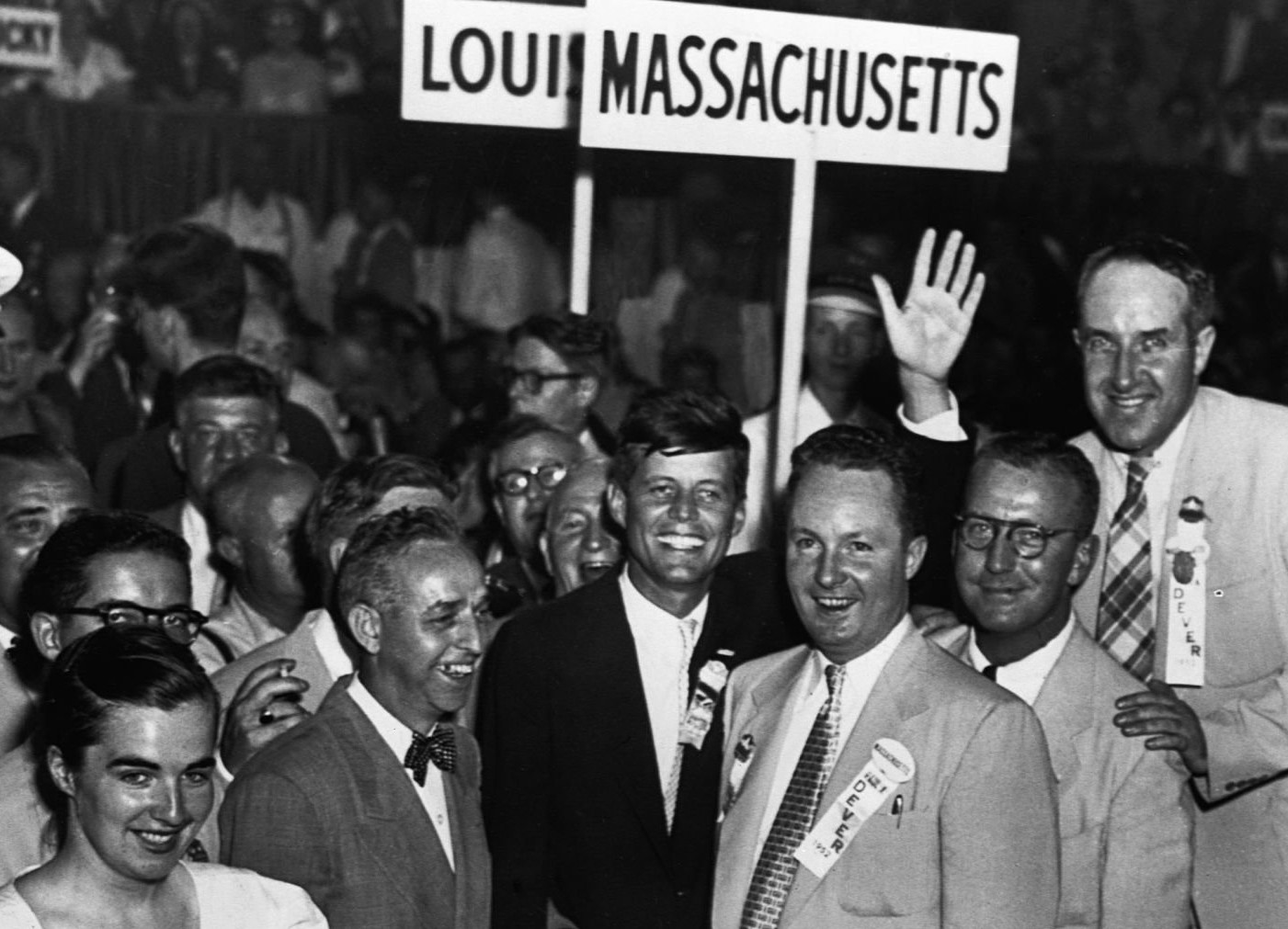
Massachusetts delegates on the convention floor during the Democratic convention, including then-congressman (future president) John F. Kennedy and then-state legislator (future Boston mayor) John F. Collins

=== Venue specs ===
The most recent presidential conventions in Chicago had been held at the Chicago Stadium arena. However, with the new advent of television broadcasting, it was decided to hold the 1952 conventions at the International Amphitheatre arena. While the venue was smaller in capacity than the Chicago Stadium, the leaders of the parties believed that it was better suited for television broadcasting. While it had a lower capacity than the Chicago Stadium, the 12,000 seat capacity International Amphitheatre was still among the world's largest-capacity arenas. It sat 4,500 attendees on the arena floor, and 7,500 in its mezzanine and balcony seats. It had dining facilities that could feed 3,000 individuals simultaneously. The arena portion of the building was 238 feet (73 m) by 123 feet (37 m) and had a ceiling that rose 87 feet (27 m) above the arena floor.

The International Amphitheatre stood (by different measures) 4.5 miles (7.2 km) or 6 miles (9.7 km) southwest of the Chicago Loop (the central business district of Chicago). It was located at the gateway of the Union Stock Yards, at the time that largest stockyard in the world. The arena was owned by the Union Stockyard and Transit Company, who also owned the stockyards. It was expected that the stockyards would be toured by some of the delegates during their convention visit to Chicago.

The venue featured an organ, which was utilized at times during the conventions to provide music.

=== Installation of air conditioning ===
A major improvement made to the arena in preparation for the conventions was the installation of an air conditioning system. The 1952 presidential conventions were the first in history (Note: While Chicago’s Auditorium Theatre (site of the 1888 Republican National Convention) was built with an early air conditioning system, the 1888 Republican Convention was held prior to the completion of the venue's roof structure (which contained the ducts for the air conditioning system), and that convention was therefore not air conditioned.) to be held in an air conditioned venue. The air conditioning system installed by the arena's operator was one of the reasons that the parties chose to hold their conventions there instead of the larger-capacity Chicago Stadium. During the May bid presentations, Philadelphia had promised its venue would be air condition; while Chicago touted plans to have its venue be "naturally" air conditioned.

The arena's air conditioning system, manufactured by Carrier, utilized more than 1 acre (0.40 ha) of cooling coils. The system cost $350,000 to install. It proved advantageous during the Republican convention, when Chicago experienced 95 °F (35 °C) weather. The system was described as providing "cooling equivalent of 2,000,000 pounds of ice daily." Its cooling plant was fed water averaging 60 °F (16 °C) through two wells dug 1,600 feet (490 m) into the ground. The two machines of the cooling system each weighed 11.5 tons and could pump approximately 2,000 US gallons (7,600 L) of cooled water per minute into the system's cooling coils. The system refreshed the arenas air with air that had been filtered, dehumidified, and cooled. It was reported to completely refresh the air inside of the arena 72 times per day and be capable of reducing the temperature inside the arena up to fifteen degrees below those found outdoors.

On July 17, the National Production Authority (NPA) ruled that the Union Stockyard and Transit Company) had illegally used materials in the installation of the system. Approximately 60 tons of steel and approximately 1,000 pounds (450 kg) of copper had been utilized, despite the NPA having rejected the company's application for this amount of material in December 1951. The purchase of the materials was characterized as being purchased on the grey market. While this was caught too late to prevent the installation, the NPA could have potentially taken action to prevent the arena operators from making further use of controlled metals, or could have even recommended criminal charges be brought. They could also have sought legal action to order the system removed or sought an immediate injunction to prevent its further use. All such responses by the NPA were seen as unlikely, particularly any actions that would have prevented its use during the Democratic Convention. The Daily Telegraph & Monday Post noted that such action by an Executive Branch agency ahead of the Democratic convention might have harmed the prospects of a candidate preferred by the Truman Administration prevailing at that convention, as the delegates might harbor greater ire with Truman's federal government if one of the federal agency's were responsible for discomfort during the convention. Instead of such action, the NPA declared that it intended to investigate the matter to see what legal options it had against the Union Stockyard and Transit Company.

While the air conditioning made the interior of the venue comfortable, a unaddressed discomfort for many conventiongoers was the smell outside of it. The pungent smells that emanated from the adjacent Union Stockyards (home to a massive amount of livestock and slaughterhouses), which convention goers had to encounter as their vehicles approached the venue, was considered grotesque by many. This was contrary to assurances from the stockyard ownership, which had released a statement before the Republican convention claiming that, "contrary to popular belief in some quarters, there is no farm oder at the stockyard." The stockyard ownership had assured the public that the convention would not experience an unpleasant odor because their sanitation system was unparalleled, claiming, "the streets of the yard and alleys between pens, as well as the pens, are as clean as those in a fine residential area." Chicago political figures had given pre-convention assurances that any smells related to the stockyards would not be a problem inside the arena, as the air conditioning system would filter them out.

The air conditioning at the venue contributed to the ability of the parties to comfortably hold their conventions at a later-than-usual date, during a hotter month for weather.

=== Other aspects ===
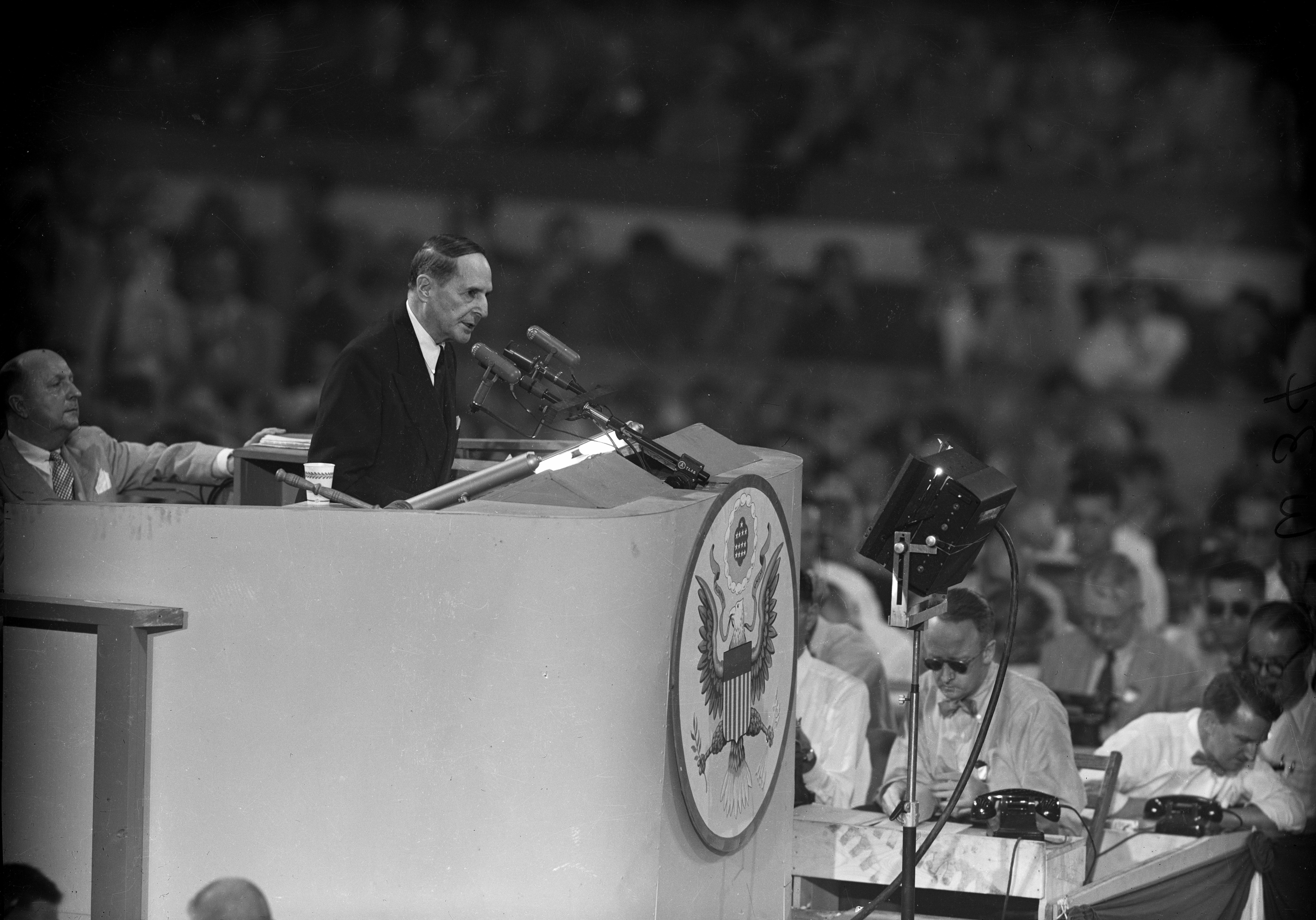
Douglas MacArthur delivering the keynote address at the Republican convention

In preparation for the convention, crews placed delegate chairs on the floor of the arena, constructed an elevated stage for speakers, set up press working space on the floor, and placed platforms for cameras for television, news photography, newsreels. Also constructed within the arena were radio booths.

In late May 1952, the arena was rebranded by its operator as the "Chicago Convention Building & International Ampitheatre" in hopes of attracting further convention business after the presidential conventions. Its manager expressing hope that the air conditioning system installed for the presidential conventions would make the venue attractive for summertime conventions.

The arena was adjacent to the Stock Yards Inn, at the time one of the best-regarded steakhouses in the United States. This was anticipated to be a popular dinning spot for delegates during the convention. Also nearby was the famous Saddle and Sirloin Club steakhouse.

Inside the convention hall, high prices were charged for concessions. This included 75 cents for plain beef sandwiches and 15 cents for Coke (at a time when the standard price for a Coke was 5 cents).

The arena was adorn with blue drapes ahead of the Republican convention. Ahead of the Democratic convention, some decorations were changed. The Democrats, for instance, added portraits of presidents Thomas Jefferson, Andrew Jackson, Woodrow Wilson, Theodore Roosevelt, and Harry S. Truman.

== Ticket distribution ==
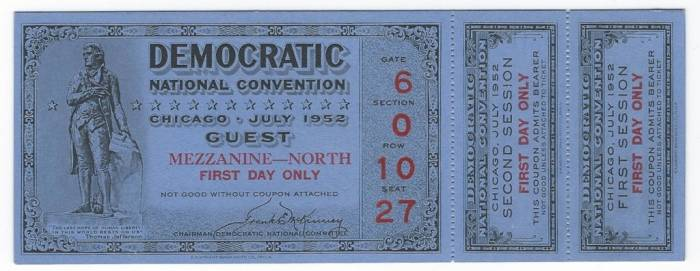
Democratic entrance ticket

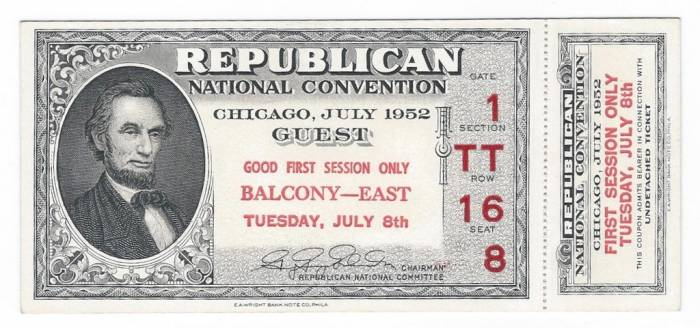
Republican entrance ticket

It was noted that few tickets were able to be made available to members of the general public. For instance, both conventions each only gave the host state of Illinois less than 200 spectator tickets to distribute. The convention hall had a capacity of 12,000. For any general session of the Republican convention, 9,000 seats would be assigned to delegates, alternate delegates, news media, and special guests (such as party leaders, political officeholders, and miscellaneous VIPs), which left only 3,000 seats at any session available for the general public. In mid June, Charles Hacker (chief sergeant-at-arms for the Republican convention) noted that those who had not yet secured tickets to the convention hall would be unlikely to secure them.

== Hotels ==
Busy street scene along State Street outside of the Palmer House Hotel, photographed at some point in 1952

The conventions were anticipated each to attract 20,000 visitors to Chicago (a total of 40,000), therefore requiring a significant number of hotel rooms for overnight accommodation Chicago had a large number of hotels, having more than of 135,000 hotel rooms. The city's hotels included several individual properties containing thousands of guest rooms, including the 2,600-room Conrad Hilton Hotel (the world's largest hotel at the time), the 2,300-room Palmer House, the 1,000 room Congress Hotel, and the Morrison Hotel (the tallest hotel in the United States at the time). The Greater Chicago Hotel Association had 118 member hotels in the Chicago market, including suburban hotels.

On the opening day of the Republican convention, hotel operators estimated that for every delegate there were 30 non-delegate convention-related visitors, estimating that there were roughly 1,000 delegates and 30,000 other visitors drawn by the convention. The Greater Chicago Hotel Association reported in the month prior to the conventions that hotels in the Chicago Loop (the central business district of Chicago) were booked at 100% occupancy during the conventions. Even with the rush of visitors to Chicago for the conventions, the Greater Chicago Hotel Association also noted that the city's overall hotels (including non-downtown hotels) still had 1,118 vacant rooms on the first day of the Republican convention and 1,518 vacant rooms on the first day of the Democratic convention.

The housing committees of each convention coordinated hotel reservations for delegates and many other conventiongoers. By mid-June the Republican convention's housing staff assigned 10,000 rooms for various convention guests, most being located in well-known hotels in or near the Chicago Loop. While their hotel bookings were arranged for them, delegates still needed to pay for the expense of their lodging, in addition to the expense of their transportation and meals. Additionally, delegates were required to pay a portion of their state delegation's expenses, such as stationary and the booking of a headquarters room for their meetings. It was estimated ahead of the convention that Iowa's delegates might each need to pay as much as $1,000 in order to attend the convention.

Even before it was known whether president Truman's intended to attend the convention, a sizable number of rooms had already been tentatively reserved at the Blackstone Hotel for him and those that he would be accompanied by if he attended.

=== State delegation headquarters ===
State delegation headquarters hotels
Hotel	Republican convention		Democratic convention	
Hotel	Delegations	Cite	Delegations	Cite
Atlantic Hotel (Note: The, since demolished, Atlantic Hotel was at other times in its history known as the "Kaiserhof Hotel", "Wyoming Hotel", and "Gore Hotel")	Maryland		—N/a	—N/a
Bismarck Hotel (Note: known today as the "Allegro Royal Sonesta Hotel Chicago")	Wisconsin		Minnesota	
Bismarck Hotel	Wisconsin		North Dakota	
Bismarck Hotel	Wisconsin		South Dakota	
Bismarck Hotel	Wisconsin		Wisconsin	
Hotel Chicagoan	Alabama (joint–HQ)		—N/a	—N/a
Congress Hotel (Note: known today as the "Congress Plaza Hotel")	Iowa		Alabama (joint-HQ)	
Congress Hotel	Michigan (joint–HQ)		Georgia	
Congress Hotel	Ohio		Idaho	
Congress Hotel	Pennsylvania		Louisiana	
Congress Hotel	Pennsylvania		Mississippi	
Congress Hotel	Pennsylvania		Rhode Island	
Congress Hotel	Pennsylvania		Washington	
Congress Hotel	Pennsylvania		District of Columbia	
Conrad Hilton (Note: known today as the "Hilton Chicago")	Alabama (joint–HQ)		Connecticut	
Conrad Hilton	Minnesota (joint–HQ)		New York (joint-HQ)	
Conrad Hilton	New Jersey		North Carolina	
Conrad Hilton	New Mexico (joint-HQ)		Oklahoma	
Conrad Hilton	Oklahoma		Virginia	
Conrad Hilton	Tennessee (joint-HQ)		Utah	
Conrad Hilton	Utah (joint-HQ)		Wyoming	
Conrad Hilton	West Virginia (joint-HQ)		Wyoming	
Croydon Hotel (Note: known today as the "21c Museum Hotel Chicago by MGallery")	North Carolina		—N/a	—N/a
Drake Hotel (Note: known today as "The Drake, a Hilton Hotel")	—N/a	—N/a	Nebraska	
Drake Hotel	—N/a	—N/a	New Mexico	
Drake Hotel	—N/a	—N/a	New York (joint–HQ)	
Edgewater Beach Hotel	Connecticut (joint–HQ)		New York (joint–HQ)	
Harrison Hotel (Note: known today as the "Harrison Hotel, the Travelodge Hotel Downtown Chicago")	Indiana		Indiana (joint–HQ)	
Knickerbocker (Note: known today as the "Millennium Hotel Knickerbocker Chicago")	Arizona		Indiana (joint–HQ)	
Knickerbocker	California		New Jersey (joint-HQ	
La Salle Hotel	Illinois		Alabama (joint–HQ)	
La Salle Hotel	Kentucky		Delaware (Note: one week prior to the Democratic convention, Delaware Democrats shifted their convention headquarters from the originally-planned to the Drake Hotel to the La Salle. The state's entire delegation (including Governor Elbert N. Carvel) stayed at the La Salle, with the exception of U.S. senator J. Allen Frear Jr. (who instead stayed at the Conrad Hilton).)	
La Salle Hotel	Montana		Kentucky	
La Salle Hotel	Virginia		Maryland	
La Salle Hotel	Virginia		South Carolina	
La Salle Hotel	Virginia		West Virginia	
La Salle Hotel	Virginia		Panama Canal Zone	
Morrison Hotel	Colorado		Florida	
Morrison Hotel	Connecticut (joint-HQ)		Illinois	
Morrison Hotel	Florida		Indiana (joint-HQ)	
Morrison Hotel	Georgia		Nevada	
Morrison Hotel	Missouri		Oregon	
Morrison Hotel	Nebraska		Pennsylvania	
Morrison Hotel	Nevada		Territory of Alaska	
Morrison Hotel	North Dakota		U.S. Virgin Islands	
Morrison Hotel	South Dakota		U.S. Virgin Islands	
Morrison Hotel	Tennessee (joint–HQ)		U.S. Virgin Islands	
Morrison Hotel	Texas		U.S. Virgin Islands	
Morrison Hotel	Utah (joint-HQ)		U.S. Virgin Islands	
Morrison Hotel	Wyoming		U.S. Virgin Islands	
Morrison Hotel	Territory of Alaska		U.S. Virgin Islands	
Palmer House (Note: known today as the "Palmer House Hilton")	Delaware		Arizona	
Palmer House	Idaho		Arkansas	
Palmer House	Iowa		California	
Palmer House	Kansas		Colorado	
Palmer House	Louisiana		Iowa	
Palmer House	Oregon		Kansas	
Palmer House	Massachusetts		Massachusetts	
Palmer House	Michigan (joint–HQ)		New Jersey (joint-HQ)	
Palmer House	Vermont		Texas	
Palmer House	West Virginia (joint–HQ)		Territory of Hawaii	
Palmer House	Territory of Hawaii		Puerto Rico	
Sheraton Hotel (Note: known today as the "InterContinental Chicago Magnificent Mile")	New Hampshire		Maine	
Sheraton Hotel	District of Columbia		Montana	
Sheraton Hotel	District of Columbia		New Mexico	
Sheraton Hotel	District of Columbia		Vermont	
Sherman House	Arkansas		Michigan	
Sherman House	Maine		Missouri	
Sherman House	Minnesota (joint–HQ)		New Hampshire	
Sherman House	Mississippi		New York (joint-HQ)	
Sherman House	New Mexico (joint–HQ)		Ohio	
Sherman House	New York		Tennessee	
Sherman House	South Carolina		U.S. Virgin Islands	
Sherman House	Washington		U.S. Virgin Islands	

By 1952, it was considered a "tradition" for the home state Illinois delegation to stay at the La Salle Hotel when Republican conventions were hosted in Chicago, and this tradition was kept in 1952. While no Republican delegation was housed at the Ambassador hotels (Ambassador East and Ambassador West), Blackstone Hotel, or Drake Hotel, the Republican convention set aside the blocks of rooms they had reserved at these hotels to house non-delegate VIPs. Additionally, the Ambassador East (a famously dog-friendly establishment) erected a "Pup Room" space for dogs brought to Chicago by visiting delegates, located adjacent to its famous Pump Room restaurant.

Republican convention delegation headquarters hotels and other key facilities (overlayed atop modern street map)
Democratic convention delegation headquarters hotels and other key facilities (overlayed atop modern street map)

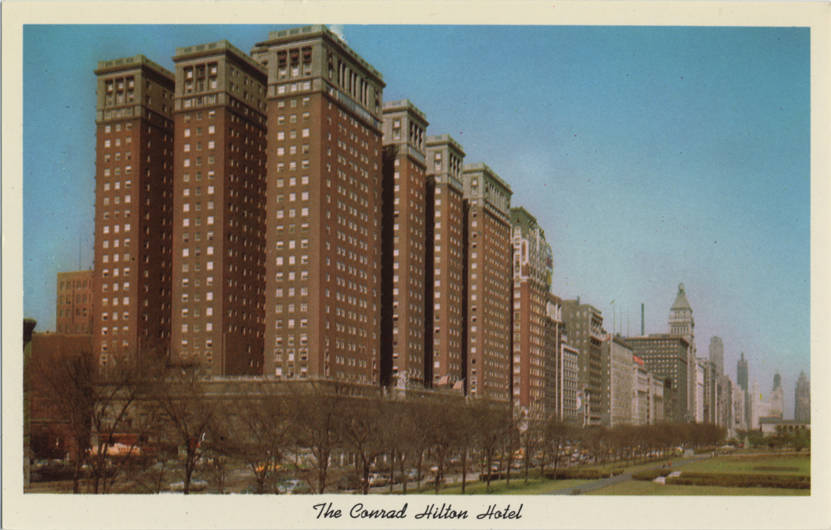
1950s postcard of the Conrad Hilton Hotel (today known as the Hilton Chicago). The hotel served as the headquarter hotel of both conventions, and was also the site of most candidates' campaign headquarters during the convention. In 1952, it was considered the largest hotel in the world, having 3,000 rooms.

Several of the hotels used in 1953 had previously been used to house delegations at earlier conventions held in the city.

Several of the hotels were used to house delegations at later conventions held in the city. During the 1956 DNC, 1960 RNC and 1968 DNC, the Conrad Hilton again served as headquarters hotel. During the 1960 RNC, the Bismarck Hotel, Drakle Hotel, Conrad Hilton Hotel, Congress Hotel, Knickerbocker Hotel, La Salle Hotel, Morrison Hotel, Sheraton Hotel, and Sherman House were used again to house state delegations. During the 1996 DNC, delegates were again housed at the Ambassador West, Bismarck, Conrad Hilton, Congress, Palmer House, and Knickerbocker. During the 2024 DNC, the Bismarck, Conrad Hilton, and Palmer House were used to house delegates.

=== Republican candidate and campaign headquarters ===
Eisenhower located his convention headquarters in the Normandie lounge and west ballroom of the Conrad Hilton Hotel. Taft's headquarters occupied the hotel's main ballroom. Taft's campaign committee also operated a separate convention headquarters at the Morrison Hotel. Earl Warren's headquarters were located in hotel suites at the Conrad Hilton. Harold Stassen was originally going have his headquarters located at the adjacent Blackstone, but ultimately opened them inside of the Conrad Hilton as well. The Associated Press described Eisenhower, Taft, and Stassen as having "elaborate headquarters where their supporters can pick up buttons, literature, and a shot of enthusiasm," and described Warren's headquarters as "not quite so fancy". Eisenhower had a suite at the Blackstone.

A small fire occurred in the Conrad Hilton during the Republican convention, giving rise to gossip that Taft's campaign was burning evidence of chicanery used to secure Texas delegates. For weeks before the convention, Eisenhower's campaign had alleged that there had been a "steal" by Taft in Texas' selection of delegates.

Eisenhower's personal quarters during the convention were instead in a suite at the nearby Blackstone Hotel. It is from this fifth floor suite that Eisenhower watched the television coverage of the roll call in which he was nominated. Taft's personal quarters were in the presidential suite at the Congress Hotel.

=== Democratic candidate and campaign headquarters ===
Kefauver located his headquarters at the Conrad Hilton Hotel. When he arrived in Chicago on July 16, Kefauver held a crowded press conference at the hotel. while Kefauver located his Democratic convention headquarters at the Conrad Hilton Hotel, the Sherman House Hotel housed a separate headquarters for the New Jersey Citizens' Committee for Kefauver (a group backing his candidacy). Nine days ahead of the convention, Governor Richard B. Russell formally set up his campaign's headquarters on the ninth floor of the Conrad Hilton, including repurposing space that Taft's campaign had utilized weeks earlier during the Republican convention. Robert S. Kerr, W. Averell Harriman, and other aspiring presidential candidates also had headquarters at the Conrad Hilton.

While Governor Adlai Stevenson II had not made himself a candidate prior to the convention (and claimed outright that he would refuse to be one), a campaign quarters was set up before the convention on the Conrad Hilton's 15th floor by those seeking to draft him. Those leading an effort to nominate India Edwards as vice president also opened a headquarters on the third floor of the hotel.

=== Conrad Hilton (Hilton Chicago) as convention headquarters ===
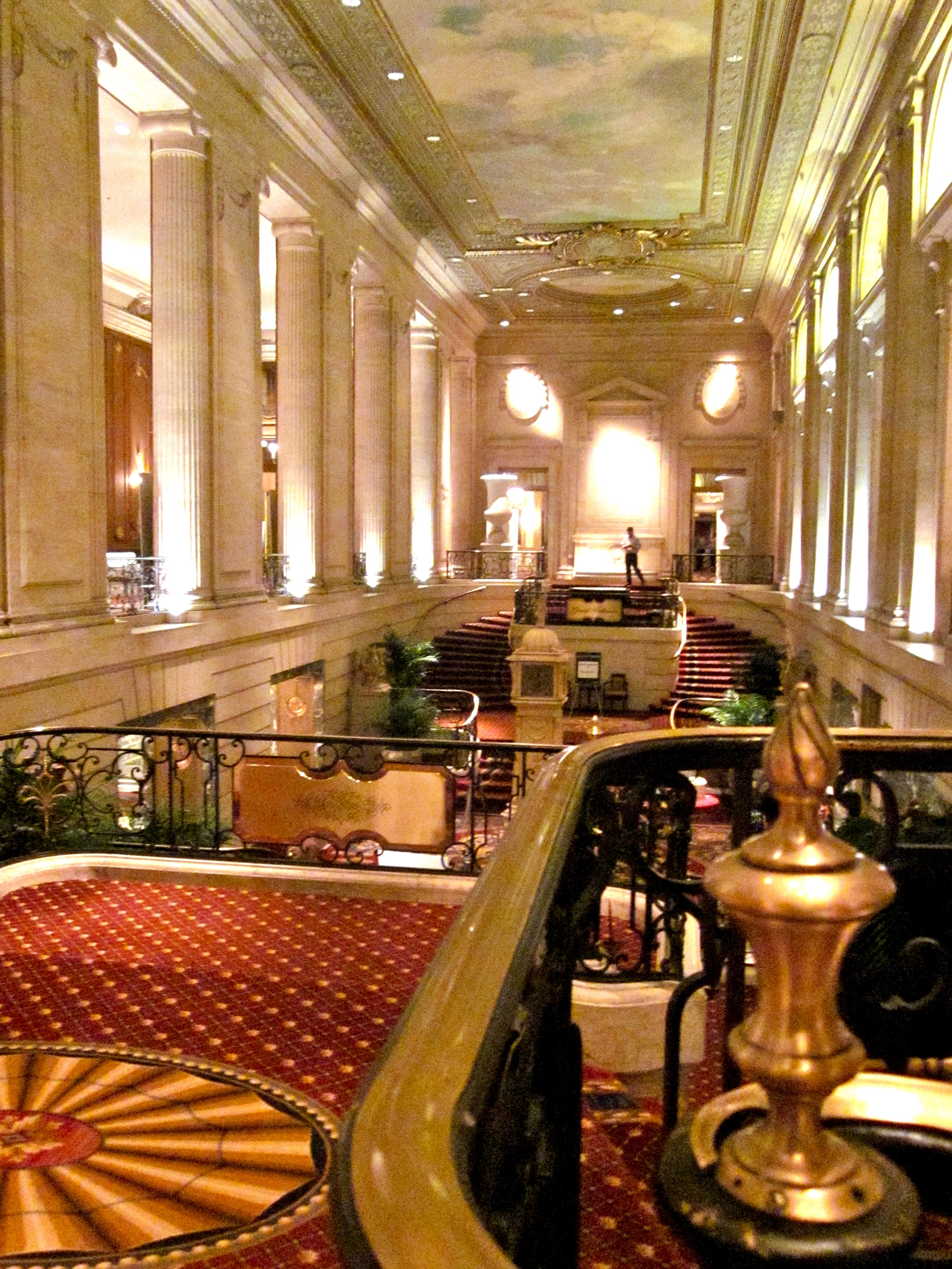
2011 photograph of the hotel's lobby

The Conrad Hilton Hotel (today known as the "Hilton Chicago") served as the RNC convention headquarters hotel as well as the DNC convention headquarters hotel. At the time, it was largest hotel in the world. As the headquarters hotel, it served as a major hub of important activities during both conventions. Additionally, it served as the headquarters hotel for a number of state delegations. Even though the hotel (previously known as "The Stevens") was now under the ownership and branding of hotel magnate Conrad Hilton and his hotel company, many convention attendees still referred to the hotel by its previous name. The Conrad Hilton's management reported during the Republican convention that 2,900 of its 3,000 rooms were being were being occupied by politicians or reporters.

The Democrats allocated much more space at the hotel to its women's division than the Republicans had allotted to its women's division. During the Republican convention, that party's women's division was only given a single room in the hotel's basement. By contrast, during the Democratic convention, its women's convention was given an entire wing of twelve rooms on an upper floor of the hotel, a large workspace which featured prime views of Lake Michigan.

As a publicity stunt, during the Democratic Convention, long shot presidential contender Oscar Ewing hired trapeze artists to perform in the hotel lobby to urge delegates to "swing to Ewing".

==== Media headquarters ====
The hotel's exhibition hall housed the operations of major radio and television networks. A large amount of space was given to radio broadcasters. A press headquarters was housed in the hotel exhibition hall. The setup required an extensive number of cables for telephone lines, as well as an extensive amount of equipment such as teletype printers. The Democratic National lasted longer than the hotel's management had anticipated, and they began to oust the press from this space on the morning of July 26, as it had been reserved for a July 27 jewelry convention. This resulted in the media that had been working out of this space moving into the press room at the International Amphitheatre for the remainder of the convention. Associated Press, International News Service, and United Press all reserved a large amount of workspace at the hotel. Western Union (a telegraph company) also had a large work area with typewriters for use by reporters wishing to relay their stories by telegraph.

In a moment of levity during the Democratic convention, a mule (in likely reference to the donkey mascot often used to represent the party) was brought into a press workroom in the basement level of the hotel and was interviewed by some reporters on his "prediction" for presidential balloting.

==== Congress Hotel as venue for committee meetings ====
During the Republican convention, the Congress Hotel (today known as the Congress Plaza Hotel) was the venue for one of the most notable party functions: the meetings of the conventions' rules committees and credentials committee. The credentials committee held its meetings in the 1,000-seat "Gold Room" ballroom of the hotel, with some deliberations taking place in smaller rooms.

During the Democratic convention, the platform committee held its hearings in one of the medium sized ballrooms of the hotel. These hearings were open to the media and spectators. The Democrats held their credentials committee meeting in the south ballroom of the Conrad Hilton.

== Security ==
More than 2,000 police were anticipated to be involved in some capacity in maintaining order in Chicago during the conventions. A select elite force was assigned to guard the International Amphitheatre during the convention. The Associated Press described there being "scores of policemen inside and outside of the convention hall" during the Republican convention. The Chicago Police Department was arguably more experienced than any other department in the United States at providing security during major party conventions.

The United Press reported that, ahead of the convention, known pickpockets, prostitutes, conmen were rounded up by police and brought to a "show-up" where they were threatened to leave town during the convention or face heavier-than-usual sentences if arrested and convicted. It was also reported that police specialists were assigned to patrol red light districts on North Clark Street, South State Street, and West Madison Street which featured striptease joints notorious for patrons occasionally having their drinks spiked.

== Transportation ==
=== Inter-city ===
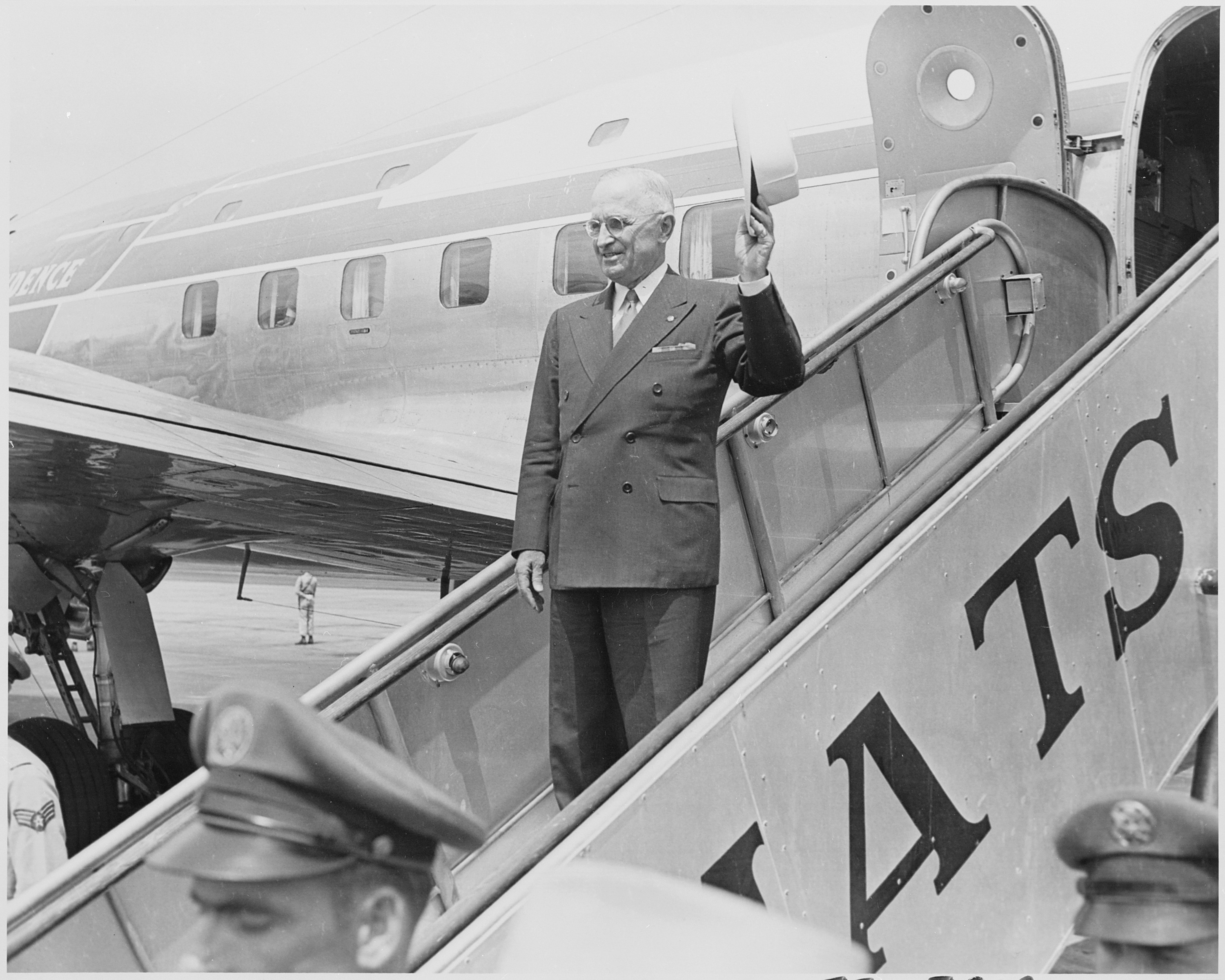
President Harry S. Truman boarding his flight from Washington, D.C. to Chicago for the Democratic convention

Chicago was highly connected to much of the nation both by passenger railways and passenger airlines. Railways and airlines alike sought to profit off of their services to the city during the convention.

Some delegates and prominent individuals traveled to Chicago by airplane (such as Eleanor Roosevelt and incumbent president Harry S. Truman in their travel to the Democratic convention). Taft arrived at the Republican convention by airplane, landing at Midway Airport. Illinois governor Adali Stevenson II (who had been resisting pre-convention efforts to draft him as the party's nominee) arrived in Chicago on a July 18 flight from Springfield (the Illinois state capital) to Chicago's Meigs Field. Upon landing, he gave comments to reporters expressing strong disinterest in being the party's presidential nominee.

Many conventiongoers arrived by railroad. En route to the convention, Eisenhower conducted a whistle-stop train tour between Denver, Colorado and Chicago. Additionally, the delegation from Oregon arrived in Chicago via the Empire Builder train serving Chicago Union Station. Chicago was highly accessible to other parts of the nation by both modes. Other convention visitors arrived by road transport.

Locations of key intercity transit facilities in Chicago at the time of the convention (overlayed atop of a modern street map of Chicago)

=== Local ===
In the lead-up to the conventions, the roads used for travel between The Loop and the International Amphitheatre were rebuilt. $2 million was spent by the city of Chicago in preparation for the conventions on improvements to street lights traffic lights along the primary roads that would be taken to access the convention hall.

Many delegates were transported between their hotels and the convention hall by bus. The Ford Motor Company donated several hundred automobiles for use in transporting delegates to the conventions. The vehicles were collectively valued at over $500,000. The International Amphitheatre had adjacent parking for 4,000 automobiles, and during the convention the parking lot was lit by floodlights and no fee was charged for conventiongoers to utilize it.

Both municipal rail systems operated by the Chicago Transit Authority (CTA) at the time served the International Amphitheatre. Streetcars stopped at Halsted and South 42nd Streets. Rapid transit trains of the Chicago "L" served the Stock Yards branch. However, The Register-Guard noted that these transit routes were not well-understood by out-of-town visitors, noting that the city maps that delegates were provided with were difficult to understand and that it was difficult for conventiongoers to discern the routes they would need to take in order to use these systems as a means of traveling between their hotels and the convention hall. Some delegates encountered difficulties finding their way between the convention hall and downtown hotels.

Months before the convention, Chicago had begun a pilot experiment with converting east-west streets in the Chicago Loop into one-way streets while maintaining two-way traffic on north-south thoroughfares.

1,100 traffic police were expected to handle traffic during the convention. Those that were considered best officers were to be assigned to primary routes between the downtown hotels and the International Amphitheatre.

On the eve of the Republican convention, prestigious downtown portions of Michigan Avenue were reported to be teeming with so activity from convention visitors that International Press Service reported, "you might have mistaken it for a carnival midway."

The Washington Star correspondents reported the anecdote that on the first day of convention that their taxi driver to the convention hall had been unaware of where in the city the convention was being held.

Former locations of the International Amphitheatre and its nearest public transit stations (overlayed atop of a modern street map)

== Municipal beautification ==
In order to improve the appearance of the city's traffic police force, the city's traffic police were ordered by traffic police chief Michael Ahern to adhere to a list of rules that were described as "stressing neatness and courtesy". These rules were read daily to the city's traffic police force during their morning roll calls beginning the month prior to the conventions. The rules forbade baggy uniforms, unpolished buttons, unpolished shoes, and unpressed shirts from being worn. It also forbade the police from lounging while on duty. Police were also instructed to address delegates and important convention visitors (such as elected officials) as "sir", and not to address them with informalities such as "bud" and "chum".

Despite efforts by the city to put its best face forward to convention visitors, travel between the city's downtown hotels and the convention's arena still enabled visitors with glimpses of unpleasant urban realities. Some street routes between the downtown and the arena took visitors through several African-American neighborhoods and other minority-predominant neighborhoods that had experienced the brunt of impacts from disinvestment and urban decay. A contemporary wire from the United Press reported,

Delegates and visitors to the conventions will see the city's seamy side. One route from the swank lakefront hotels will take them through the teeming Negro tenements of the South Side. Another will take them through them through the Halsted Street "melting pot" with shabby buildings, hot pavements, and polyglot population.

== Related events in Chicago for the Republican convention ==
=== Candidate arrival celebrations and pre-convention receptions ===
Ahead of the Republican convention, on July 5 (the day that Eisenhower and Taft both arrived in the city to prepare for their convention floor fight), both candidates' arrivals were met with large crowds and followed by parades escorting them to their convention headquarters at the Conrad Hilton Hotel. When Eisenhower's whistlestop tour train (which had originated in Colorado) arrived at the Chicago and North Western Terminal, it was met by a crowd of between 7,000 and 10,000. Taft's flight was greeted at Midway Airport by a crowd of between 3,500 and 4,000. After his arrival, an honor guard accompanied Eisenhower and his wife, Mamie, to a veterans luncheon where directors of the 82d Airborne veterans organization and honored guests dined with Eisenhower. Later that day, Eisenhower supporters held a rally at the Blackstone Theatre.

The following day (the eve of the convention), both Eisenhower and Taft hosted delegates at receptions. Both receptions took place at the Conrad Hilton at different times. Eisenhower's reception was held between 3 and 6pm local time, while Taft's was held between 8 and 10pm. Immediately preceding his reception oat the Conrad Hilton, Taft's schedule included a 7:30pm meeting with the Iowa delegation at the Palmer House.

=== Eisenhower nomination celebration outside of Blackstone Hotel ===
After Eisenhower secured the Republican nomination, a large crowd of supporters (approximately 10,000, per the estimation of the city's police commissioner) gathered outside of the Blackstone Hotel (where Eisenhower was lodging). The crowd began to assemble as soon as he was nominated. While awaiting an appearance by Eisenhowers, this crowd rehearsed a song celebrating his wife, lyrics for which had been distributed to the crowd by hotel bellboys and others. The singing was led by Fred Waring and the Purdue University Glee Club. As the crowd gathered, town paper fell from the hotel building as celebratory confetti. More than an hour after his nomination, Eisenhower addressed the crowd from a platform that had been set up for him.

Before addressing this crowd, Eisenhower had met with Taft at Taft's campaign headquarters in the Conrad Hilton Hotel. It was there, in front of news cameras and reporters, that Taft pledged to support Eisenhower in the general election. Taft had requested this meeting when he congratulated Eisenhower by telephone.

== Related events in Chicago for the Democratic convention ==
=== Women's events ===
The Democratic convention had 525 female delegates and alternate delegates, as well as 54 national committeewomen. Tasked as the official hostess for female delegates and charged with providing for the arrangement of the female officials attending the convention was Elizabeth A. Conkey, a leading Democratic National Committee figure from Illinois. She had performed the same role at two previous Democratic National Conventions. She organized a July 19 party at the Arlington Park racetrack sponsored by the Illinois Federation of Democratic Women, as well as a post-party cocktail event and dinner at the track's post and Paddock Club facilities. She also organized a July 20 formal dinner party at the Palmer House for more than 2,000 democratic women, with Eleanor Roosevelt, Eugenie Anderson, Perle Mesta, and Georgia Neese Clark as speakers. Other events for women included fashion tea events held at the city's major department stores during the convention, as well as a July 22 and July 23 breakfasts hosted by the women's division of the Democratic National Committee.

== Counter-events held in Chicago ==
=== Progressive National Convention ===
Just as they had in 1948, the Progressive Party (a third party) held its convention in the same city as the two major parties. However, unlike its 1948 convention, the party's 1952 convention was a minor affair. While the 1948 convention generated significant excitement and was held in the same arena that the major party conventions, by 1952 the party had become a rump party and held its convention in a smaller venue.

While the party had already agreed on its presidential ticket at an earlier party meeting held in Chicago in March, the party convened a three-day formal nominating convention in Chicago on July 4. This nominating convention featured 2,000 the city and was held at the Ashland Boulevard Auditorium on the West Side of Chicago.

The party successfully petitioned the FCC to order radio and television networks to grant and facilitate airtime of its nominee's acceptance speeches, taking advantage of the equal time rule. The convention concluded on July 6, the eve of the Republican convention.

== Entertainment offerings in Chicago during the conventions ==
Ahead of the conventions, the Chicago Convention bureau estimated that convention visitors would spend an estimated $650,000 on admission to entertainment venues (including theaters, sporting venues, and nightclubs) and additional $350,000 on alcoholic beverages.

At the time of conventions, productions of the plays The Moon Is Blue, Guys and Dolls, and Bell, Book, and Candle were being performed in the city. The latter production was starring Joan Bennett and Zachary Scott.

At Chicago's best-known nightclub was the Chez Paree, and owner Dave Halper persuaded comedian Jimmy Durante to extend his residency (which began July 15) through the end of the conventions. During each conventions, Durante made comedic efforts to win the nominations for himself. Despite being an admitted staunch Democrat, he first attempted to receive the Republican nomination, and later attempted to receive the Democratic nomination. His "campaign" included numerous op-eds that he wrote during the conventions for the Chicago Herald American, which were distributed nationally by the International News Service.

During the convention, the Edgewater Beach Hotel hosted a musician revue by Jimmy Dorsey and Tommy Dorsey in its Beachwalk and a complimenting floor show in the Marine dining room. The Palmer House hosted a nightly revue by musician Felix Knight, which featured the accompaniment of Dorothy Hild-choreographed dancers. The Conrad Hilton's Boulevard Room offered an ice show (a frequent entertainment offering in that space, at the time) with music by Frankie Masters.

Chicago had several striptease shows at venues along North Clark Street, North Rush Street, West Madison Street, and South State Street; though a local crackdown on indecency in recent years had made these shows tamer than they had been previously.

Chicago was known for its plentiful fine dining. The Stock Yards Inn, one of the nation's best steakhouses, was adjacent to the convention hall. Among Chicago's fine seafood restaurants were Ireland's (located north of The Loop) and the Boston Oyster House (located in the Morrison Hotel). Prestigious Italian dining establishments included the Rush Street restaurants Riccardo's, El Bianco, and Milano's.

== Local economic impact ==
Ahead of the conventions, the Chicago Convention Bureau estimated that at each convention, the average attendee would spend in excess of $150 over five-days. Based upon this, they projected $5 million in convention-related spending. Hotels reservations were anticipated to total $1.2 million; retail spending was anticipated to total $850,000; dining spending was anticipated to total $1.1 million; entertainment spending (at theaters, sports events, and nightclubs) was anticipated to generate $650,000; and alcohol sales were anticipated to general $350,000.

While cities like Chicago had sought to host such conventions due to the boost they were regarded to bring in commerce, a downtown liquor retailer was quoted after the Republican National Convention as complaining that his business had actually decreased during the convention. The retailer remarked, "the Republicans took all the hotel space and the usual visitors to the city couldn't get rooms. The Republicans weren't as good customers as the regular visitors to the city."
