= Chicago-style magic =

Close-up magic of 20th century Chicago

Chicago-style magic is a form of stage magic developed and popularized in Chicago in the early to mid 20th century. This style of magic consists of tableside close-up magic emphasizing sleight of hand tricks and humor, and is typically performed at bars, nightclubs, and restaurants.

== History ==
Chicago-style magic was pioneered at the bar Schulien's, which opened in the Lincoln Park neighborhood in 1881 and began to feature magic tableside in the 1930s. In contrast to popular forms of magic at the time, which emphasized theatricality, exoticism, and spectacle (such as that performed by Chicagoan Harry Blackstone Sr.), Chicago-style magic was performed tableside, and incorporated casual banter and humor. This style of magic experienced a boom in the period following World War II, during which Chicago-style magic could be commonly found at bars and restaurants. Tricks often involved small props like cards, coins, and cups. Notable venues that once featured magic included the Empire Room of the Palmer House, The Pump Room, and the New York Lounge.

Chicago-style music began to decline in the 1980s when other forms of late night entertainment such as stand-up comedy began to flourish in the city and the most iconic bars featuring Chicago-style magic closed down or went into new ownership. The practice of hiring magicians in restaurants and bars is no longer commonplace, but some venues such as The Magic Lounge continue to specialize in Chicago-style magic.
