= Ernie Byfield =

American businessman (1889–1950)

Ernest Lessing Byfield (November 3, 1889 – 10 February 1950) was an American hotelier and restaurateur from the 1930s through the 1950s in Chicago, Illinois. Byfield operated the Hotel Sherman Co., including the Ambassador East and West, the Sherman House Hotel, the Fort Dearborn and the Drake hotels and The Pump Room and College Inn restaurants.

== Biography ==
Byfield was born to a Jewish family in Chicago on November 3, 1889. His father, Joseph, the son of innkeepers in Hungary, immigrated to Chicago in 1867 as a teen and changed the family name from Beifeld to Byfield. His father worked for Marshall Field & Company and then went into business with his brother.

Byfield is most famous as the creator and owner of The Pump Room, a restaurant and bar at his Ambassador East hotel that was frequented by the luminaries of the stage and screen from the 1930s to the present. The Pump Room was the preferred stopping-off point for celebrities changing trains in Chicago while travelling between New York City and Los Angeles. Stage and screen stars of the 1930s, 1940s, and 1950s would be invited to join Byfield in Booth 1 at the restaurant and would often boast to their friends that they had "lunched with Ernie" while they were in Chicago. The Pump Room has been described as the most famous restaurant in Chicago and was known for bringing theatrics to the restaurant business. The number of flambé dishes served by his restaurant, The Pump Room, was noted and started a trend in the post-war United States.

A hotelman must be a master of opposites. He needs to be a greeter and a bouncer, pious but ribald, an interior decorator and bartender; he must understand the arrangement of flowers and the disposal of garbage; he may be forced into the acquaintanceship with accouchment and embalming; he should appreciate swing music but encourage quiet, be noted as a connoisseur and competent as a plumber; he must walk with beauty, but only walk with it… Only a man of very loose moral character should accept the job.

— Ernie Byfield

...we serve almost everything flambe in these rooms, occasionally even a waiter's thumb. The people seem to like it and it doesn't harm the food much.

— Ernie Byfield, 1950

== Personal life and death ==
Byfield was married three times. His first wife was Gladys Rosenthal who was also Jewish; she was the daughter of Benjamin J. Rosenthal, the founder of the Chicago Mail Order Company (later known as Aldens). They had two sons: Hugh and Ernest, Jr before divorcing in 1928. His second wife was Kathryn "Kitty" Priest Rand, a gentile; they had one child, Jean, and soon after divorced (she would later marry film producer-director Mervyn LeRoy). His third wife was beauty salon owner Adele Sharpe Thomas, a gentile who was thirty years younger; they remained married until his death. He died on February 10, 1950. Humphrey Bogart and Lauren Bacall attended the funeral and Chicago mayor Martin Kennelly did too.
