= Ambassador East =

Hotel in Chicago

Ambassador Gold Coast
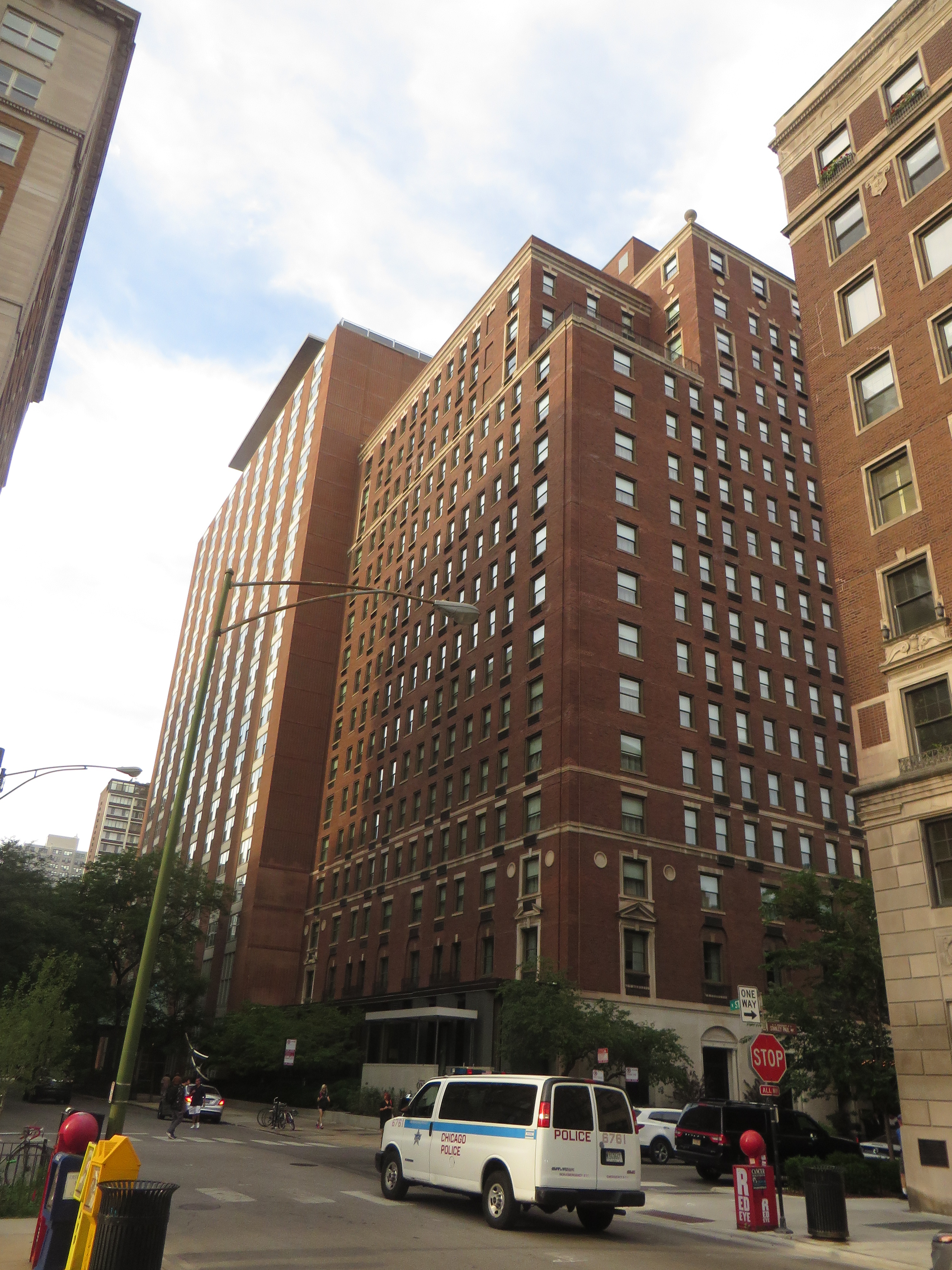
- Hotel chain: The Chicago Collection (current); JdV by Hyatt; Dunfey Hotels/Omni (former)

General information
- Location: 1301 North State Parkway, Chicago, Illinois, United States
- Opened: 1926

Technical details
- Floor count: 17

Other information
- Number of rooms: 285
- Number of restaurants: 1

Website
- Webpage

The Ambassador Gold Coast, known for many decades as the Ambassador East, is a historic hotel in Chicago, established in 1926. In its heyday, the hotel and its iconic restaurant, The Pump Room, were frequented by celebrities. It had a sister hotel located across the street, the Ambassador West, until that hotel closed in 2002.

== Location ==
The hotel is located at 1301 North State Parkway in the Gold Coast area of Chicago. It is located near the city's Magnificent Mile district. It is near Lake Michigan, which it has some views of.

== History ==
The Ambassador East opened in 1926. It had been constructed by hoteliers Frank Bering and Ernie Byfield on the former site of the Huck Brewing Company. The building has seventeen floors.

The hotel received many celebrities in its heyday, including some who were extended residents at the hotel. Among those who held long-term residence at the hotel were Doris Day, Helen Hayes, Eunice Kennedy, Lana Turner and Harry Caray.

Initially, during Byfield's ownership and operation of the hotel, it did not allow dogs, which has been attributed to a personal dislike Byfield had for them. However, reportedly after an interaction with a small poodle had enchanted Byfield, he revoked this policy and began offering special treatment to the dogs of guests. For many decades, the hotel would be well known for the service it offered catering to the dogs of its guests, with a 1991 Chicago Tribune article reporting that that reputation persisted. For the presidential nominating conventions held in Chicago in 1952, the hotel set up a "Pup Room" adjacent to the Pump Room restaurant, to care for dogs brought to Chicago by delegates.

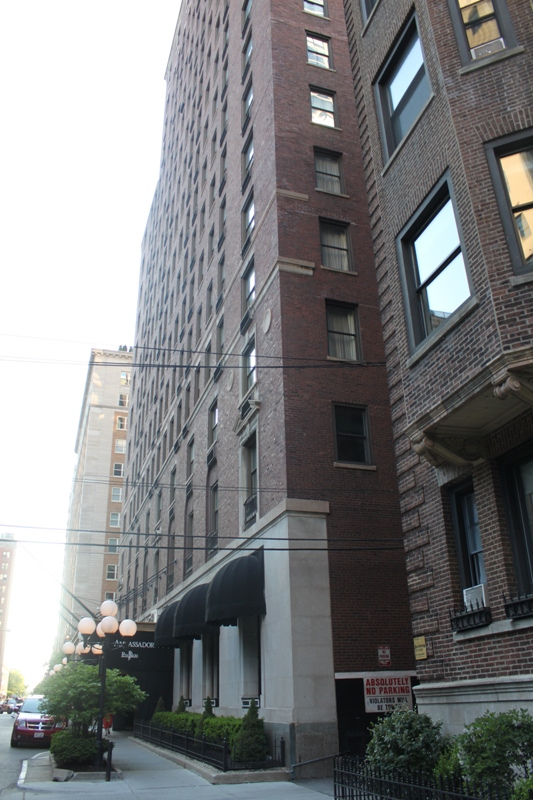
exterior view of the hotel, photographed in 2010

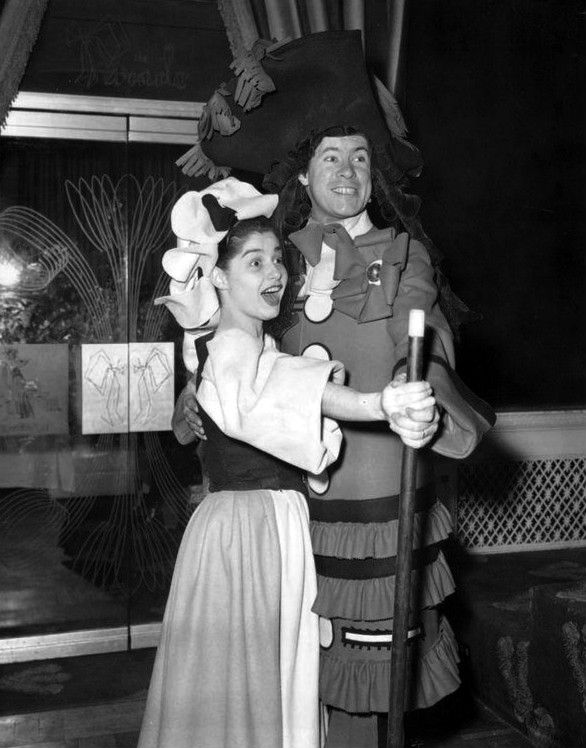
Carol Lawrence (left) performing at the hotel in 1953

The hotel was featured in the film North by Northwest. During the on-site filming of the movie, those working on the film occupied forty of the hotel's rooms, with director Alfred Hitchcock staying in its Mediterranean Suite, and took advantage of the hotel's famed dog-friendliness by having his daughter's pet dog stay at the hotel with him and his family. Indicative of the hotel's popularity at the time with celebrities, the hotel had to decline a request by the film's star, Cary Grant, to stay in the penthouse suite (which he had stayed in weeks earlier when in Chicago to promote his film Indiscreet) because it was being used by Judy Garland (who was in town for concert performances).

Dunfey Hotels acquired the hotel in 1978 and it was renamed the Ambassador East - A Dunfey Classic Hotel. In 1983, Dunfey Hotels became Omni Hotels, and the hotel became the Omni Ambassador East. Omni renovated the hotel in 1999, at a cost of $20 million. Omni sold the hotel in December 2005 to a joint venture of the Fordham Company, The Harp Group, and Mid-America Development Partners, for $47 million and the hotel returned to its original name. The new owners announced plans to convert the hotel to condominiums, but this never materialized.

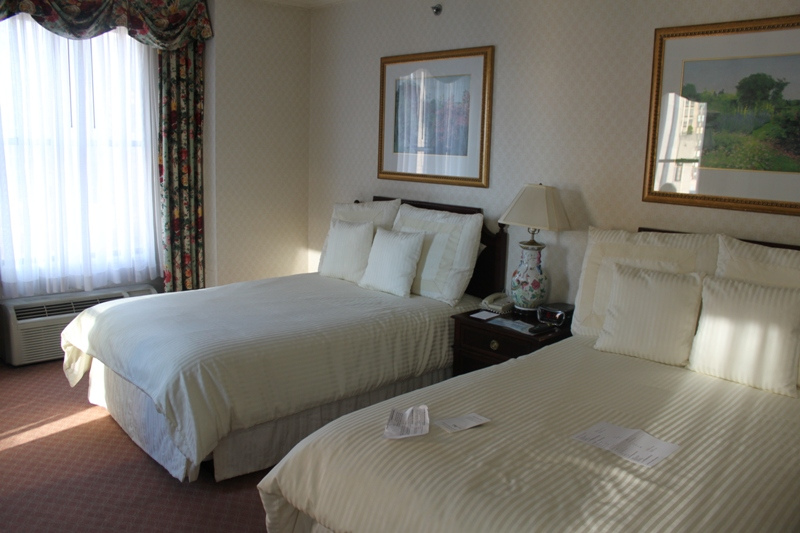
Guest room in early 2010, prior to Schrager's acquisition and renovation of the property

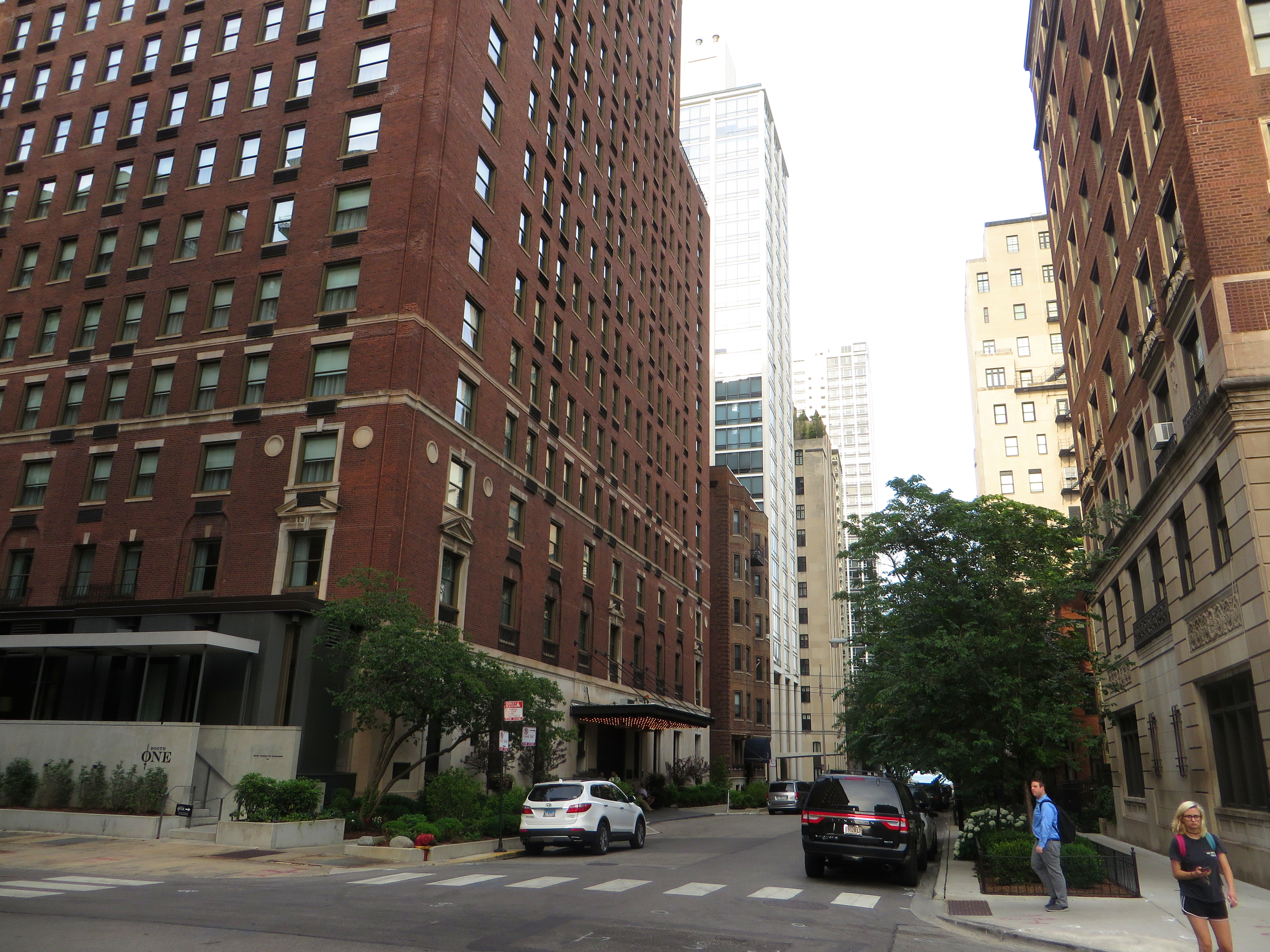
Ambassador East (left), photographed in 2018

In April 2010, Ian Schrager purchased the 285-room hotel for $25 million. This sale came during a down market. Schrager renovated the hotel, and reopened it as the PUBLIC Chicago in 2011. Schrager intended for the hotel to be the first in a chain of PUBLIC hotels. The hotel was sold in 2017 to Shapack Partners and Gaw Capital for $61.5 million, which was considered an underwhelming sale price for the booming hotel market Chicago was experiencing at the time. They hired Journal Hotels to run the hotel as their first Chicago property. The hotel was renamed Ambassador Chicago. In March 2020, it was announced that the hotel would join Hyatt's "Joie de Vivre Hotels" brand, and that a renovation was planned, with upgrades to the hotel’s 285 rooms and suites, as well as to public spaces, such as its "The Library" lounge. However, after this announcement, the hotel was impacted by the COVID-19 pandemic and ultimately was closed for nearly a year.

In October 2022, it was reported that Gaw Capital had hired the hotel real estate brokers RobertDouglas to sell the property. RobertDouglas has marketed the property to buyers as having potential either as a continued hotel operation or as an opportunity for redevelopment for another purpose. It is seen as possible that the hotel might be converted into a residential property, such as apartments or senior housing. In July 2023, a $39 million foreclosure lawsuit on the hotel was brought against Gaw Capital by a lender. In early 2025, the hotel was acquired by new investors for $38.5 million. The new investors disaffiliated the hotel from Hyatt, and added it instead to the Chicago Collection, a group of independent boutique hotels in the city. It was renamed the Ambassador Gold Coast.

== Pump Room ==
From 1938 through 2017, the hotel was home to The Pump Room, a famed restaurant which was once heavily-frequented by celebrities. The Pump Room was the brainchild of Ernie Byfield. The interior was originally designed by the Samuel Abraham Marx. The restaurant's heyday was in the 1950s and 1960s.

After the 2017 closure of The Pump Room, Lettuce Entertain You Enterprises opened a new restaurant in the space named "Booth One". This restaurant closed in 2019, with the exit of Lettuce Entertain You Enterprises. The hotel's restaurant space reopened as "The Food Gallery", and later reopened again as "The Ambassador Room".

== Ambassador West (former sister hotel) ==
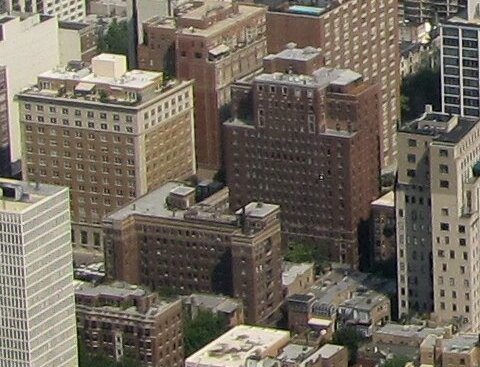
Ambassador West on left, Ambassador East at center

The Ambassador East had a sister hotel located across the street.

Built from 1919-1920, the Hotel Ambassador Chicago was constructed by the owners of the nearby Hotel Sherman and designed by architects Schmidt, Garden & Martin. After the Ambassador East opened in 1926, the original hotel was renamed the Ambassador West.

The hotel had its own trademark restaurant, The Buttery, opened in 1938.

In 1958, the Ambassador West built a new $1 million ballroom named the "Guildhall" on vacant neighboring land it had acquired. The interior was designed by Samuel Abraham Marx. A pair of two extravagant parties were held to christen the new event space. The first party was attended by celebrities such as Douglas Fairbanks Jr., and featured entertainment from Carol Channing.

During their 1959 visit to Chicago, Elizabeth II and Prince Philip, Duke of Edinburgh dined at the hotel at a luncheon hosted by Governor William Stratton. This was Elizabeth II's only visit to the city of Chicago.

In the early 1990s, the Ambassador West was operated by Radisson Hotels as the Radisson Plaza Ambassador West, before going into receivership in 1993. In 1997, it was sold to Grand Heritage Hotels. Soon after, Patriot American Hospitality purchased that chain and Wyndham Hotels and renamed the hotel Ambassador West - a Wyndham Grand Heritage Hotel. In 2002, the Ambassador West closed and was converted into The Ambassador condominiums.
