= Fort Dearborn Hotel =

Skyscraper in Chicago, Illinois

- U.S. National Register of Historic Places
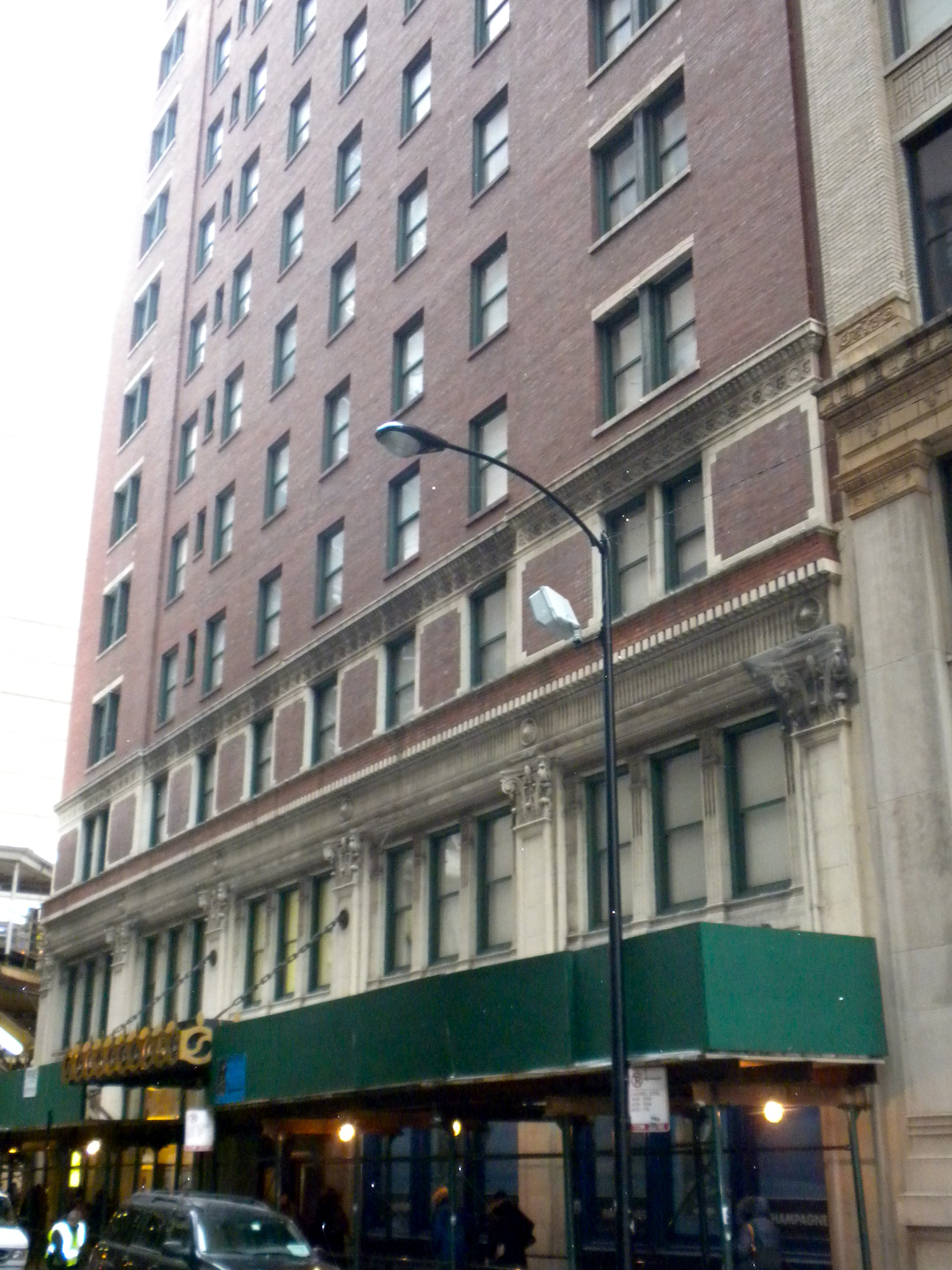

- Location within Chicago metropolitan area Location within Illinois Location within the United States
- Location: 401 S. LaSalle St., Chicago, Illinois
- Coordinates: 41°52′36″N 87°37′52″W
- Area: 0.2 acres (0.081 ha)
- Built: 1914
- Architect: Holabird & Roche
- Architectural style: Venetian Renaissance
- NRHP reference No.: 82000390
- Added to NRHP: November 12, 1982

The Fort Dearborn Hotel is a skyscraper and former hotel located at 401 S. Lasalle St. in the Loop community area of Chicago, Illinois. The 17-story hotel was designed by Holabird & Roche and finished in 1914. Designed in the Venetian Renaissance style, the hotel was built with gray and reddish brown brick and featured terra cotta ornamentation. The lobby features two murals by local artist Edgar Cameron depicting scenes of Fort Dearborn. The hotel was built to serve businessmen during a period of extensive hotel construction in Chicago; its site was chosen for its access to transportation, as it was located near LaSalle Street Station and the LaSalle/Van Buren 'L' station. The Hotel Sherman Co. owned both the Fort Dearborn Hotel and the nearby Hotel Sherman, and the two hotels had a common management and kitchen staff. However, while the Hotel Sherman was a typical luxury hotel of the era, the Fort Dearborn Hotel focused on providing practical amenities at lower rates and set an example as a "popular, commercial hotel". The hotel is now an office building known as the LaSalle Atrium Building.

The Fort Dearborn Hotel was added to the National Register of Historic Places on November 12, 1982.
