= The Pump Room =

Closed Chicago restaurant

- Interactive map of The Pump Room

Restaurant information
- Established: October 1, 1938
- Previous owners: Lettuce Entertain You Enterprises (1976-1998); Ernie Byfield
- Location: 1301 N State Pkwy, Chicago, Illinois, 60610, United States
- Coordinates: 41.9059°N 87.6285°W

The Pump Room was a restaurant established on October 1, 1938 by Ernie Byfield. It closed in 2017, then reopened under different names. It was located inside of the Ambassador East hotel, located on the northeast corner of State Parkway and Goethe Street in Chicago's Gold Coast area.

== History ==
The restaurant opened on October 1, 1938. It was the brainchild of hotelier Ernie Byfield and its interior was originally designed by Samuel Abraham Marx.

The restaurant's heyday was in the 1950s and 1960s. A number of celebrities were regular customers. Lucius Beebe, gourmand, author and journalist, included references to The Pump Room in some of his books and articles. Arturo Petterino (1920–2010) was its maitre d' for many years, steering celebrity patrons to the coveted Booth One.

The restaurant was owned by Lettuce Entertain You Enterprises from 1976 through 1998.

In April 2010, the Ambassador East Hotel was sold to Ian Schrager Co. The hotel and restaurant closed in 2011 for remodeling. The hotel was reopened as the Public Chicago. The Pump Room reopened on October 11, 2011, with food concepts by Jean-Georges Vongerichten.

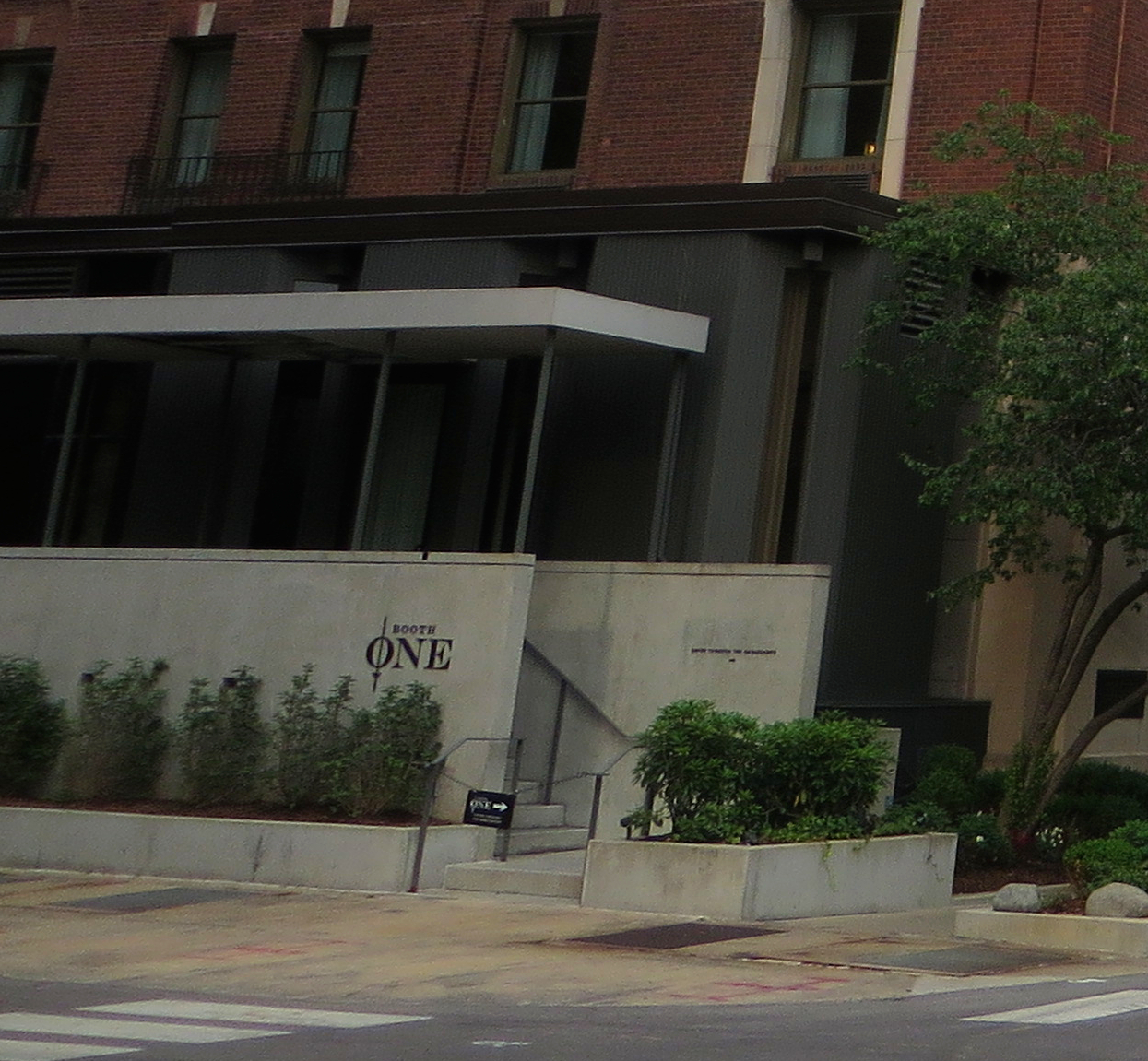
Entrance to the restaurant space photographed in 2018, when the venue was named "Booth One"

The hotel was sold again in July 2017 to Journal Hotels. They renamed the hotel the Ambassador Chicago and closed The Pump Room. A reconfigured restaurant, named Booth One, opened November 16, 2017, again run by Lettuce Entertain You Enterprises. On May 30, 2019, it was announced that the hotel and Lettuce Entertain You had severed their agreement and Booth One would close on June 29, 2019.

The hotel's restaurant was reopened as the Food Gallery and later as The Ambassador Room.

== In popular culture ==
The lobby of the hotel, including the entrance to The Pump Room, is seen in Alfred Hitchcock's 1959 North by Northwest.

Special lyrics were written for Judy Garland's 1961 version of the 1922 Fred Fischer song, "Chicago (That Toddlin' Town)": "We'll meet at The Pump Room/Ambassador East/To say the least/on shish kebab/and breast of squab we will feast/And get fleeced".

One variation of the song "My Kind of Town (Chicago Is)", popularized by Frank Sinatra in 1964, has the line "Chicago is... the jumpin' Pump Room".

In the spoken word introduction to the Monkees song "Don't Call on Me" (from their 1967 album Pisces, Aquarius, Capricorn & Jones Ltd.), Micky Dolenz makes reference to "the elegant Pump Room...high over Chicago" against a background of drunken patter, clinking glasses and lounge piano. Dolenz, however, mistakenly places it in the Palmer House; moreover, the few steps from the street to the hotel lobby, and from the lobby to The Pump Room, make it hardly "high over" the city.

In the 1974 movie The Front Page Hildy Johnson (Jack Lemmon) angrily tells his boss (Walter Matthau) that he "wouldn't cover the Last Supper for you if they held it in The Pump Room of the Ambassador East."

In a 1979 episode of Match Game, Charles Nelson Riley said that cabbage and bacon he ate at the Pump Room was still repeating on him a week later.

The Ambassador East was a primary location for the 1980 film My Bodyguard, starring Chris Makepeace, Matt Dillon, Ruth Gordon and Martin Mull. In the film, Mull plays the hotel manager who lives on-site with his son (Makepeace) and mother (Gordon). The family eats breakfast at The Pump Room.

Near the end of the title sequence of 1983's Doctor Detroit, Fran Drescher's character, prostitute Karen Blittstein, arrives for an outcall at the Ambassador East, the limousine pulling up in front of The Pump Room's false windows.

An incident at the restaurant inspired Phil Collins to name his multi-platinum 1985 album No Jacket Required.

Also in 1985, the T. J. Hooker episode "The Chicago Connection" depicted Sergeant Hooker (William Shatner) staying undercover at the Ambassador East with a Chicago Police Department detective, during which they ordered room service from The Pump Room. The nighttime exterior establishing shot (filmed on a studio back lot) mistakenly depicted westbound traffic on one-way eastbound Goethe Street.

Upon learning of his inheritance in the 1986 film Running Scared, Detective Danny Costanzo (Billy Crystal) tells his partner Ray Hughes (Gregory Hines) that he's going to dine at The Pump Room.

The Millennium Biltmore Hotel's distinctive lobby doubled as The Pump Room in episode four (1988) of War and Remembrance when Rhoda ends her adulterous relationship with Palmer Kirby.

Jazz singer Erin McDougald was the youngest headliner in the history of The Pump Room; she was introduced on live radio, to new general manager Bill Borden in 2002, by WGN talk show host Rick Kogan. Borden offered McDougald a contract on the spot and her two-year residency as the weekend headline entertainment garnered national press; the young McDougald was cited in USA Today (December 2003), the Chicago Sun-Times (April 2004), and various food publications as part of the renewed success and elevated Zagat rating, moving the restaurant from 3 stars to 4. While McDougald was in residency, her performances attracted famous guests in the audience, including poet Maya Angelou, Dennis Farina, Bob Dylan, and John Malkovich.

== See also ==
- List of Michelin Bib Gourmand restaurants in the United States
