= Seaham, New South Wales =

Seaham
- Suburb
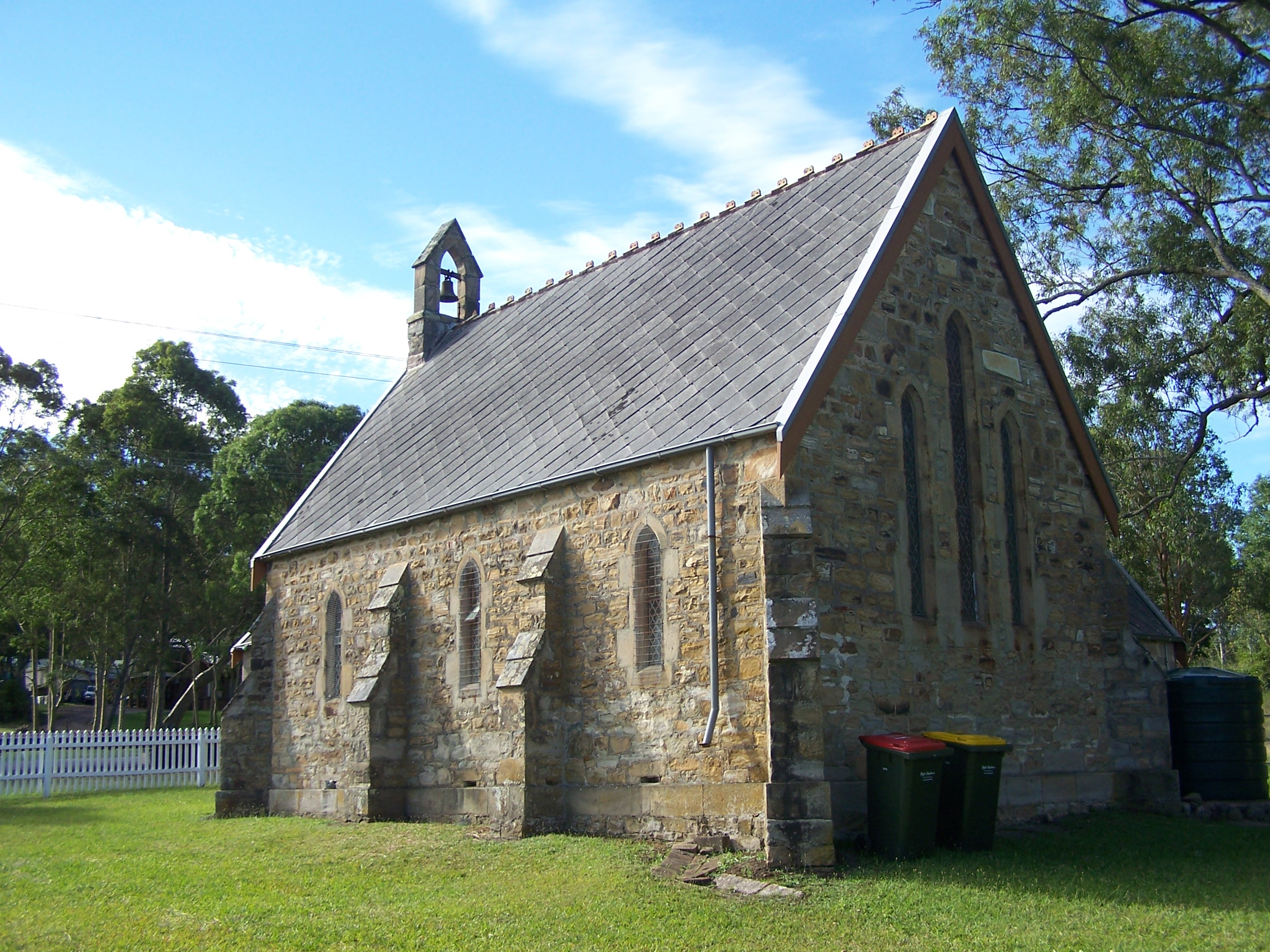
- St. Andrews Anglican Church, dedicated 1860

- Interactive map of Seaham
- Coordinates: 32°39′54″S 151°43′04″E
- Country: Australia
- State: New South Wales
- Region: Hunter
- LGA: Port Stephens Council
- Location: 179 km (111 mi) N of Sydney; 40 km (25 mi) NNW of Newcastle; 14.6 km (9.1 mi) NNW of Raymond Terrace; 22 km (14 mi) NE of Maitland
- Established: 1822

Government
  - State electorate: Port Stephens
  - Federal division: Lyne

Area (Note: Area calculation is based on 1:100000 map 9232 NEWCASTLE.)
  - Total: 42.8 km^{2} (16.5 sq mi)

Population
  - Total: 1,025 (2011 census)
  - Density: 23.9/km^{2} (62/sq mi)
- Time zone: UTC+10 (AEST)
  - Summer (DST): UTC+11 (AEDT)
- Postcode: 2324
- Parish: Seaham
- Mean max temp: 29.6 °C (85.3 °F)
- Mean min temp: 6.1 °C (43.0 °F)
- Annual rainfall: 925.2 mm (36.43 in)
Suburbs around Seaham
Duns Creek	Glen Oak	East Seaham
Butterwick, Woodville, Wallalong	Seaham	East Seaham, Eagleton
Wallalong, Hinton	Brandy Hill, Hinton, Osterley, Nelsons Plains	Raymond Terrace

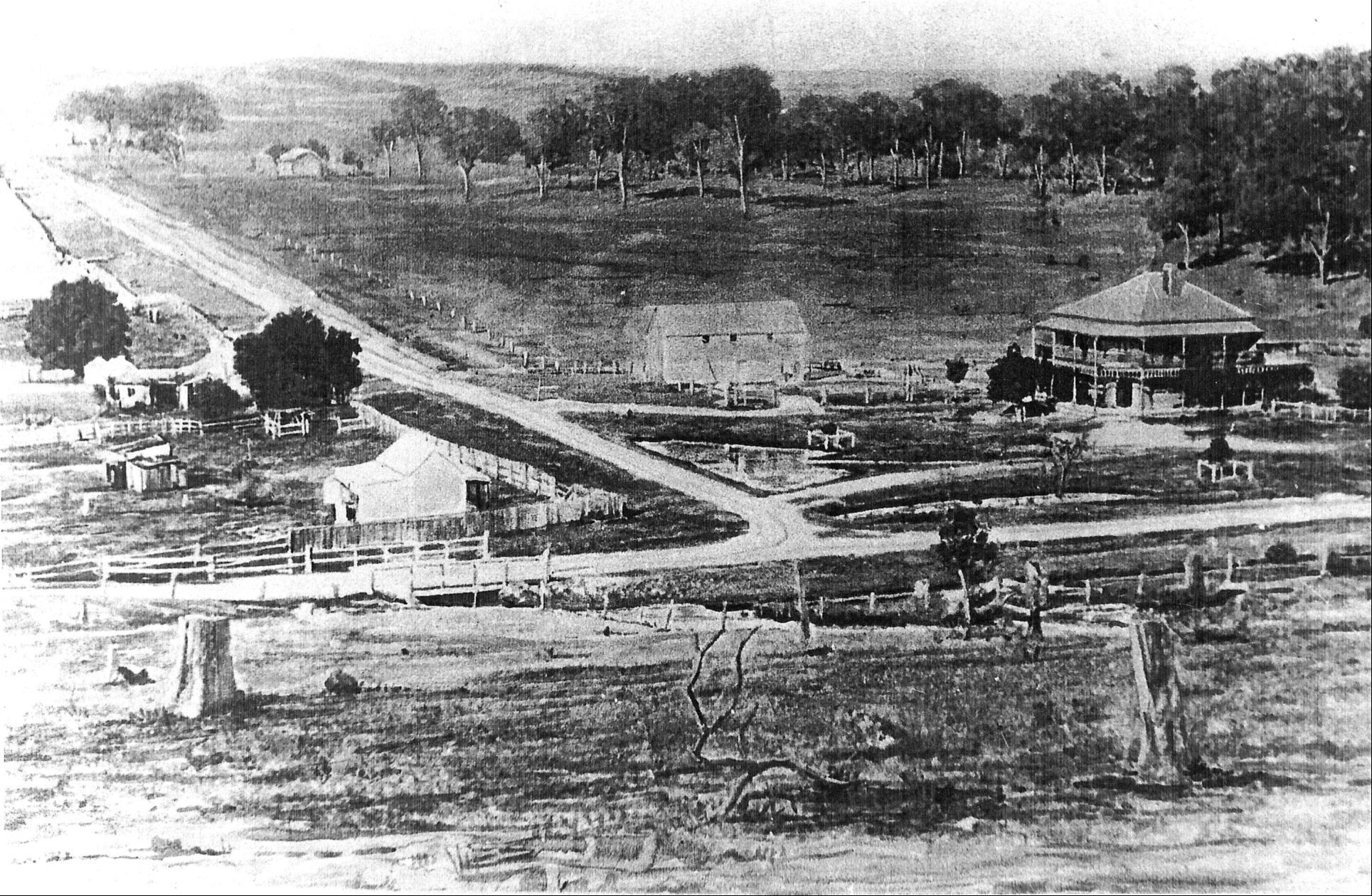
Seaham Hotel, at the intersection of Vine and Dixon Streets, circa 1910

Seaham is a suburb of the Port Stephens local government area in the Hunter Region of New South Wales, Australia. It is located on the Williams River which flows into the Hunter River 14.6 km (9.1 mi) downstream from Seaham village at Raymond Terrace.

It is a rural community supporting a small but expanding population. While the actual village of Seaham, which is located in the north-eastern corner of the suburb, is relatively compact and composed of only a handful of streets, the suburb itself covers an area of approximately 42.8 km^{2} (16.5 sq mi). At the 2011 census, Seaham had a population of 1,025. Greater Seaham covers an even larger area and incorporates East Seaham, Brandy Hill, Eagleton and Eskdale Estate.

== History ==
=== First inhabitants ===
In 1938, Walter John Enright wrote of the district's traditional owners:

"When the first settlers arrived in Seaham, the land was occupied by the Garewagal, a clan or sept of the Worimi. The territory of the Worimi was bounded by the Hawkesbury and Manning Rivers respectively on the south and north, the ocean on the east, and extended as far west as the junction of Glendon Brook and the Hunter River. The language was called Kattang. It was not as complex as that of the people further north on the coast. The name of the sept is derived from 'gal' or 'kal' meaning a division or clan, and 'Garewa,' the sea. The Hunter was the southern boundary, Port Stephens the north, the ocean the east, and they roamed inland as far as Glendon Junction. They were food gatherers, that is to say, they did not cultivate but gathered whatever was found in a state of nature, whether of vegetable or animal life, except such as were poisonous and in the latter class they did not consider snakes... Totemism was one of the most important features of his (sic) life. Each individual had a totem and there was also a totem for the female clan and another for the male clan, and the Karaji had also a totem. No individual would kill or gather what was his totem...For carrying food, bags of excellent quality were made of native twine as was also the scoop net used for fishing. Water was carried in a hollowed piece of wood or bark. Fishing hooks were made of shell."

On the impacts of colonisation in the Seaham district, Enright says:

"Within the space of this article it is only possible to touch, and that lightly, on certain aspects of the native life. The newcomers who dispossessed the native of his hunting grounds without compensating him did not understand his language nor did they know his culture. The native was cowed by the power and culture of the white. He was crushed and humiliated when he saw the grounds that were sacred to him profaned and his people despised."

On the subject of massacres of Aboriginal people and Torres Strait Islander people by settlers following colonisation, Enright writes:

"History does not tell us of any direct violence offered to the whites in the district of Seaham. It is, fortunately, free of records of those brutal and cowardly massacres, not only of men, but women and children, that are such frightful blots on the history of other parts of our State. Notwithstanding that, not a single full-blooded native of the Williams River is now existing."

The Seaham district and environs, however, may not have been entirely without such "frightful blots" on its history. In 1877, a massacre at nearby Wallalong was recounted in correspondence published by the Maitland Mercury and Hunter River General Advertiser:

"[Traditional owners] suffered a good deal of injustice at the hands of some of the first settlers, and there is now living a man who was present, as he admits, when a party had formed for the purpose of punishing the blacks for pulling the cobs of maize in the field, and carrying it off in their nets to their camps. Observing some smoke rising from the midst of the Wallalong bush, they armed themselves with muskets, and reached unobserved the camp, where a considerable number of men, women, and children were. They fired at once upon them, killing some and wounding others. The rest fled through the bush, pursued by the whites, and the whole of the natives took to the water intervening between the brush and the high land, towards which it gradually deepened, and some of the poor creatures were drowned. My informant, now a very old man, while expressing regret as to occurrence, said the worst part of the whole affray was, they afterwards discovered, that not one of those who were "wanted" was among them."

Reflecting on the massacre, the correspondent goes on to remark that:

"The haymakers in the Wallalong fields have little suspected the occurrence of these tragical scenes on the exact spots where they have stood when engaged in their peaceful occupation."

While the exact location of the massacre is not provided, an account of floods in 1857 describes how "the first breach it made was at Wallalong, whence the water gradually found its way over a considerable portion of Bowthorne, Hopewell, Barty's Swamps (sic), and all the low lands in that direction". To the east, Wallalong is separated from the "high land" of Brandy Hill, previously known as Ahalton and Warren's Station Paddock, by Barties Swamp. It is possible that the shootings and drownings described as occurring "between the brush and the high land" took place on or about Barties Swamp, below present-day Brandy Hill.

=== Old Barrack and Government Cottage (c1801–1822) ===
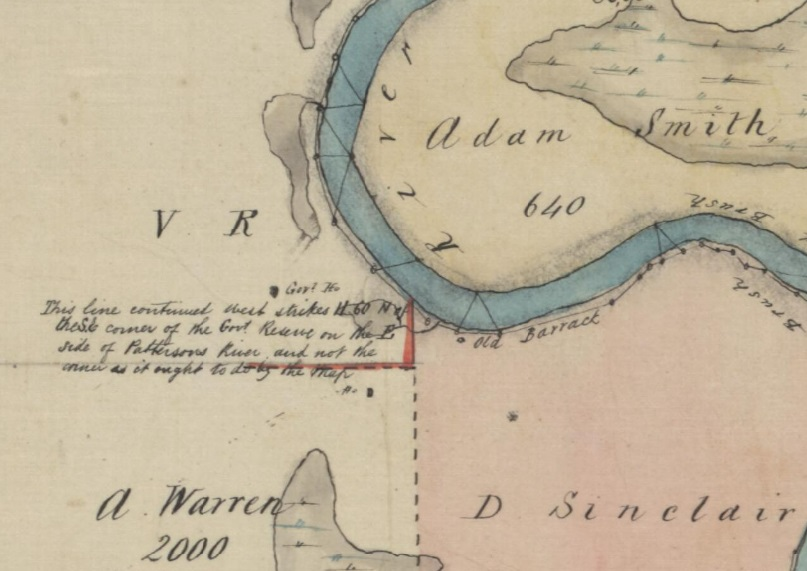
An 1831 map of Seaham by George Boyle White that identifies the site of the original convict guard house by the river.

The first Europeans in the Seaham district were cedar-cutting gangs from the convict settlement at Newcastle. Under military guard, these groups erected a barrack building on the riverbank south of the future village reserve sometime after 1801. This was the first European structure in Seaham and, according to historian Cynthia Hunter, it likely influenced surveyor Henry Dangar to set aside land for a village in that locale.

The writer Alexander Harris (1805-1874) was among those who visited the Seaham district during the era when "cedar-getting was going on at a great rate". He provides this uncanny account of a visit to the locale in his book Settlers and Convicts:

The river, on the banks of which we now were, rises and for a long distance winds to and fro among the mountains of the country of Durham: at length it falls into the Hunter [river], not a great way from the mouth of that stream. It is now well settled; but at the time we were there spoiling it of its cedar, only here and there amidst the lonely wilderness was there to be found a settler's farm or stockman's hut. The blacks were occasionally, but not often, troublesome. The stories they used to tell us about the brush thereabouts being haunted by a great tall animal like a man with his feet turned backwards, of much greater, however, than the human stature, and covered with hair, and perpetually making a frightful noise as he wandered about alone, made me sometimes doubt whether they were themselves really terrified, or were merely endeavouring to scare us away; but I very strongly incline to the latter opinion. Be it as it may, there was no such consequence. We were too well used to that lonely tree-guarded silence, broken only by the clink of the rising saw, and to the damp unsunned ground, with its thick brown covering of thousandfold rotting rustling leaves, to have any very important new sensations to acquire hereabouts.

The first free settlers arrived in Seaham not long after Newcastle transitioned from being a convict settlement to a free society in 1822/23. This had been the recommendation of both Governor Macquarie and John Thomas Bigge, royal commissioner, with the removal of convicts to Port Macquarie opening the Hunter Valley to agriculturists. Around this time, the commandant at Newcastle Major Morisset also had ‘several small cottages … erected for sundry useful purposes at [his] discretion”. One of these government cottages was situated where the town of Seaham was later formed.

The government cottage at Seaham was likely built between 1819 and 1822, the year Henry Dangar began surveying the Hunter Valley for settlement. It was “constructed of studs, brick nogged, and plaistered within and stuccoed on the outside, the rooms floored with boards and the verandahs with tiles”. A detached kitchen had burnt down before the superintendent of public works at Newcastle, William Buchanan, visited in April 1830. The cottage was situated “about 1/4 mile from the riverbank” within what would become Section 3 of the Town of Seaham. It is visible on an 1831 map of the district prepared by George Boyle White, adjacent to Alexander Warren’s house (later known as “Brandon”) and the c1801 convict-built barrack building.

It seems the government cottage was seldom used for public purposes. Built for the convenience of Morisset or any “respectable settlers passing up or down the river”, the cottage quickly fell into a state of decay. It was sold in June 1830 for £45 to Edward Carlton Atkinson. By this time the cottage was situated on land reserved for a future township (Seaham), limiting Atkinson’s ability to acquire additional land to form a farm. Town lots surrounding Atkinson would not be offered for sale until 1838.

The fate of the government cottage is unknown. The site of the much earlier barrack building, built by convicts sometime between 1801 and 1822, was identifiable as late as 1939. In that year it was marked as “ruins” on a map prepared by the Australian Section of the War Office using aerial photographs taken by the Royal Australian Air Force. This map is held at the Newcastle City Library.

=== Colonisation and Land Grants (1822–1838) ===
From 1791 to 1831, the Governors of New South Wales issued free grants of land on behalf of the Crown to individuals to encourage and advance the settlement of the Colony. In Seaham, the first of these land grants were made after Dangar’s 1822 survey. Some of the prominent settlers from this time included Alexander Warren at “Brandon”, Henry Carmichael at “Porphyry”, Walter Scott at “Eskdale”, and James McClymont at “Ahalton Farm” (now Brandy Hill). On the east bank of the river, near the village reserve, there was also George Mosman, a nephew of Archibald Mosman, at "Burrowel".

In 1825, the Seaham and Paterson districts were terrorised by bushrangers known as "Jacob's Mob". The first organised gang of its kind in the Lower Hunter, the bandits called on James McClymont and his young family at "Ahalton Farm" (now partly within Brandy Hill) in July 1825. The McClymonts were so fearful after this encounter that left the Seaham district two months later and returned to Sydney. As a result of this reign of terror, horse patrols were soon established in the district to deal with the bushranger threat.

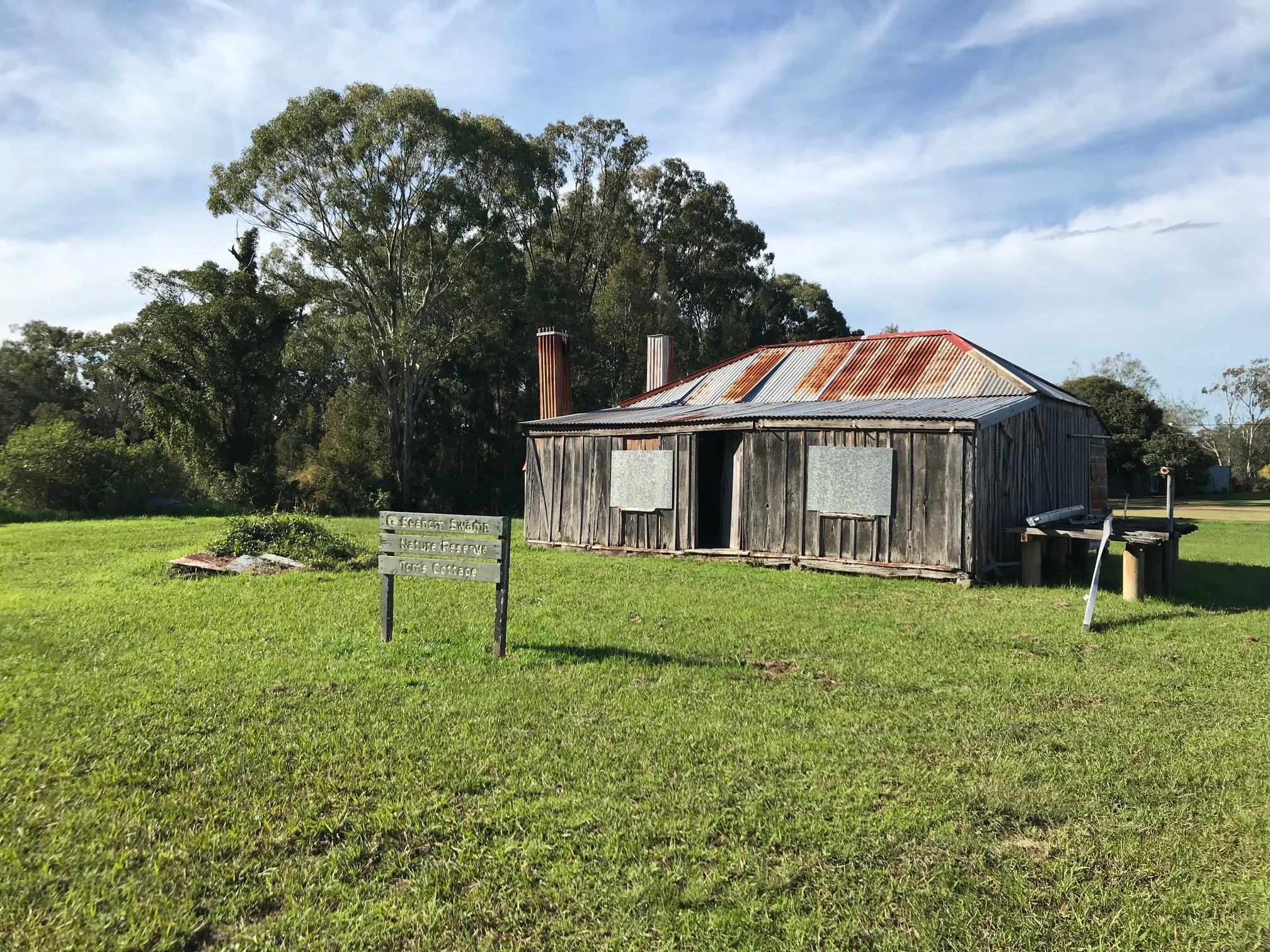
Tom's Cottage at Seaham, a fine example of a typical colonial era rural dwelling. This cottage occupies the original site of Seaham Public School (c1852-1859).

As noted by historian Cecily Joan Mitchell, there are not many of the original houses of importance left at Seaham. One exception is "Eskdale", associated with Walter Scott, the nephew of Surgeone Walter Scott who lived nearby at Wallalong. The house is a contemporary of the earliest homesteads in the district and is a single-storey dwelling, built of stone cut from the ground nearby. Mitchell writes that "the cedar joinery is particularly elegant, panels with fine moulding beneath every window" and that the house plan "is the usual symmetrical Georgian type: a very wide hall leads from the flagged front verandah to the back verandah; two large rooms in front and four at the back. Twin chimneys at either end are of stone". The house was later occupied by the Lex McDonald and his family.

The impacts of colonisation on the traditional Worimi people of Seaham is evidenced by the colonial 'blanket lists' of this period. In 1814, eight years before the first free settlers arrived in Seaham, Governor Macquarie had initiated the official distribution of blankets to Aboriginal people. Macquarie hoped the adoption of blankets would encourage 'civilised' habits and cooperation with settlers. In time blankets were usually distributed by magistrates or police annually on 1 May, the Queen's Birthday. From at least 1835, one of these distribution points was on Alexander Warren's "Brandon" estate, south of the Seaham village reserve. Surviving records show a diminishing number of blankets despatched between that year (40 blankets) and 1841 (25 blankets). By 1850, distribution of blankets within the wider Hunter region was almost non-existent.

=== Town of Seaham and Winemaking (1838–1915) ===
On 26 July 1838 the Government Gazette announced that a site had been fixed upon for a government town at Seaham. The minimum price was £2 sterling per acre. However, despite the colonial government's best efforts, the Town of Seaham did not flourish. An early attempt to build a court house and lock up came to nought. Neighbouring Raymond Terrace and Dungog were preferred for more substantial public buildings. Although Seaham, like other government towns, had been surveyed with streets running north-south and east-west, the early focus of the village became a bend on the Williams River designated Crescent Street. This was a low-lying precinct adjacent to the swamp, prone to regular flooding and characterised by smaller, more irregular shaped town lots. Nevertheless, it was a convenient site for a public pound, and it was around this essential service that a semblance of village life eventually clustered.

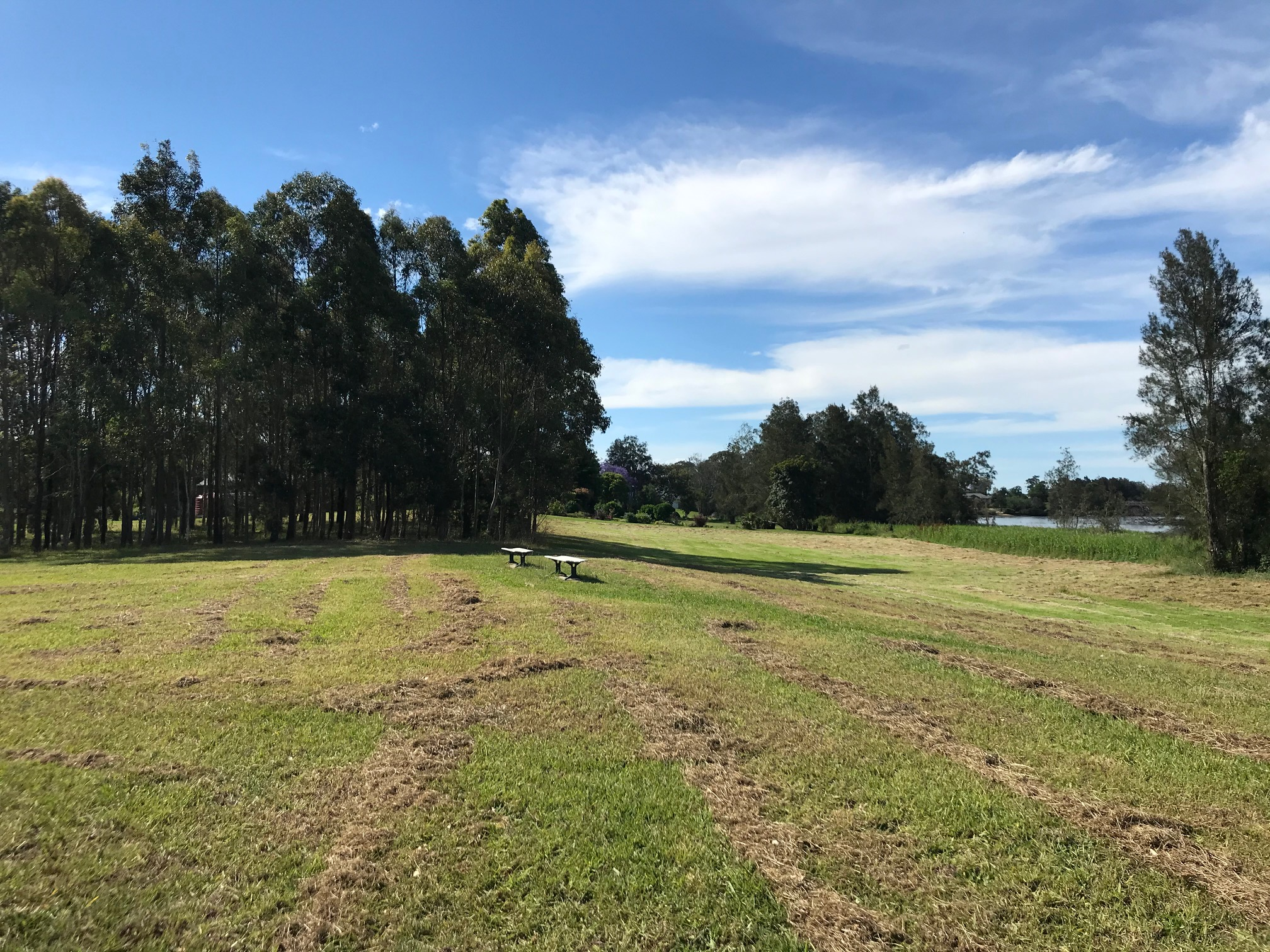
The site of the c1840 Seaham Pound and later c1850 Seaham Hotel.

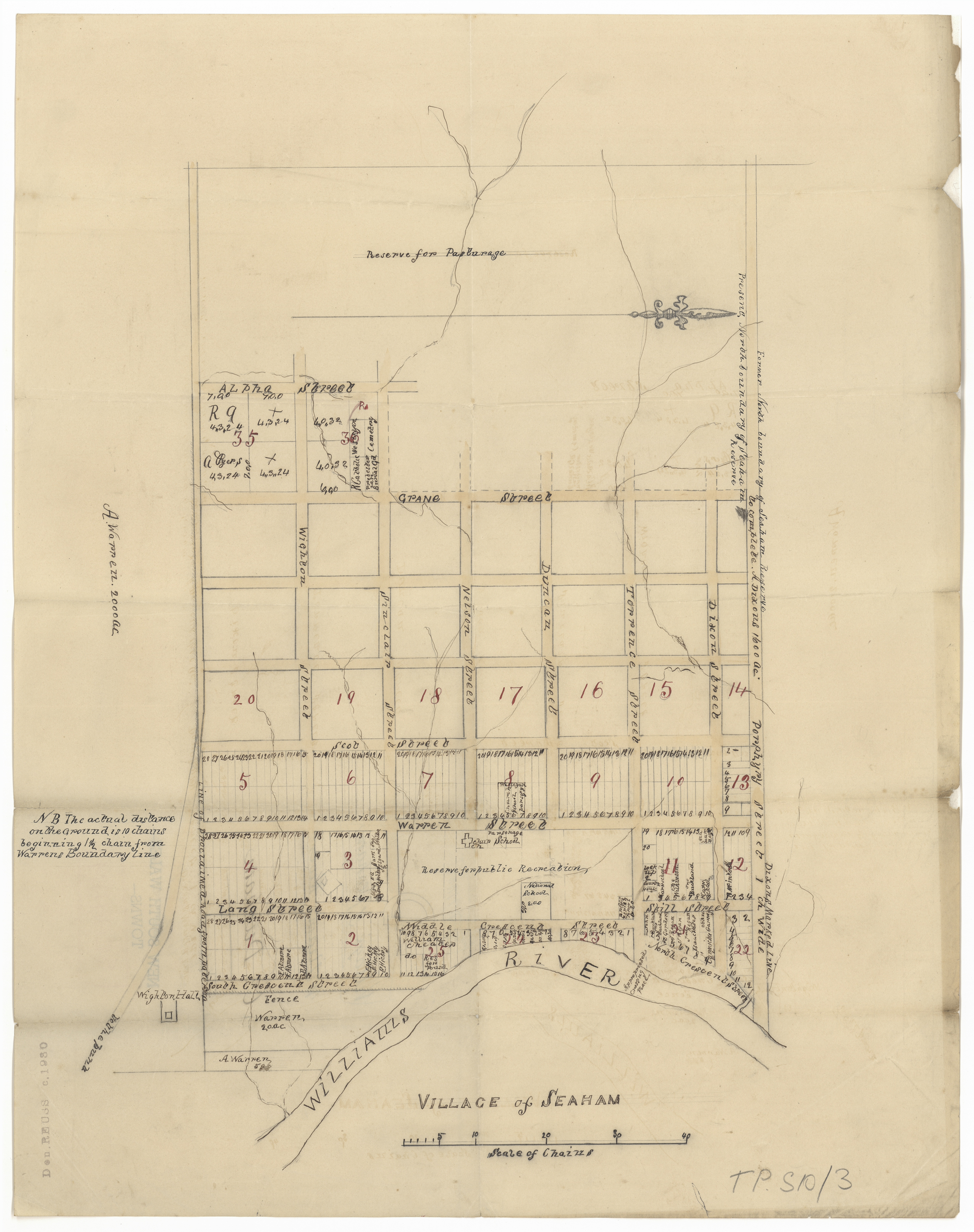
A rare map of the Village of Seaham c1850-60 that identifies the sites of early buildings such as the government cottage, pound/hotel, and first schoolhouse.

John Saward was the village's the first poundkeeper. He had arrived in the colony as a convict in February 1832 and received his ticket of leave in 1838. By the time of his marriage to Elinor Keefe the following year, Saward was living on the Williams River. From as early as 1842 until 1848 he kept the public pound and operated a ferry service across the river to "Burrowel". Described as "very industrious, much esteemed, and respected by all who knew him", Saward "left a wife and four children to deplore their loss" when he fell from a spring cart and died on the road between Seaham and Hinton in November 1848. An inquest found that he "did not appear to have died instantly" after a cartwheel crossed his neck, "his right hand having swept the dust about in a semicircle as if he had vainly tried to release himself".

The loss of a much liked poundkeeper was not the only tragedy to stalk the young village. In June 1844, "a most diabolical murder" had taken place "near Mr Warren's fence" about a mile from Saward's pound, commemorated in later years with the name "Deadman's Creek". The victim, Robert Campbell of Clarence Town, was found "lying on the road with [his] throat cut so dreafdully that the head was nearly severed from the body". Benjamin Stanley was eventually convicted of 'wilful murder' and sentenced to death. On 7 November of that year he was hung at Newcastle, ending his confession by saying: "Drink and bad company have brought me to this end". The murder had occurred only two months after a three year old child, Patrick Lawler, had fallen down a well and drowned in Seaham. Amidst all this, an economic depression had precipitated the first wave of bank failures seen in Australia. It seems fitting that the small burial ground at Seaham was first pressed into service about this time. James Warby, a 10 month old baby, is thought to be one of the first interments. He was buried at Seaham in either September or October 1847. By decade's end, however, the people of Seaham were anything but dispirited. At a public meeting of "between twenty and thirty heads of families" on 23 March 1849 it was unanimously resolved that "steps should be taken with the view of getting a national school established in the township".

The first national school was eventually built at Seaham sometime after 1852. The rush to the goldfields had robbed the district of "almost every available worker" and it is reported that Christopher West had made a cottage available for a schoolroom and teacher’s residence in the first years of its operation. The first purpose-built schoolhouse was, however, not without its problems and by 1859 it was described as unsafe. A third schoolhouse (counting West's cottage as first) was appropriated from a nearby general store kept by Alexander Cameron and this structure was used from the mid-1860s until a more substantial brick schoolhouse and teacher’s residence was erected on higher ground in 1885. Both buildings were later destroyed in a 1939 bushfire.

By 1852, the year the Board of National Education appointed its first teacher to Seaham, John Saward's old home at the Seaham Pound had been “admirably adapted for the business of an Inn, or General Store” and was at the time “known as the post office, punt, and poundkeepers’ establishment”. These modifications were made by William Cheater, who had been appointed poundkeeper in 1850. Seaham’s first public house operated intermittently on this site from at least 1853 until 1868. Christopher West was the first licensee and from 1856 until about 1860 it was known as the Seaham Hotel. Under Frederick Wadkins and later James Leake, the premises were known as the Williams River Inn between 1860 and 1865. It was built of weatherboard and contained eight rooms with a lucerne paddock and six stall stable.

Despite its progress, early impressions of Seaham were seldom favourable. In 1862 a “disappointed free selector” described coming upon Seaham “looking for a nice little village but found it to be quite an abortion”. Two years earlier, a different visitor described Seaham as “… yclept by courtesy a town, and boasting the possession of a public house, a National School, and a store, this trinity of building comprising the aforesaid town.”

However, while the township may have faltered in early years, life and industry on the larger estates was a different story altogether. By the mid-nineteenth century, Seaham was an established district of early wine production. In 1838, Henry Carmichael had planted the first vines at “Porphyry” from cuttings taken from the Sydney Botanical Gardens. In 1850, samples of Porphyry wine were presented to his Royal Highness, Prince Albert, and it was reported that “at the palace it was considered excellent”. The vineyard’s reputation was further cemented with silver medals awarded at exhibitions in Sydney (1862), Paris (1878), and Melbourne (1888). Porphyry took out the champion prize of a Gold Medal at the Royal Show in Sydney in 1904.

The following is a description of the winemaking process at "Porphyry", made by a visiting journalist in 1866:

At the time of winemaking the grapes are cut by women and children into buckets and tumbled into a cask, which is placed on a slide and drawn up the rows by a horse. Each cask, when full, is taken up to the wine house and there emptied into a crusher. This is a semi-circular swivel machine made of wood with a beater, which is worked backwards and forwards by two men. The semi-circular motion crushes and separates the berries from the stalks and allows the juice, pulp and skins to pass through wooden bars at the bottom of the machine into a receiving tub underneath… The wine houses, of which there are two, are slab buildings 50 feet long and 18 feet wide and capable of holding 4500 gallons each. They are used for storing wine, there not being sufficient cellarage yet in place. Besides these buildings there is a cellar underground, with holds about 3000 gallons. This is beneath Porphyry House.

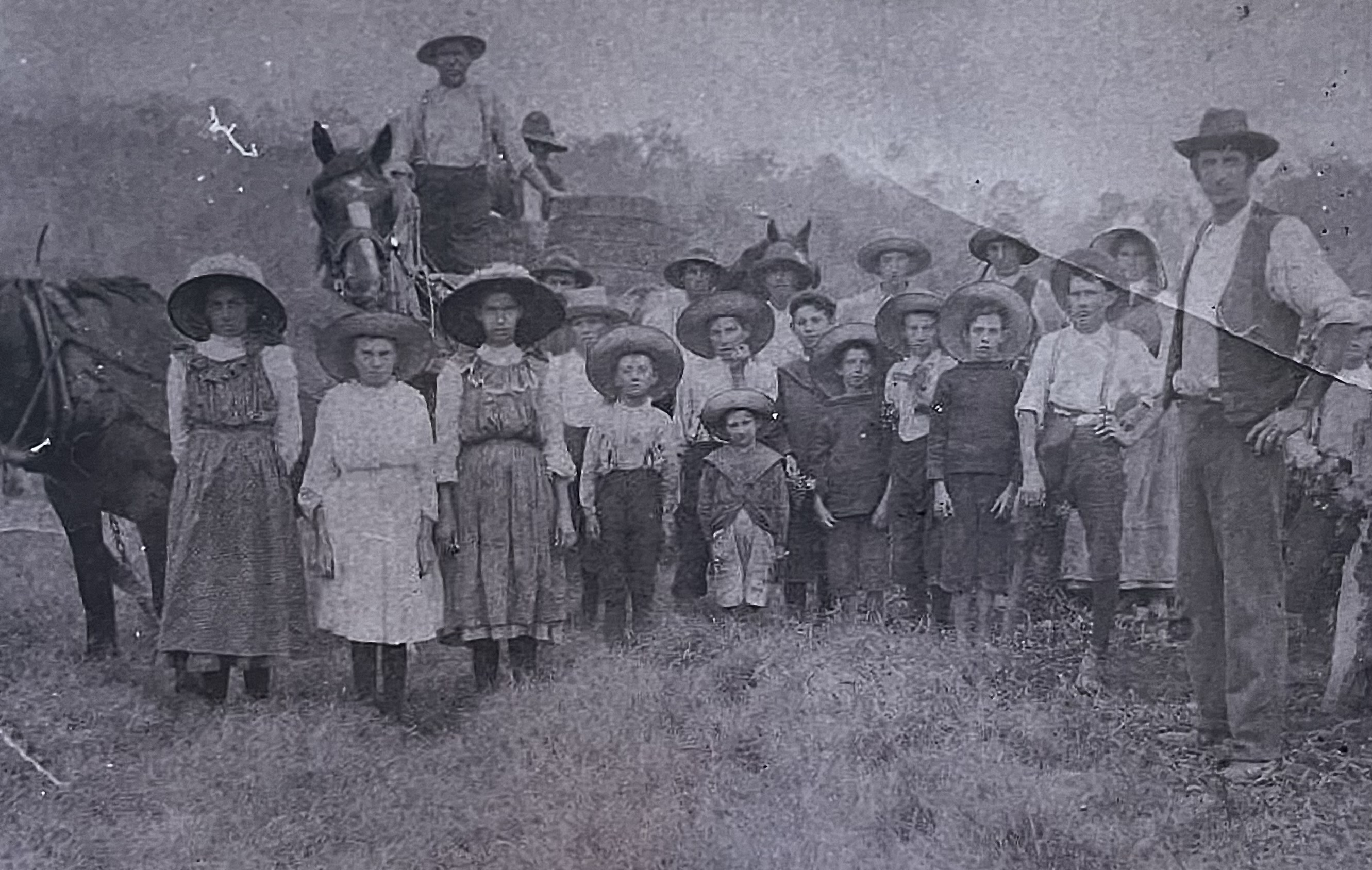
A grape harvest at the renowned Porphyry vineyard c1900.

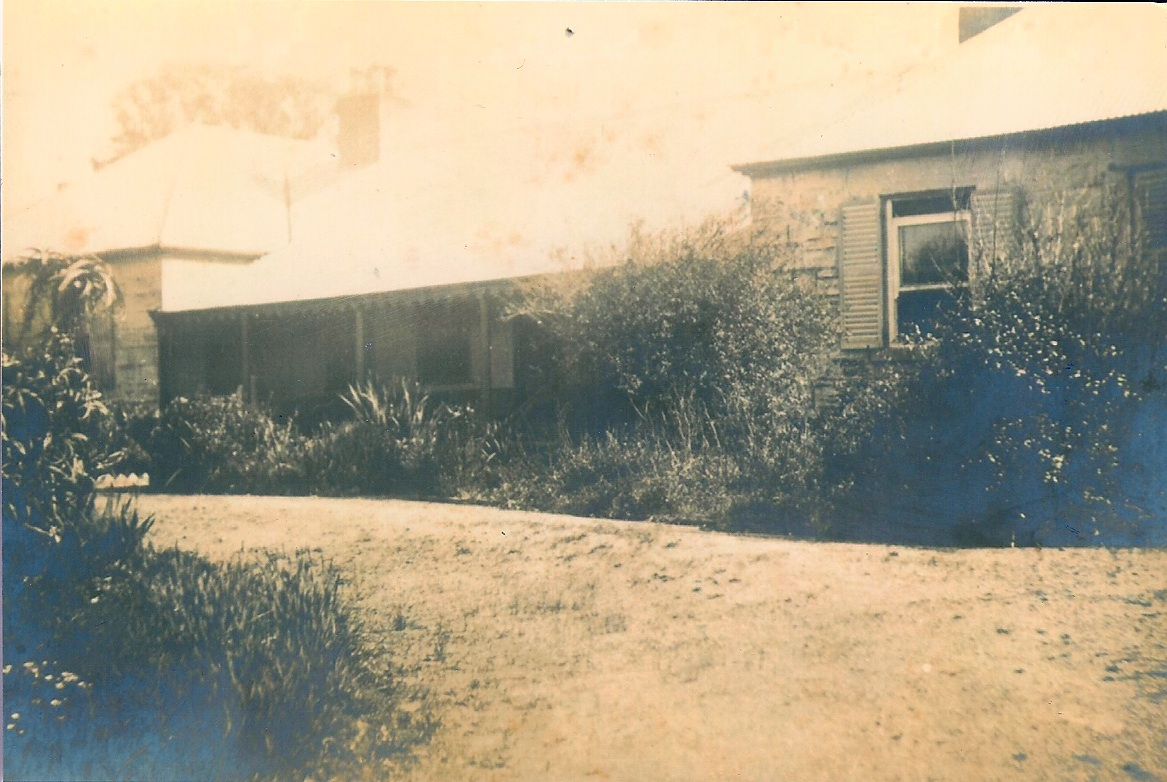
A rare photograph of Porphyry House at Seaham, pictured before its destruction in a 1939 bushfire.

Porphyry House was built in 1839/40. During a visit to Port Stephens in 1839, Lady Jane Franklin described visiting Henry Carmichael’s house at Porphyry, “a small red brick dwelling from which Mr C issued on rd (sic) to meet us – in front he is making a circular metalled carriage road”. Franklin’s visit predated the construction of the more substantial Porphyry House with cellar, although the carriageway she describes would later arrive at this second, symmetrical homestead with two wings on either side of a recessed verandah. When this house and its contents of early colonial records and furniture was destroyed in a 1939 bushfire, the destruction was described by the Newcastle and Hunter District Historical Society as a “national calamity”.

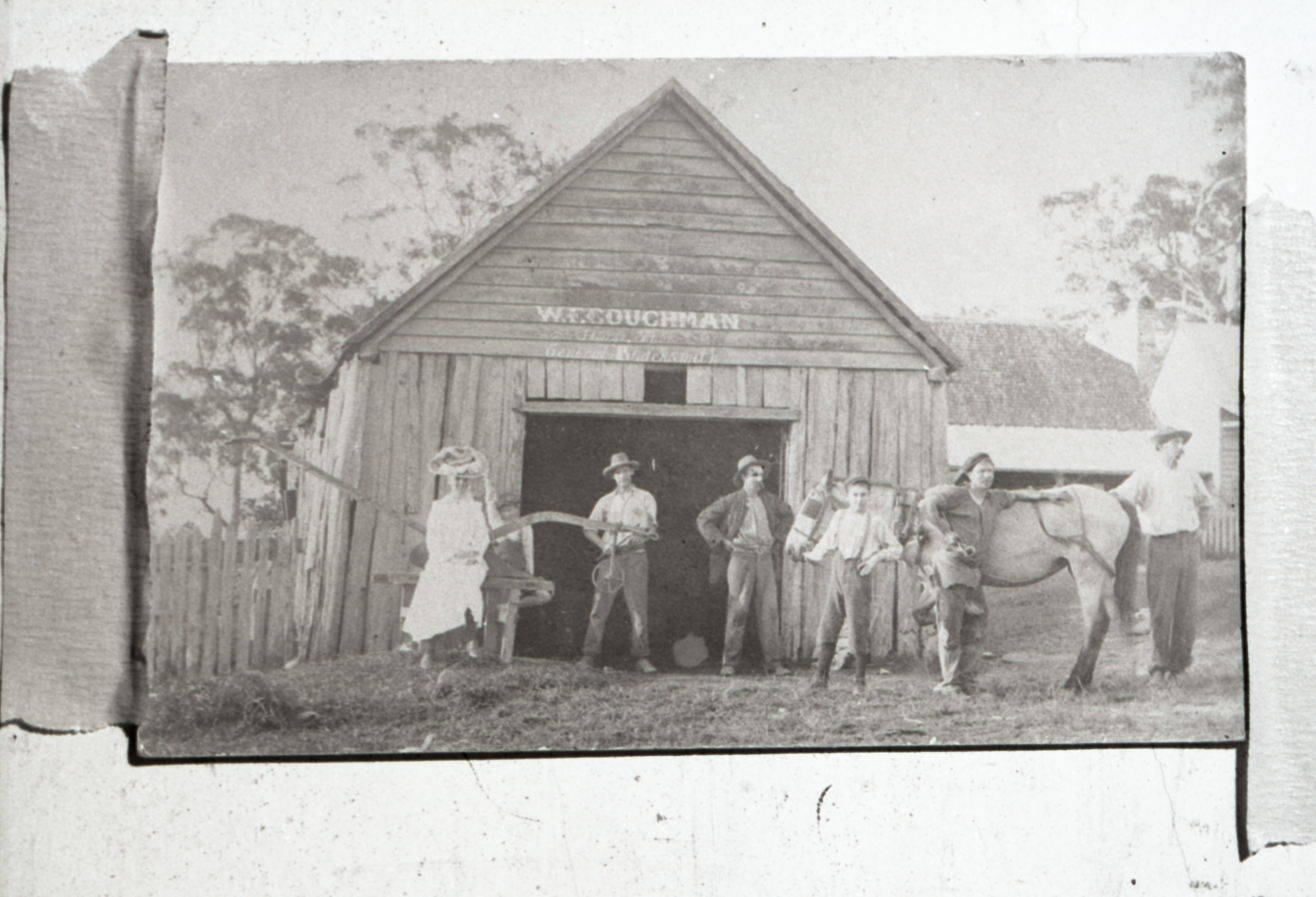
A blacksmith's shop on Dixon Street, Seaham circa 1900.

In the period from 1860 until the early 1900s, the form of the village began to alter as development moved away from the flood prone riverfront. A public house known as the Cottage of Content began operating near the intersection of Dixon Street and Clarence Town Road in January 1864. In 1878 a Presbyterian Church was built on high ground near the present-day site of Seaham Public School. In 1893 a Catholic Church, St Ita’s, was also erected on Dixon Street uphill from the brick schoolhouse and teacher’s residence. An Anglican Church, St Andrew’s, had earlier been built in 1860/61 on the lowland behind the first schoolhouse and close to the first Seaham Hotel. Upriver, about midway between the punt crossing and Porphyry House, a Mutual Improvement Association Hall had been built (circa 1865) and a Mr Abel Pyres kept a butcher shop somewhere in proximity.

On the death of Alexander Warren in 1876, the 'Brandon' estate passed to William Fisher. Fisher had come to live with Warren in about 1861 when he was 16 years old. His exact relationship to Warren is not known but apparently close. Eight years after Warren's death, Fisher replaced the original house with a 'handsome country villa' built of bricks made on the estate and rendered with cement to resemble stone. The architect was J W Pender of West Maitland and on completion the new house was described as follows: "...though not aspiring to any grandeur, [it] has an attractive, ornamental appearance, and has been finished in excellent taste". It was reported that "no expense has apparently been spared to make the premises as complete as possible" and it was swiftly decided that the new villa at "Brandon" afforded "the greatest credit on all concerned". Tragedy struck the Fisher family in 1901/2 when an outbreak of pneumonia claimed four members of the extended family, including two unmarried daughters living at "Brandon".

North of the village, on land that had originally been part of the "Porphyry" estate, another substantial home was built in or around 1870. This property, "Felspar", was occupied by a daughter of Henry Carmichael when, in June 1888, a bushfire almost destroyed it. Two pigs in the yard were not so lucky, both "roasted in their stye".

In 1893 homes near the Williams River were inundated during a disastrous flood that caused considerable damage and loss of livestock.

In 1902, Walter Bennett MP opened a new School of Arts hall addressing Warren Street. Built by Charles Boots and Sons of Raymond Terrace, the new building was a hall 25 feet by 50 feet with two similar anti rooms 10 feet by 12 feet. The contract price was £204 and the Seaham Mutual Improvement Society's library (50 volumes) and bookcase was moved into one of the anti rooms. This society had previously operated out of a hall somewhere near the punt crossing. Additional books were received by patron G T Carmichael, a son of Henry Carmichael, and the State Public Library. Almost destroyed in a 1926 bushfire, and saved "only with the greatest good fortune" after catching alight in the more serious 1939 conflagration, the School of Arts endures as the only original public building in Seaham today.

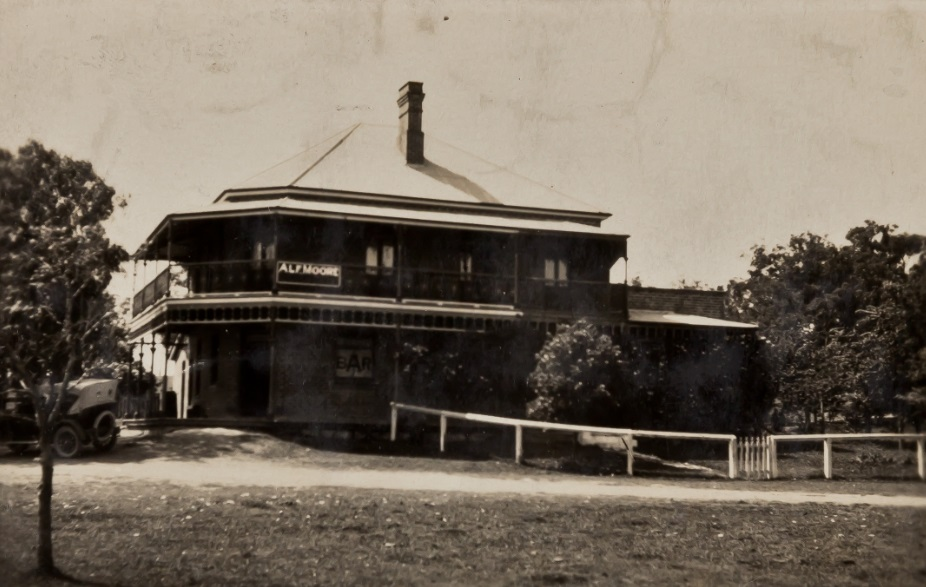
The second Seaham Hotel, built at the 'turn o'er the ways' intersection c1903 and destroyed by fire 1935.

The following year, amidst great speculation that the North Coast railway line could run through the village, construction started on a new hotel at Seaham. Built near the intersection of Dixon Street and Clarence Town Road, a junction known as 'the turn o'er the ways', Thomas McDonald's two-storeyed Seaham Hotel carried the name of the much earlier public house that had operated from the old pound in the 1850s. This later hotel, however, was without local comparison. Designed by the architect J. W. Scobie, who with fellow architect Arthur Lee had earlier designed the town hall at West Maitland (1889), the Seaham Hotel was of brick and contained 14 rooms. Constructed "in the most up to date style for a hotel", it provided much improved facilities to Seaham's passing trade. This included the coroner. The cellars of hotels, especially those in remote villages such as Seaham, were the preferred location to store the remains of any deceased whose death might necessitate an inquest. Pulled from the river at nearby Glen Oak wharf, 22-year-old George Whitely was thus an early guest at the Seaham Hotel when he was laid out there in 1906. Mr E. Piper, the visiting coroner, made a finding of accidental drowning and the young man was buried at the Seaham Cemetery under a headstone that was "erected by a few of his friends".

The hotel was rarely at capacity. A decision to send the North Coast railway via Paterson rather than Seaham and Clarence Town extinguished any hope that the town would receive busier trade. It was delicensed in 1932 and 'robbed of its former glory', went up in flames one night in September 1935. Twenty years earlier, and directly across the road in Dixon Street, the former Cottage of Content had met a similar fate, killing 84-year old Martha Sweeney who had been locked inside "to prevent her from wandering about [at night]". The destruction of both premises left the 'turn o'er the ways' with no landmarks.

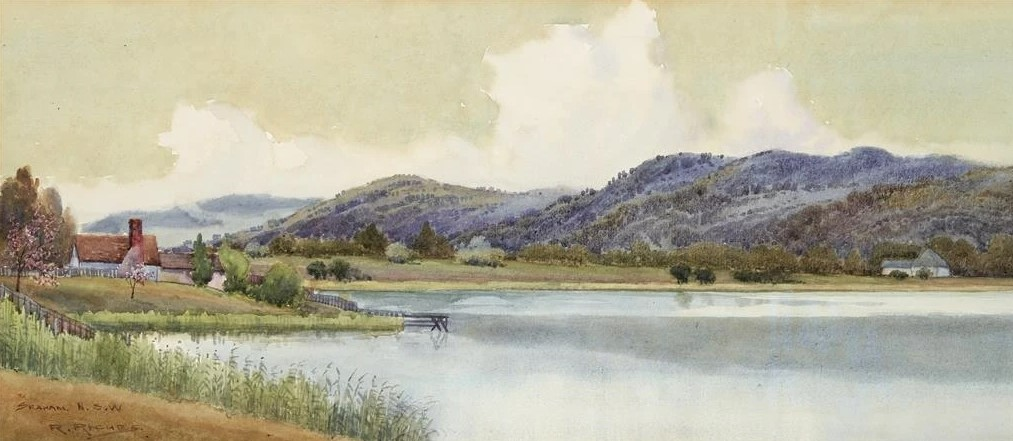
A watercolour of the river at Seaham by the artist Robert Riches c1900. Old Porphyry House visible in the distance on the right.

When it wasn't in flood, as was the case notably in 1857, 1893 and 1913, the "entrancing beauty" of the river at Seaham attracted considerable interest from visiting artists. W. Lister Lister (1859–1943), seven-time recipient of the Wynne Prize, "often" visited, capturing the scene slightly upstream at "Langlands". Robert Riches was another regular, his watercolour landscape of "Felspar" reproduced as a postcard for wide enjoyment. Writers were also drawn to the area, among them J. H. M. Abbott who wrote a story titled "The Witch of Frasers Flat" about a sorceress who kept a small cottage at the foot of a mountain near the punt at Seaham. Abbott drew on folklore as well as historical accounts, although the origins of this story remain unknown.

Wilton Hack (1843–1923) was another artist and "utopist" with connections to Seaham. He had lived on a farm called "Collingrove" near Tumbledown Creek during much of the 1880s. The locale would become known as Glen Oak during his tenure, although prior to the 1880s most of its inhabitants were identified on electoral rolls and census returns as living in either Seaham or Clarence Town. During his time in the district, Hack patented a stump extractor called "Little Demon". He would go on to establish a communal settlement at Mount Remarkable, South Australia, preside over a Buddhist boys school, serve as a magistrate, and write books on The Battle of Life, The Human Soul, and the Occult and Psychic Phenomena.

=== War and an 'Important Discovery' (1915–1939) ===
In 1914, an "important discovery" was made at Seaham by the famous Australian geologist, Professor Edgeworth David, who identified that rocks at Seaham were of glacial origin, with an estimated age of between 90 and 120 million years old. The material of the rock, streaky in appearance, was the result of the forces of moving ice overriding the sediments forming in glacial lakes. David observed that each pair of streaks in the rock represented the annual winter and summer deposits. The Seaham Quarry, as it came to be known, was also found to have arching layers that were created by the dragging force of glacier ice or ancient icebergs. In 1925 a Pan-Pacific Geology Congress brought geologists from all over the world to Seaham to inspect its unique formation. At the time when Professor David observed them, the formations – known as varve shales – were not known to exist in Australia.

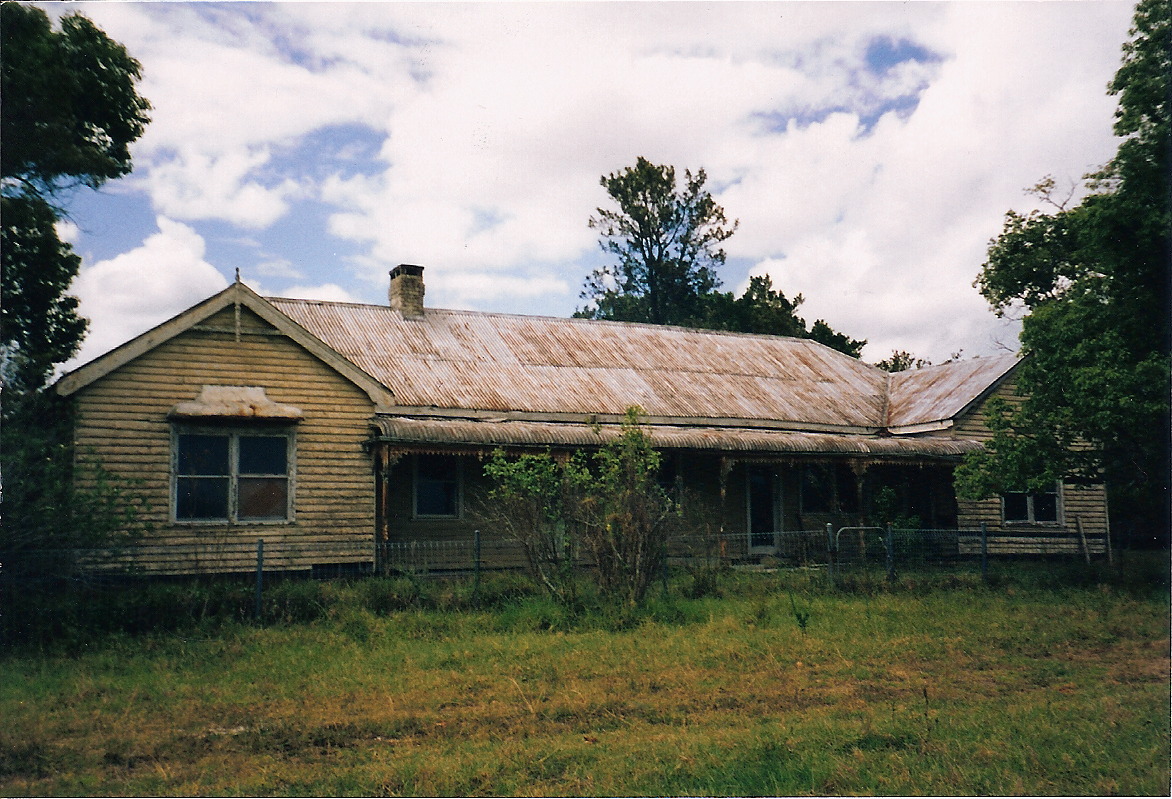
"Burnbrae", the home of John and Lavinia Boag, who lost their son William in the Great War and were instrumental in erecting the Knitting Circle Memorial.

In February 1915, a game of tug-of-war concluded the last harvest of grapes on the Porphyry vineyard. Held in the grounds of the homestead, it was to be a poignant contest. War had been declared in Europe and by 1916 the Porphyry wine label had been sold to Lindemans and the vineyard uprooted, ending eighty years of winemaking at Seaham. By the end of the Great War in 1918, a quarter of the Seaham men who had enlisted to fight had died. Among the casualties was Gavin Dickson Carmichael, the last surviving member of the Porphyry Carmichaels, killed at Passchendaele on the evening of 6 November 1917. His body was never found and he left no descendants.

The Great War had a significant impact on Seaham. No less than three memorials were dedicated to the fallen, including the 'Knitting Circle Memorial' on land donated by the Boag family of "Burnbrae", East Seaham. John Wilson Boag, a Councillor on the Raymond Terrace Municipal Council, had lost a son Trooper William Fisher Boag to injuries at the Randwick Military Hospital in 1917. Alderman Boag was so affected by his son's death that he relinquished most of his civic duties following his son's death. In a cruel twist of fate, Boag lost a second son, John, in December 1925 in a buggy accident within sight of his home "Burnbrae" and the Knitting Circle Memorial.

By war's end in 1919, there were 89 names on the electoral roll living at Seaham. This included women, who were only included on the roll after the NSW Women's Franchise Act 1902. For comparison, there had been 121 names on the 1869–70 electoral roll living at Seaham. This earlier roll did not include the female population but did pick up some of the male residents on farms at "Langlands" and "Mount Torrence" who by 1919 would have been considered living at Glen Oak. Regardless, these electoral rolls demonstrate Seaham faced a declining population at the beginning of the twentieth century.

=== Bushfires and a 'deserted village' (1939-c1973) ===
Since at least the beginning of the twentieth century, an "annual delight" in Seaham was the Presbyterian community's Christmas tree tradition. A tree would be brought to the School of Arts hall from the bush, gifts hung from its branches, and the whole arrangement decorated with miniature candles. The function would round out each year and 1938 was no exception, despite this one being an unusually nervous affair. A local correspondent, describing the mood in the hall that night, writes: "After the excellent spring, which seemed to give promise of a good season, dairy farmers generally are feeling anxious because of the prolonged dry weather, and their share of the cyclonic conditions will not easily be forgotten. Although bush fires did not come their way, huge branches of trees were broken. Flowers and gardens suffered badly".

Flowers and gardens suffered even worse three weeks later when Seaham was visited by a "red terror". A fire that had started in a gully near Paterson, driven by hot wind, quickly became out of control and swept down on Seaham around lunchtime on 14 January 1939.

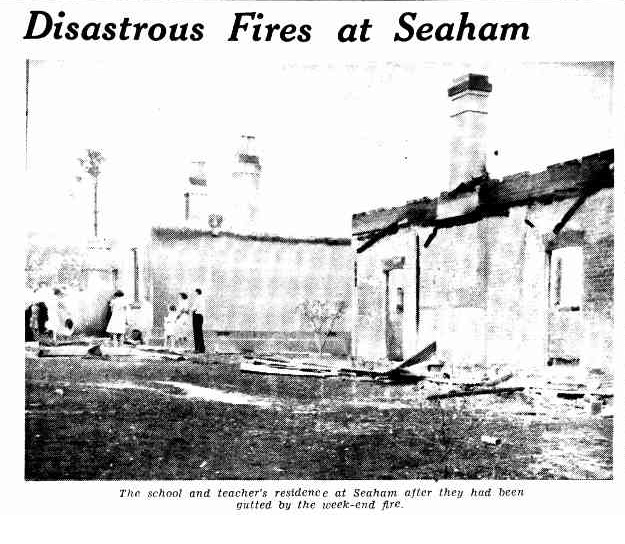
An excerpt from a newspaper account of the destruction at Seaham after the bushfire on 14 January 1939.

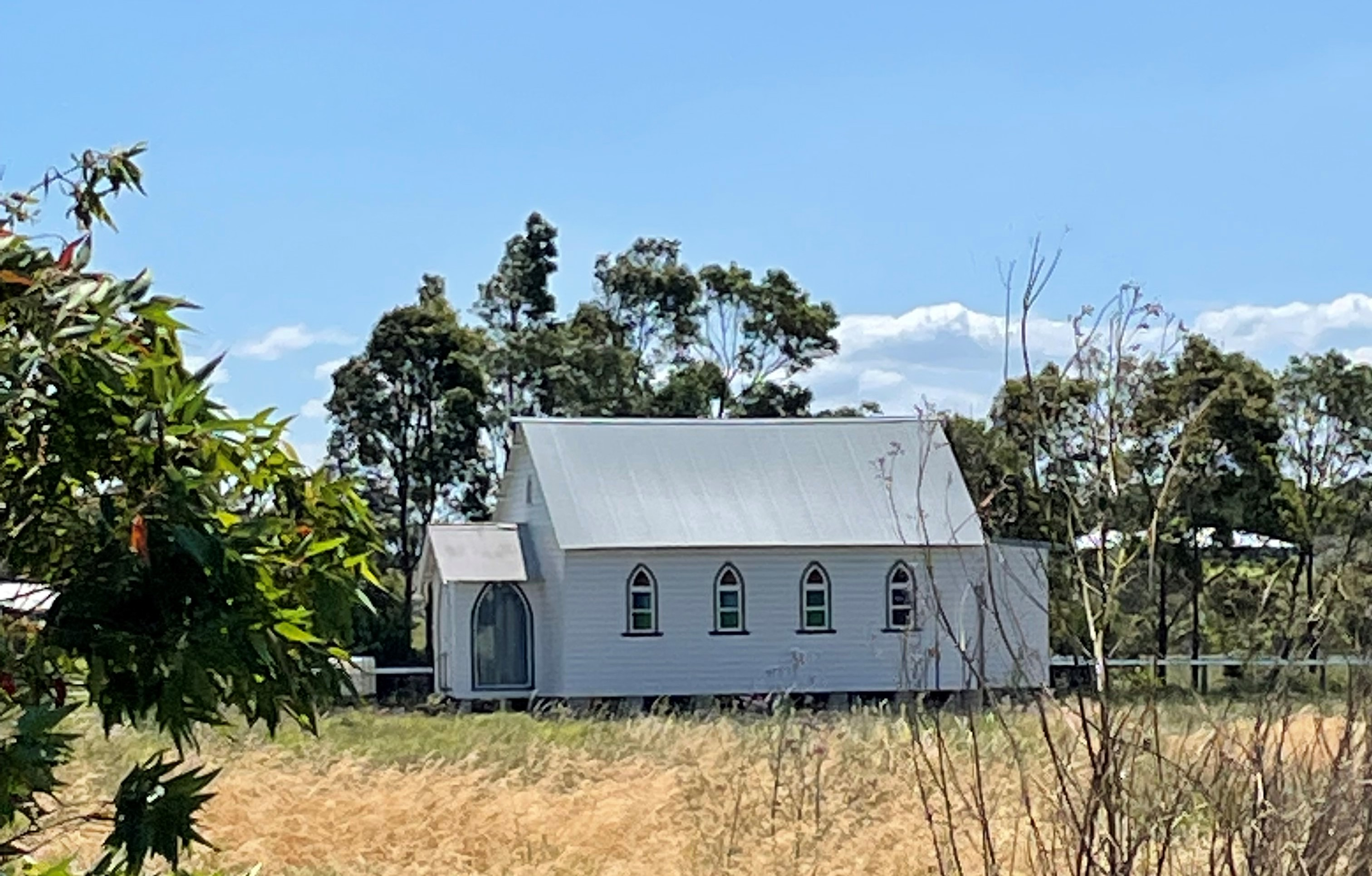
The second Presbyterian Church built in Seaham, pictured at a new location in 2022. This church was built at Seaham in 1941 after the first had been destroyed by fire in 1939.

Almost nothing was saved at "Porphyry", the destruction of which was described as a "national calamity". At neighbouring "Felspar", a c1870 homestead also built the Carmichaels, a family by the name of Graham family escaped "with the utmost difficulty" after the roof of a kitchen had collapsed in their burning home. Three automobiles went in the destruction at "Felspar", in addition to the period relics and furniture inside the homestead. In the Seaham village the fire swept across Dixon and Warren Streets, razing the Presbyterian Church, public school and teacher's residence. The wooden Catholic Church, post office, and c1902 School of Arts were all saved. A "desperate battle" was fought at "Brandon", south of the town proper, where two homes were lost. A "good save was effected" at the c1884 homestead, built close to the site of Alexander Warren's original home, where the fire was extinguished at the backdoor.

1939 was not done with Seaham, or the world for that matter. On 3 September, the Australian Prime Minister Robert Gordon Menzies announced the beginning of Australia's involvement in the Second World War on every national and commercial radio station in Australia. Seaham, still in ruins, was also contending with a local outbreak of influenza. Rebuild efforts would have to wait.

It was not until 1967/8 that a new schoolhouse and teacher's residence was built at Seaham. In the intervening years, an old schoolhouse known as Greswick (closed in 1937) had been pressed into service. Removed from a site at East Seaham, the 'Greswick school' was brought across the river to Seaham and re-erected near the site of the destroyed c1885 schoolhouse.

Seaham's Presbyterians, evidently more motivated than the NSW Department of Education, replaced their church with a new build in 1941. Erected on the site of the original c1878 church, the opening on October 11 included special thanks to "Rev H. Linton for placing at the disposal of Presbyterians the Church of England building [St Andrews] during the time they were without a building". The Catholics next door at St. Ita's, "saved only with the greatest good fortune" in 1939, were feeling less neighbourly. Two days earlier, the Catholic Freeman's Journal provided notice that the District Board had taken "the necessary action to close the [branch] at St Ita's No. 423, Seaham", going on to explain that "there was little, if any, prospect of increase in membership, and it was felt that by transferring the members to adjacent branches, there would be a greater security in respect of their continuity of membership." Ergo, the net gain to Seaham's religious communities in October 1941 was nil. St. Ita's was either demolished or removed in subsequent years.

A diminishing congregation would eventually also claim the second Presbyterian Church. In 1966 it was removed to Raymond Terrace where it continued to operate for many years as St Andrews Presbyterian Church. It was removed, for a second time, in the 2020s and is now a private residence in Millers Forest.

The stone Anglican Church of St. Andrews, the oldest place of worship in the town, would continue to serve its congregation until its sale in 2019.

In 1944, another bushfire swept down on Seaham and nearby Glen Oak. The fire was blocked on Clarence Town Road near the Glen Oak School of Arts. At Seaham, the fire was reported to have jumped the Williams River at Felspar.

The town came under threat from another bushfire on the night of 15 November 1951.

In 1973, historian Cecily Joan Mitchell wrote of the town: "Seaham is now an example of a deserted village. If it were not for its rare showing of geological strata and the fact that its new weir is always in the news, and the Williams River with its low banks is used for water ski-ing and sculling, few people would know of its existence".

=== 'An era ends, an era begins' (1973 – Present) ===
In 1967, the Hunter District Water Board had commissioned a weir on the Williams River at Seaham. Engineers expected a rock wall would remove salt from the upper reaches of the river, allowing it to be pumped through a canal across Balickera to a drinking water supply dam at Grahamstown. The project was 'trouble-plagued' from the beginning and not without its critics. Farmers feared the weir would change the flood pattern at Seaham and ruin valuable land. Water turbulence gradually removed the fines from the rock face and water continued to seep upriver from Seaham. The water board eventually called world-wide tenders for the sealing of the weir and in 1974 the French firm S. I. F. Bachy Enterprise won the contract. Using a method that, at the time, was untried anywhere in the world, engineers drilled the rock and filled the holes with an impervous grout. In response to representations, the water board also built flood gates into the 360m weir to allow better control of the water. At a total cost of $10.5 million, and after the weir was eventually sealed, it was opened in March 1979 by the NSW Deputy Premier and Minister for Public Work, Jack Ferguson.

The Seaham Weir was not the only alteration to life in Seaham during the 1970s. The old punt, which had plied across the river from a ramp at Torrence Street since at least the 1860s, was "in danger of sinking" by 1971. It was the last such service operating in the Lower Hunter, others long replaced by bridges, and emergency pumps were required to keep the vessel dry. On 14 February 1973 puntman Jim Salter made the final run across the river. During the first year of the weir's construction he had worked up to 22 hours a day, "collapsing two or three times". A bridge replaced the service two months later, opened by the NSW Minister for Transport Milon Morris. At a cost of $300,000, it provided "the security of flood free access for the people living on the eastern side of the river as they bring their products to the markets and saleyards at Maitland".

One of Seaham's longest-lived residents, Maud Mary McDonald, died in 2012 at the age of 103. She had been born only 7 years after another resident, William Cunningham died at the disputed age of 103. These two long lives, nearly overlapping, could almost condense the entire history of Seaham into two lifespans across four centuries.
