= Brandy Hill, New South Wales =

Brandy Hill New South Wales
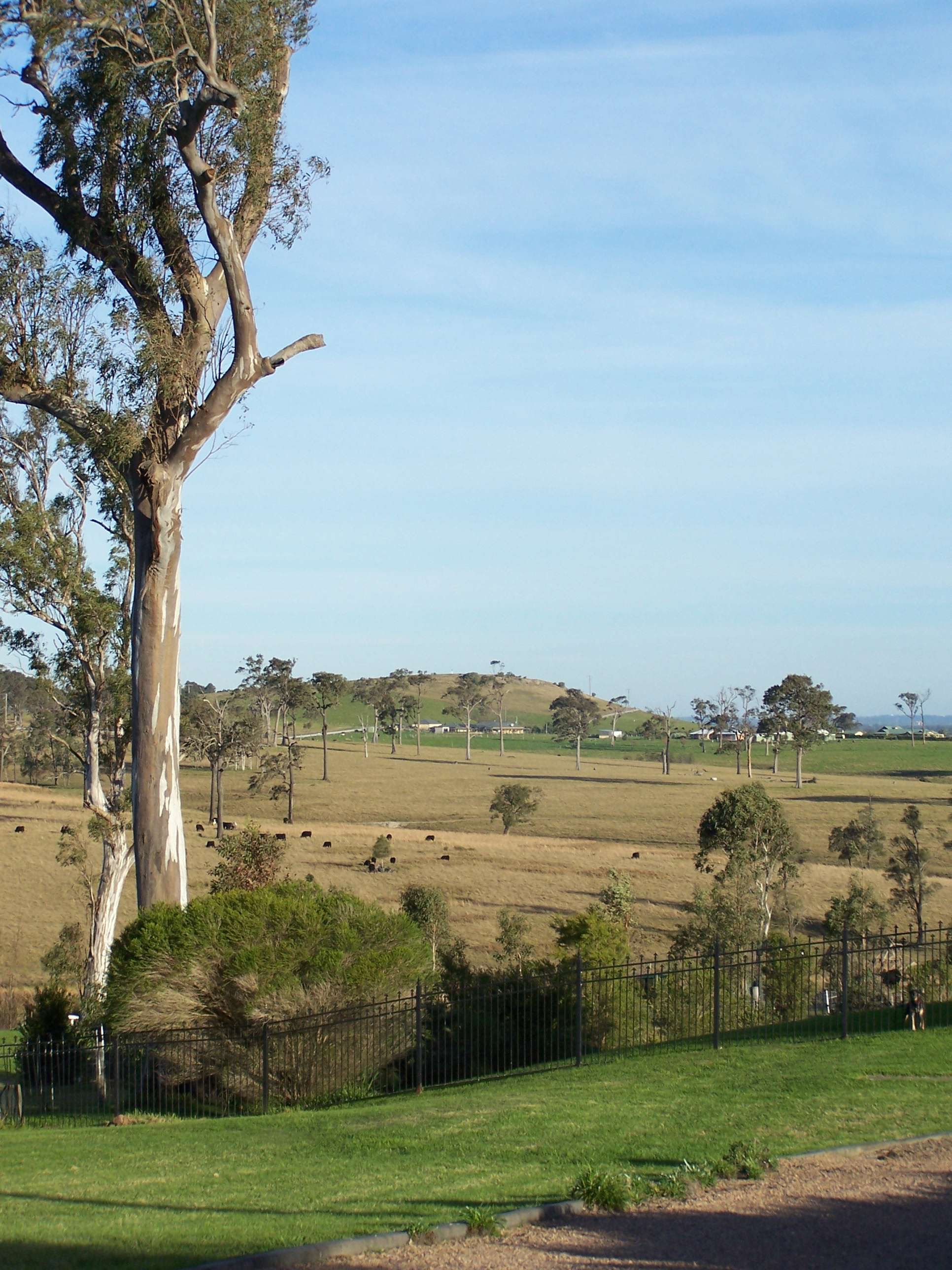
- Looking from Brandy Hill across the site of Ahalton Farm, towards Mount Kanwary.

- Coordinates: 32°41′40.3″S 151°41′35.5″E
- Population: 713 (SAL 2021)
- Established: 1986
- Postcode(s): 2324
- Area: 6.5 km^{2} (2.5 sq mi) (Note: Area calculation is based on 1:100000 map 9232 Newcastle.)
- Time zone: AEST (UTC+10)
  - Summer (DST): AEDT (UTC+11)
- Location: 175 km (109 mi) N of Sydney; 36 km (22 mi) NNW of Newcastle; 10.7 km (7 mi) NW of Raymond Terrace; 20 km (12 mi) NW of Maitland
- LGA(s): Port Stephens Council
- Region: Hunter
- County: Durham
- Parish: Seaham
- State electorate(s): Port Stephens
- Federal division(s): Lyne
Mean max temp	Mean min temp	Annual rainfall
29.6 °C; 85 °F	6.1 °C; 43 °F	925.2 mm 36.4 in
Suburbs around Brandy Hill:
Seaham	Seaham	Seaham
Seaham	Brandy Hill	Seaham
Wallalong, Nelsons Plains	Nelsons Plains	Nelsons Plains

Brandy Hill is a suburb of the Port Stephens local government area in the Hunter Region of New South Wales, Australia. It was originally farmland but was subdivided in the 1980s and now supports a population of over 700 people living on large, primarily residential, blocks. It overlooks working farmland and offers superb views of the greater Morpeth area, with visibility extending to Maitland.

== Geography ==
Brandy Hill is primarily an elevated suburb, with the residential area approximately 20–40 m (66–131 ft) above sea level. (Note: Elevations are based on 1:100000 map 9232 Newcastle.) To the north and east the suburb is bordered by Seaham, while to the south and west the suburb is surrounded by the Hunter River floodplains in Nelsons Plains, Wallalong and Seaham.

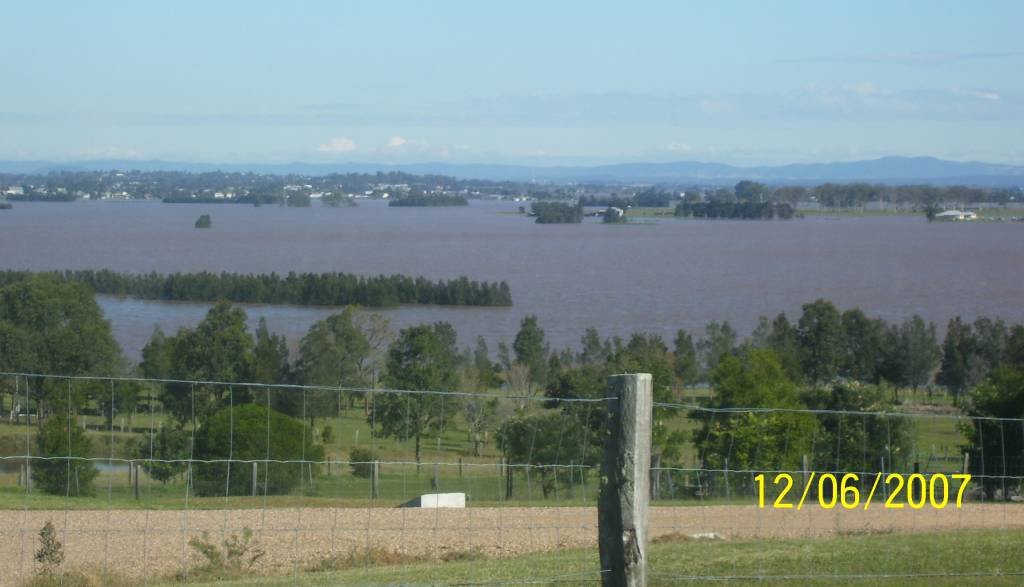
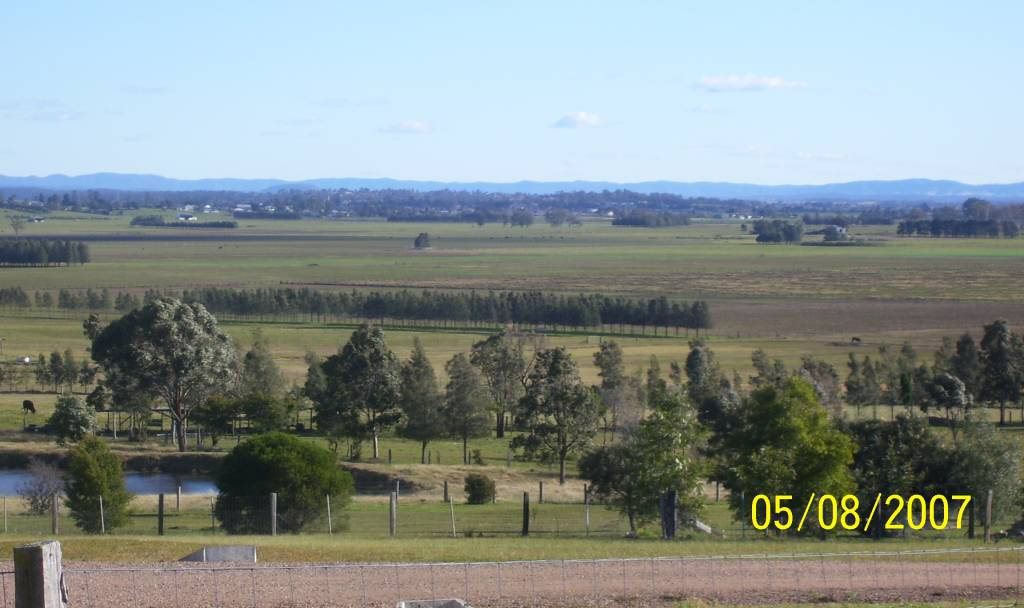
Views towards Hinton from Brandy Hill across the Hunter River floodplains. The left image was taken shortly after the June 2007 Hunter Region and Central Coast storms, while the right image is of the same area after the floodwaters had subsided.

== History ==
=== First inhabitants ===
In 1938, Walter John Enright wrote of the district's traditional owners:

"When the first settlers arrived in Seaham, the land was occupied by the Garewagal, a clan or sept of the Worimi. The territory of the Worimi was bounded by the Hawkesbury and Manning Rivers respectively on the south and north, the ocean on the east, and extended as far west as the junction of Glendon Brook and the Hunter River. The language was called Kattang. It was not as complex as that of the people further north on the coast. The name of the sept is derived from 'gal' or 'kal' meaning a division or clan, and 'Garewa,' the sea. The Hunter was the southern boundary, Port Stephens the north, the ocean the east, and they roamed inland as far as Glendon Junction.They were food gatherers, that is to say, they did not cultivate but gathered whatever was found in a state of nature, whether of vegetable or animal life, except such as were poisonous and in the latter class they did not consider snakes... Totemism was one of the most important features of his (sic) life. Each individual had a totem and there was also a totem for the female clan and another for the male clan, and the Karaji had also a totem. No individual would kill or gather what was his totem...For carrying food, bags of excellent quality were made of native twine as was also the scoop net used for fishing. Water was carried in a hollowed piece of wood or bark. Fishing hooks were made of shell."

On the impacts of colonisation in the Seaham district, Enright says:

"Within the space of this article it is only possible to touch, and that lightly, on certain aspects of the native life. The newcomers who dispossessed the native of his hunting grounds without compensating him did not understand his language nor did they know his culture. The native was cowed by the power and culture of the white. He was crushed and humiliated when he saw the grounds that were sacred to him profaned and his people despised."

On the subject of massacres of Aboriginal people and Torres Strait Islander people by settlers following colonisation, Enright writes:

"History does not tell us of any direct violence offered to the whites in the district of Seaham. It is, fortunately, free of records of those brutal and cowardly massacres, not only of men, but women and children, that are such frightful blots on the history of other parts of our State. Notwithstanding that, not a single full-blooded native of the Williams River is now existing."

The Seaham district and environs, however, may not have been entirely without such "frightful blots" on its history. In 1877, a massacre at nearby Wallalong was recounted in correspondence published by the Maitland Mercury and Hunter River General Advertiser:

"[Traditional owners] suffered a good deal of injustice at the hands of some of the first settlers, and there is now living a man who was present, as he admits, when a party had formed for the purpose of punishing the blacks for pulling the cobs of maize in the field, and carrying it off in their nets to their camps. Observing some smoke rising from the midst of the Wallalong bush, they armed themselves with muskets, and reached unobserved the camp, where a considerable number of men, women, and children were. They fired at once upon them, killing some and wounding others. The rest fled through the bush, pursued by the whites, and the whole of the natives took to the water intervening between the brush and the high land, towards which it gradually deepened, and some of the poor creatures were drowned. My informant, now a very old man, while expressing regret as to occurrence, said the worst part of the whole affray was, they afterwards discovered, that not one of those who were "wanted" was among them."

Reflecting on the massacre, the correspondent goes on to remark that:

"The haymakers in the Wallalong fields have little suspected the occurrence of these tragical scenes on the exact spots where they have stood when engaged in their peaceful occupation."

While the exact location of the massacre is not provided, an account of floods in 1857 describes how "the first breach it made was at Wallalong, whence the water gradually found its way over a considerable portion of Bowthorne, Hopewell, Barty's Swamps (sic), and all the low lands in that direction". To the east, Wallalong is separated from the "high land" of Brandy Hill, previously known as Ahalton and Warren's Station Paddock, by Barties Swamp. It is possible that the shootings and drownings described as occurring "between the brush and the high land" took place on or about Barties Swamp, below present-day Brandy Hill.

=== Ahalton and The Station Paddock (c1823-1870s) ===
Modern-day Brandy Hill is located on the site of Ahalton Farm and Warren's Station Paddock.

In correspondence dated 23 September 1823, James McClymont was informed that he would be granted 2000 acres in any part of the colony already surveyed as well as six convict servants who would be victualled from government stores. The land was granted in two portions – 1470 acres of land in the parish of Seaham and 530 acres in the parish of Butterwick. The property, totalling 2000 acres and covering much of present-day Brandy Hill, Wallalong, and the lowlands between, was known as "Ahalton Farm".

The McClymont's time at Ahalton, however, was to be short-lived. On or about 26 July 1825, a "desperate gang" of eleven bushrangers "plundered" the McClymont farm house, and the young family left the district soon thereafter. Upon McClymont's early death in 1829, aged 30, "Ahlaton" was advertised to be let for a term of seven years. The Sydney Gazette and New South Wales Advertiser described the property as thus:

TO be LET, for the term of seven years, possession to be given immediately, the FARM of AHALTON, consisting of 1000 acres of land, situate on Hunter's River, in the township of Durham, adjoining Nelson's Plains, with from 130 to 150 Head of Cattle, belonging to the Estate of the late Mr. James McClymont... This Estate is most eligibly situated about half a mile from navigation, commanding the run of a very extensive swamp, which, in seasons of drought, is one of its greatest advantages. It is also well watered, and being almost one of the earliest selected on that stream, has those advantages, in point of locality, others have not.

Gone too, it seems, was the "desperate gang" that had driven McClymont and his family out of "Ahalton" only four years prior:

The neighbourhood is very desirable, comprising the most respectable individuals, and equi-distant from Paterson's Plains, Wallis' Plains, and William's River, being to each only six miles.

In 1847, a Free Presbyterian Church was built at "Ahalton", close to present-day Ralston Road. Approval to sell the Ahalton Church was granted by the Synod in November 1868.

Before the construction of the Maitland Junction to Dungog branch of the North Coast Line, a railway through Morpeth and Seaham was proposed. Although the line would have posed fewer engineering obstacles than the two alternatives, there were concerns that a bridge at Morpeth would hinder shipping and that a railway through Brandy Hill was superfluous on account of it servicing only "wallabies and bandicoots [living on] land [that is] unfit for the support of any other kind of population".

Just north of Brandy Hill is the Brandy Hill quarry, which is named after the nearby hill that is approximately 180 metres (591 ft) high. Travelling between the quarry and Raymond Terrace meant travelling a circuitous route through the Seaham township so Brandy Hill Drive was constructed to provide a shorter and more direct route. At moment many local residents are fighting the expansion of Brandy Hill due to destruction of koala breeding habitat.

=== Subdivision and suburb ===
In the 1980s the land around Brandy Hill Drive was subdivided and renamed "Brandy Hill", after the hill, which is more than 2 kilometres (1.2 mi) from the northern extremity of the suburb and still in Seaham, and the quarry. Brandy Hill Drive continues to be used as an access route to the quarry, which is now operated by Hanson Australia.

On 16 April 1993 the boundaries of Brandy Hill were gazetted and on 7 April 2000 the subdivision was formerly approved as a locality and became a suburb in its own right. The suburb is almost surrounded by Seaham.
