= Wallalong, New South Wales =

Wallalong New South Wales
- Coordinates: 32°41′54″S 151°39′04″E
- Population: 938 (2011 census) (Note: ABS QuickStats data for Wallalong only covers only the residential section of the suburb. Data for the remainder of the suburb is included in the ABS QuickStats for other suburbs including Nelsons Plains and Woodville.)
  - Density: 86.9/km^{2} (224.9/sq mi)
- Postcode(s): 2320
- Elevation: 6 m (20 ft) (Note: Average elevation of the suburb as shown on 1:100000 map 9232 NEWCASTLE.)
- Area: 10.8 km^{2} (4.2 sq mi) (Note: Area calculation is based on 1:100000 map 9232 NEWCASTLE.)
- Time zone: AEST (UTC+10)
  - Summer (DST): AEDT (UTC+11)
- Location: 169 km (105 mi) N of Sydney; 41 km (25 mi) NW of Newcastle; 16 km (10 mi) WNW of Raymond Terrace; 15 km (9 mi) NE of Maitland
- LGA(s): Port Stephens Council
- Region: Hunter
- County: Durham
- Parish: Butterwick
- State electorate(s): Port Stephens
- Federal division(s): Lyne
Mean max temp	Mean min temp	Annual rainfall
29.6 °C; 85 °F	6.1 °C; 43 °F	925.2 mm 36.4 in
Suburbs around Wallalong:
Woodville	Woodville	Seaham
Woodville, Largs	Wallalong	Seaham
Largs	Phoenix Park, Hinton	Hinton

Wallalong is a rural suburb of the Port Stephens local government area in the Hunter Region of New South Wales, Australia. The suburb is bisected by High Street, along which a small residential zone of 938 people exists. To the east and west of this area the suburb is almost exclusively rural.

== First inhabitants ==
On the occasion of nearby Seaham's centenary in 1938, Walter John Enright wrote of the district's traditional owners:

"When the first settlers arrived in Seaham, the land was occupied by the Garewagal, a clan or sept of the Worimi. The territory of the Worimi was bounded by the Hawkesbury and Manning Rivers respectively on the south and north, the ocean on the east, and extended as far west as the junction of Glendon Brook and the Hunter River. The language was called Kattang. It was not as complex as that of the people further north on the coast. The name of the sept is derived from 'gal' or 'kal' meaning a division or clan, and 'Garewa,' the sea. The Hunter was the southern boundary, Port Stephens the north, the ocean the east, and they roamed inland as far as Glendon Junction.They were food gatherers, that is to say, they did not cultivate but gathered whatever was found in a state of nature, whether of vegetable or animal life, except such as were poisonous and in the latter class they did not consider snakes... Totemism was one of the most important features of his (sic) life. Each individual had a totem and there was also a totem for the female clan and another for the male clan, and the Karaji had also a totem. No individual would kill or gather what was his totem...For carrying food, bags of excellent quality were made of native twine as was also the scoop net used for fishing. Water was carried in a hollowed piece of wood or bark. Fishing hooks were made of shell."

On the impacts of colonisation in the Wallalong and Seaham districts, Enright says:

"Within the space of this article it is only possible to touch, and that lightly, on certain aspects of the native life. The newcomers who dispossessed the native of his hunting grounds without compensating him did not understand his language nor did they know his culture. The native was cowed by the power and culture of the white. He was crushed and humiliated when he saw the grounds that were sacred to him profaned and his people despised."

On the subject of massacres of Aboriginal people and Torres Strait Islander people by settlers following colonisation, Enright writes:

"History does not tell us of any direct violence offered to the whites in the district of Seaham. It is, fortunately, free of records of those brutal and cowardly massacres, not only of men, but women and children, that are such frightful blots on the history of other parts of our State. Notwithstanding that, not a single full-blooded native of the Williams River is now existing."

Wallalong, however, may not have been entirely without such "frightful blots" on its history. In 1877, a massacre at Wallalong was recounted in correspondence published by the Maitland Mercury and Hunter River General Advertiser:

"[Traditional owners] suffered a good deal of injustice at the hands of some of the first settlers, and there is now living a man who was present, as he admits, when a party had formed for the purpose of punishing the blacks for pulling the cobs of maize in the field, and carrying it off in their nets to their camps. Observing some smoke rising from the midst of the Wallalong bush, they armed themselves with muskets, and reached unobserved the camp, where a considerable number of men, women, and children were. They fired at once upon them, killing some and wounding others. The rest fled through the bush, pursued by the whites, and the whole of the natives took to the water intervening between the brush and the high land, towards which it gradually deepened, and some of the poor creatures were drowned. My informant, now a very old man, while expressing regret as to occurrence, said the worst part of the whole affray was, they afterwards discovered, that not one of those who were "wanted" was among them."

Reflecting on the massacre, the correspondent goes on to remark that:

"The haymakers in the Wallalong fields have little suspected the occurrence of these tragical scenes on the exact spots where they have stood when engaged in their peaceful occupation."

While the exact location of the massacre is not provided, an account of floods in 1857 describes how "the first breach it made was at Wallalong, whence the water gradually found its way over a considerable portion of Bowthorne, Hopewell, Barty's Swamps (sic), and all the low lands in that direction". To the east, Wallalong is separated from the "high land" of Brandy Hill, previously known as Ahalton and Warren's Station Paddock, by Barties Swamp. It is possible that the shootings and drownings described as occurring "between the brush and the high land" took place on or about Barties Swamp, between Wallalong and present-day Brandy Hill.

== Bowthorne Butter Factory ==
Opened by John Lavis trading under the name Bowthorne Creamery and Refrigeration Works. The factory was located on 62 High Street. It was reported that factory was 35 feet long, 25 feet wide and 15 feet high with 8 horse power engine which could produce 350 gallons of milk an hour. In December 1906 a cooperative was formed renamed in Bowthorne Co-operative Butter Factory LTD. The cooperative purchased the factory for £3,934 in January 1907 but Lavis stayed on as manager. The same cooperative purchased the Duckenfield Park Butter Factory at Morpeth. In 1910 Morpeth became the new headquarters.
