= Duns Creek, New South Wales =

Duns Creek
- Suburb
- Interactive map of Duns Creek
- Coordinates: 32°36′15.9″S 151°39′19″E
- Country: Australia
- State: New South Wales
- Region: Hunter
- LGA: Port Stephens Council
- Location: 182 km (113 mi) N of Sydney; 52 km (32 mi) NNW of Newcastle; 30 km (19 mi) NW of Raymond Terrace; 19 km (12 mi) NNE of Maitland
- Established: 1833

Government
  - State electorate: Port Stephens
  - Federal division: Lyne

Area (Note: Area and elevation calculations in this article are based on 1:100000 map 9232 NEWCASTLE and 1:25000 maps 92324N PATERSON and 92324S MAITLAND.)
  - Total: 27.1 km^{2} (10.5 sq mi)

Population
  - Total: 491 (2011 census)
  - Density: 18.1/km^{2} (47/sq mi)
- Time zone: UTC+10 (AEST)
  - Summer (DST): UTC+11 (AEDT)
- Postcode: 2321
- County: Durham
- Parish: Butterwick
- Mean max temp: 29.6 °C (85.3 °F)
- Mean min temp: 6.1 °C (43.0 °F)
- Annual rainfall: 925.2 mm (36.43 in)
Suburbs around Duns Creek
Martins Creek, Paterson	Martins Creek, Glen Oak	Glen Oak
Tocal	Duns Creek	Glen Oak
Tocal	Woodville, Butterwick	Seaham, Butterwick

Duns Creek (also known as Dunns Creek) is a rural residential suburb in the Hunter Region of New South Wales, Australia, located near the historic village of Paterson in the north-western corner of the Port Stephens Council local government area.

== Geography ==
The suburb is bordered in the west by the Paterson River where the land is only approximately 3 m (10 ft) above mean sea level (AMSL) and undulating with a few small hills. This continues to the eastern extent of the suburb where the a range of hills begins, just before the border with Glen Oak. Heading north the land becomes progressively more hilly, with elevations ranging from 80 to 220 m (262 to 722 ft) common and with heights peaking at 280 m (919 ft) AMSL.

The area is typically subdivided into residential lot sizes of 2–20 ha (4.9–49.4 acres) with a number of larger properties fronting the Paterson River up to 202 ha (499 acres). Other properties at the top of Duns Creek Road have sweeping views of the Paterson and Hunter valleys and out to the Tasman Sea approximately 30 km (19 mi) away. The area consistently receives good, reliable rainfall and the countryside is largely green and lush throughout the year.

In 2016, Duns Creek has a population of 546 people with the Median age being 41. 3.8% of population identify has Aboriginal and/or Torres Strait Islander. 92.5% were born in Australia with 2.4 in England, 1.1% New Zealand, 0.6% in Scotland and 0.6% in Greece. 28.2% No Religion, 25.6% Catholic, 23.4% Anglican, 8.5% Not Stated and 4.6% United Church. 0.7% speak Greek and 0.3% speak Spanish.

== History ==
Duns Creek's history is closely intertwined with the nearby village of Paterson, which was first surveyed in 1801. In December 1821 a grant of land 2.75 km (1.71 mi) to the south-west of the town was made to Captain Willian Dun, after whom Duns Creek is named. Captain Dun started a successful dairy farm which he called Duninald. It remained in family hands until 2005 when it was sold. The homestead on the farm is listed as a heritage item of both state and national significance.

The suburb has seen subdivision of larger rural blocks since the 1980s and increasingly attracted a growing "treechange" population since the late 1990s. Most smaller rural holdings operate as hobby farms used for horse riding, olive and wine growing as well as other outdoor pursuits.

=== Mahogany Ridge Resort development proposal ===
On 30 June 2000 a development proposal for a A$45 million tourist resort at Mahogany Ridge in Duns Creek was lodged with Port Stephens Council. The proposal would have, at various times, increased the population of the area by up to 1,500 people, approximately five times the permanent population, and was strongly opposed by the local community and Port Stephens Council. After continued opposition for almost seven years the matter resulted in court action by both Port Stephens Council and the Commonwealth Government in the Land and Environment Court of New South Wales and the proposal was finally defeated on 19 April 2007. The development has been replaced by a much smaller scale, upmarket rural residential subdivision.

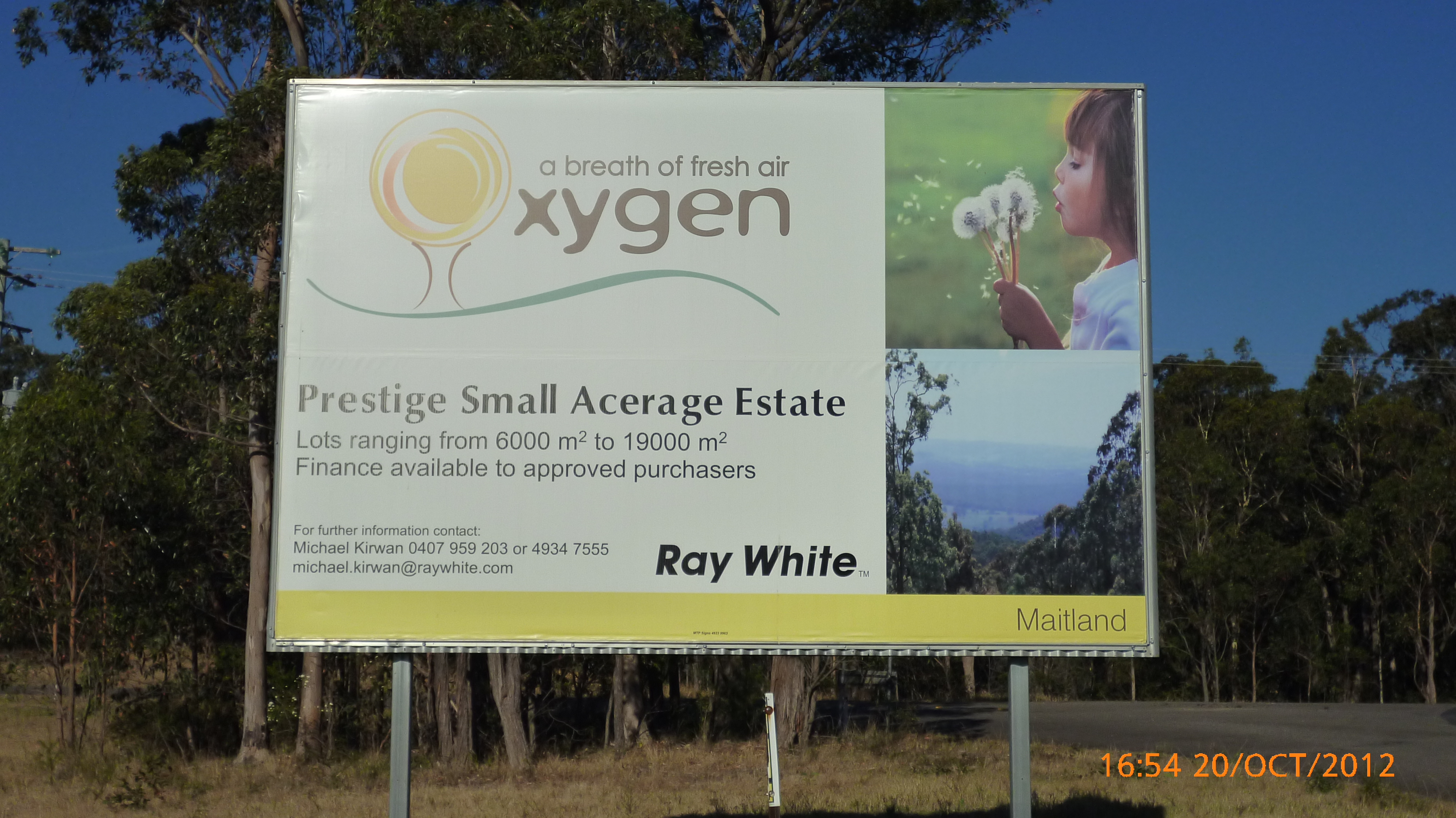
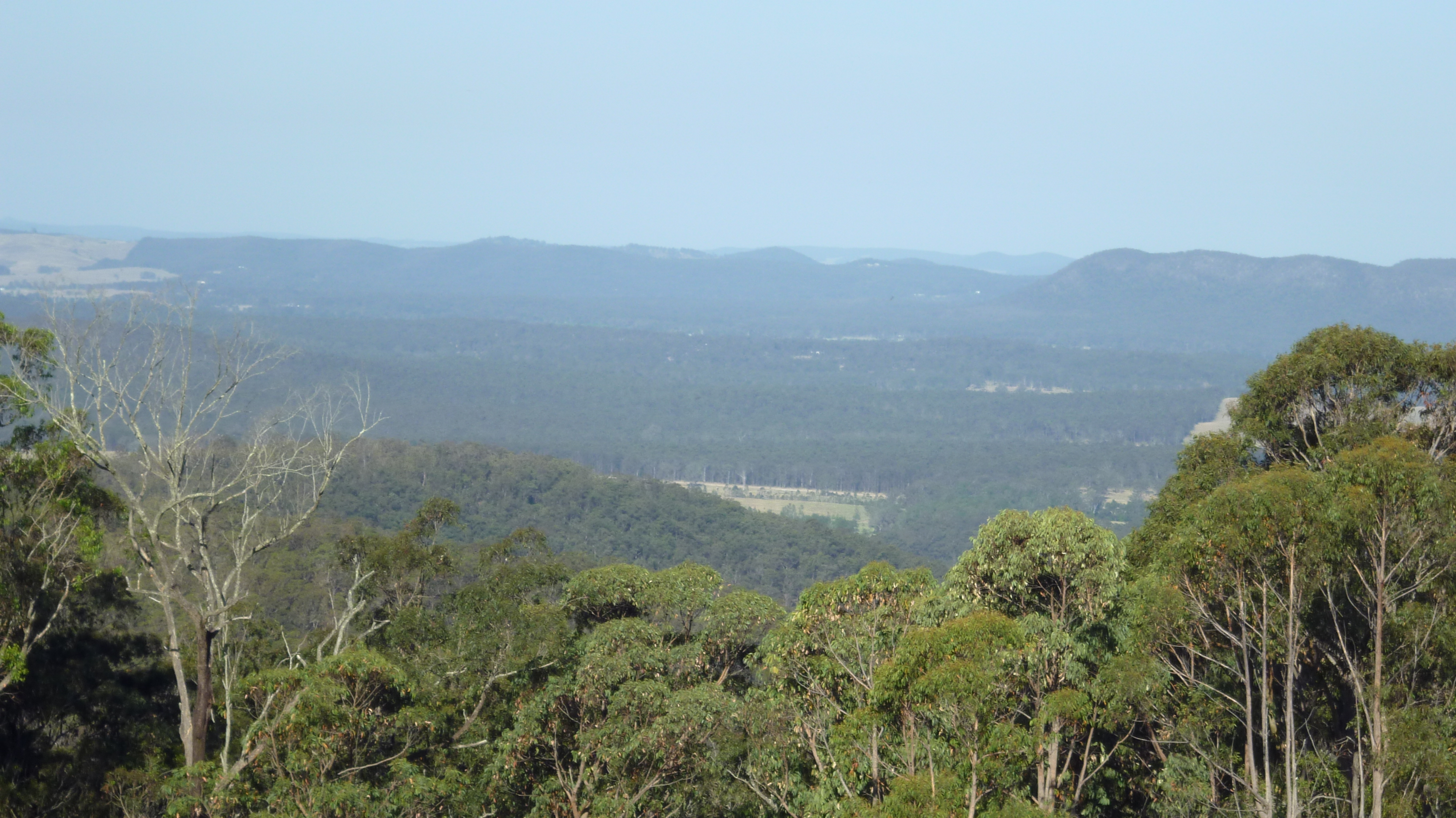
Images of what was to have been Mahogany Estate, both taken in October 2012. On the left is a sign at the intersection of Dunns Creek and Uffington roads advertising land for sale. On the right is the view to the east from one block at approximately 297 m (974 ft) above sea level.

== Transport ==
Hunter Valley Buses operates one bus route through Duns Creek:

- 185: Maitland to Gresford via Bolwarra, Largs and Paterson

== Location and amenities ==
Duns Creek has good links to major Hunter urban centres. Maitland is less than 15 minutes drive and Newcastle can be reached within 50 minutes via Raymond Terrace. Other lifestyle attractions include Nelson Bay / Port Stephens (55-minute drive) and the Hunter Valley Wine Country centred on Pokolbin (55 minutes drive). It is in close proximity to the Tocal Agricultural College (5 minutes drive) which hosts its annual small farm fields days in May each year. Regular train services at Paterson railway station on the North Coast railway line provide direct access to Maitland, Newcastle and Sydney. Newcastle Airport which has direct flights to Melbourne, Brisbane, the Gold Coast and Canberra, is located 40 minutes drive to the east at Williamtown.

Paterson, which is less than 5 minutes away by car, has all the facilities of a normal country town as well as a number of hotels, cafes and a golf course. The Woodville store, which is slightly further away, operates as a general store and post office. Both Paterson and Woodville each have long standing primary schools and other facilities including historic community halls. The privately owned sandstone 'All Saints' Church at Woodville is regularly used for wedding ceremonies and receptions. In 2006 the area was provided with ADSL internet connections and residents can now access the NBN. A daily mail service is provided to residents with parcels able to be picked up from the Woodville Store. Duns Creek also has a weekly garbage and recycling service provided by Port Stephens Council.
