= East Seaham =

East Seaham New South Wales
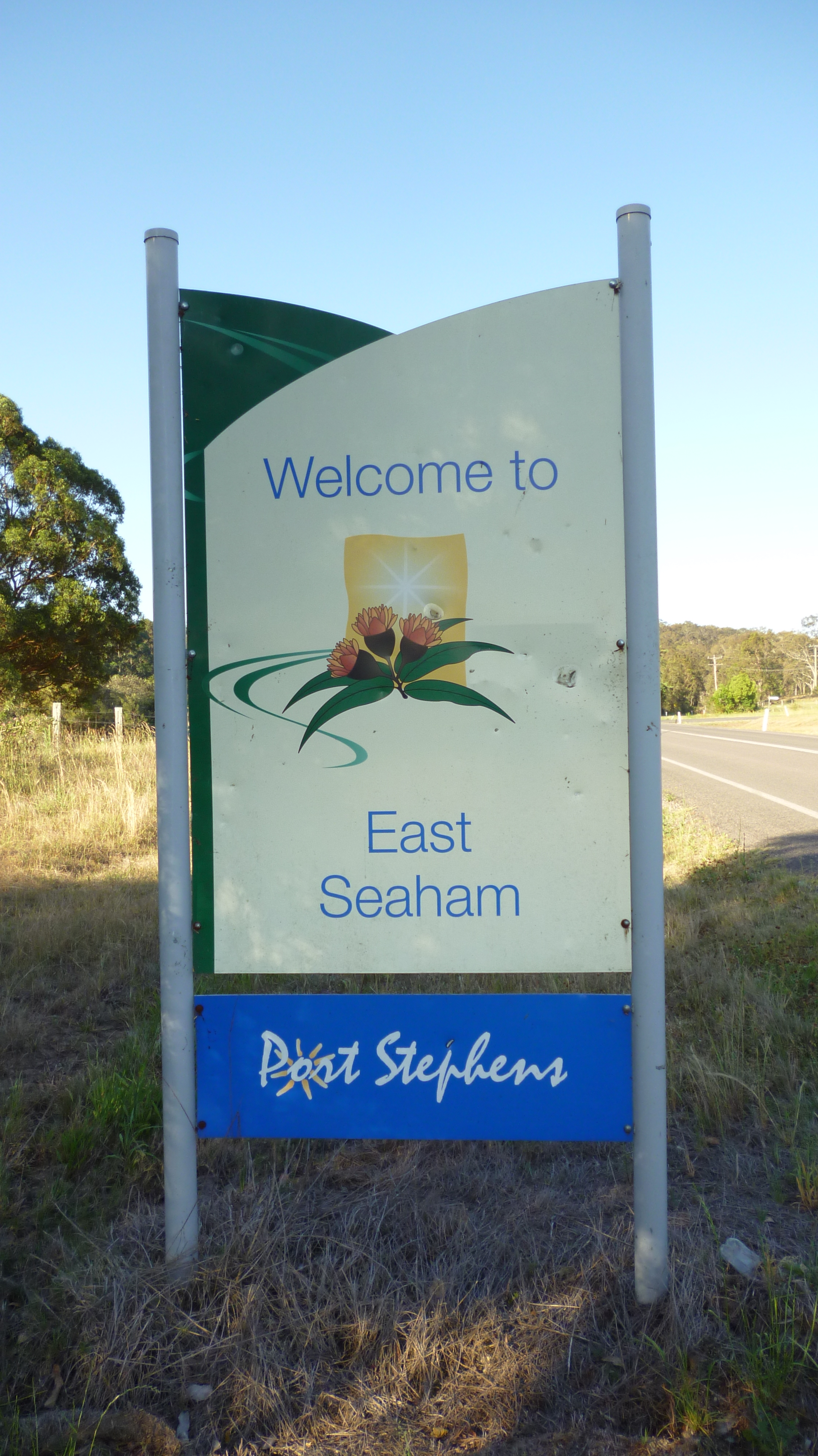
- Welcome to East Seaham sign

- Coordinates: 32°38′24″S 151°44′54″E
- Population: 353 (SAL 2021)
- Postcode(s): 2324
- Area: 37.6 km^{2} (14.5 sq mi) (Note: Area calculation is based on 1:100000 map 9232 NEWCASTLE.)
- Time zone: AEST (UTC+10)
  - Summer (DST): AEDT (UTC+11)
- Location: 178 km (111 mi) N of Sydney; 38 km (24 mi) NNW of Newcastle; 13 km (8 mi) N of Raymond Terrace
- LGA(s): Port Stephens Council
- Region: Hunter
- County: Gloucester
- Parish: Wilmot
- State electorate(s): Port Stephens
- Federal division(s): Lyne
| Mean max temp | Mean min temp | Annual rainfall |
| 27.9 °C; 82 °F | 6.4 °C; 44 °F | 1,121.3 mm 44.1 in |
Suburbs around East Seaham:
| Clarence Town | Clarence Town | Clarence Town |
| Glen Oak, Seaham | East Seaham | Balickera |
| Seaham | Eagleton | Balickera |

East Seaham is a primarily rural suburb of the Port Stephens local government area in the Hunter Region of New South Wales, Australia. It is situated on the east bank of the Williams River, opposite Glen Oak and Seaham. At the 2011 census, the population of East Seaham and the adjacent suburb of Balickera was 359, with the two suburbs having an average population density of 5.5/km^{2} (14/sq mi).

The Greswick Public School operated in East Seaham between 1895 and 1937, supported by the development of farms in and around East Seaham. The schoolhouse was moved to Seaham after a bushfire in 1939 and operated as Seaham Public School until the 1960s.
