= Hinton, New South Wales =

Hinton New South Wales
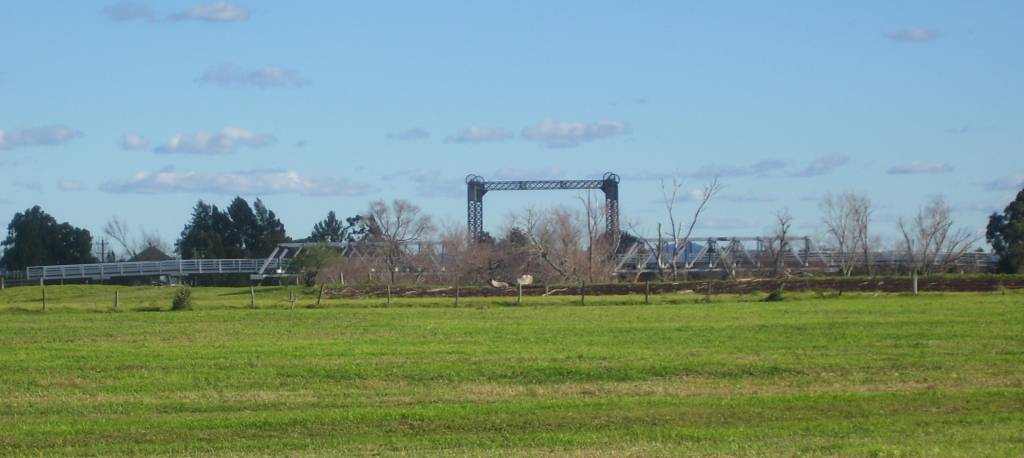
- Historic Hinton bridge, built in 1901

- Coordinates: 32°43′S 151°39′E
- Population: 471 (2021 census)
  - Density: 48.06/km^{2} (124.5/sq mi)
- Postcode(s): 2321
- Elevation: 6 m (20 ft) (Note: This is the average elevation of the township. The surrounding farmland is almost at river level as shown on 1:100000 map 9232 NEWCASTLE.)
- Area: 9.8 km^{2} (3.8 sq mi) (Note: Area calculation is based on 1:100000 map 9232 NEWCASTLE.)
- Time zone: AEST (UTC+10)
  - Summer (DST): AEDT (UTC+11)
- Location: 168 km (104 mi) N of Sydney; 39 km (24 mi) NW of Newcastle; 13 km (8 mi) WNW of Raymond Terrace; 11 km (7 mi) ENE of Maitland
- LGA(s): Port Stephens Council
- Region: Hunter
- County: Durham
- Parish: Seaham
- State electorate(s): Port Stephens
- Federal division(s): Lyne
Suburbs around Hinton:
Wallalong	Wallalong	Seaham
Phoenix Park	Hinton	Osterley
Morpeth	Morpeth, Berry Park, Duckenfield	Millers Forest, Duckenfield

Hinton is a suburb of the Port Stephens local government area in the Hunter Region of New South Wales, Australia. Primarily rural, the largest population centre is the township of Hinton, which is situated on the Paterson River, near to the confluence of the Hunter and Paterson rivers. In 1835 the post office requested a name for the town and the surveyor general suggested Hinton prior to this it was known as the second arm of the Hunter river. The first European settlers were 12 ex convicts in 1818.

== Floods ==
Due to the close proximity of the Hunter and Paterson rivers and the low elevation of surrounding ground the town is often isolated for a number of days during periods of exceptionally high rainfall. Most recently this happened in March 2000 and June 2007.

== Hinton School of Arts ==
Located on 279 Hinton is large sandstone building a brick structure. On 12 December 1868 tenders were released for the creation of the building. The builder was J Coulton and architects were Bell and Franklin. The Foundation Stone was laid in February 1869. It was finished and opened on 25 September 1869.

== Hinton Baptist Church ==
In 1848 it started as a Sunday School in a home then a hall. Rev Phillip Lane joined the fellowship and began the first pastor in August 1856. He had a many skills as oversaw the construction of the church from the existing building. The church formally opened on 16 July 1857 as the third Baptist church building in Australia.

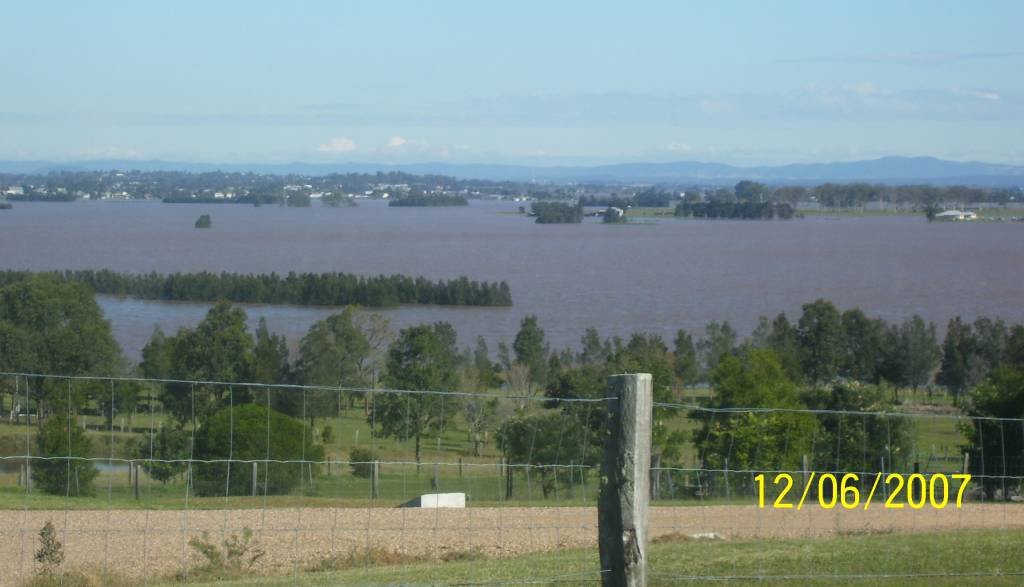
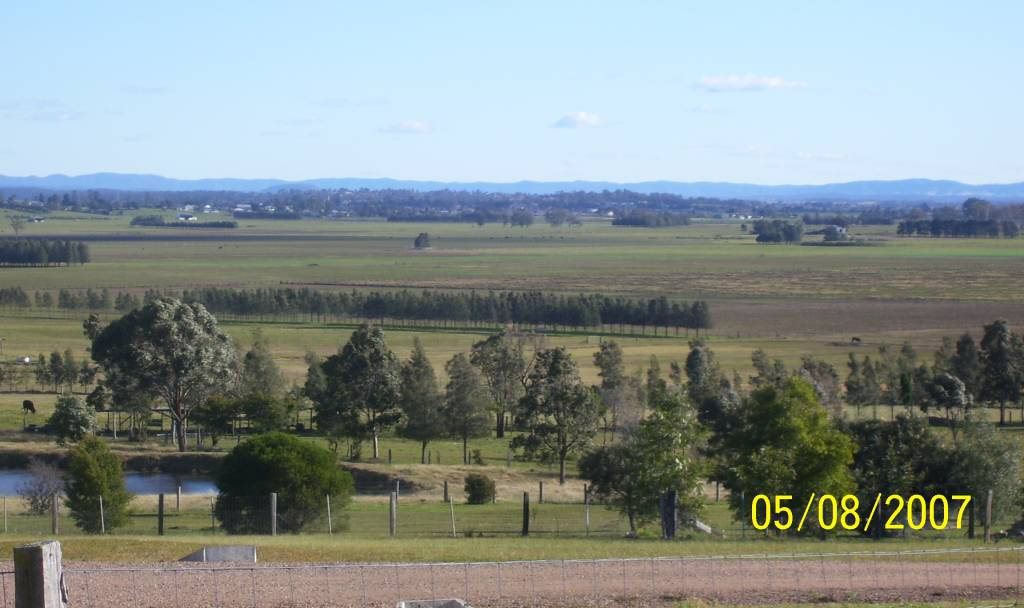
Left image shows Hinton from Brandy Hill, shortly after the June 2007 Hunter Region and Central Coast storms. The right image was taken after the floodwaters had subsided.

== Heritage listings ==
Hinton has a number of heritage-listed sites, including the Paterson River bridge

== Population ==
At the 2021 Census, the population of Hinton was 471. 92.1% of people were born in Australia and 97.9% of people spoke only English at home. The most common responses for religion were Catholic 39.1% and Anglican 23.4%.
