= Glen Oak, New South Wales =

Glen Oak
- Suburb
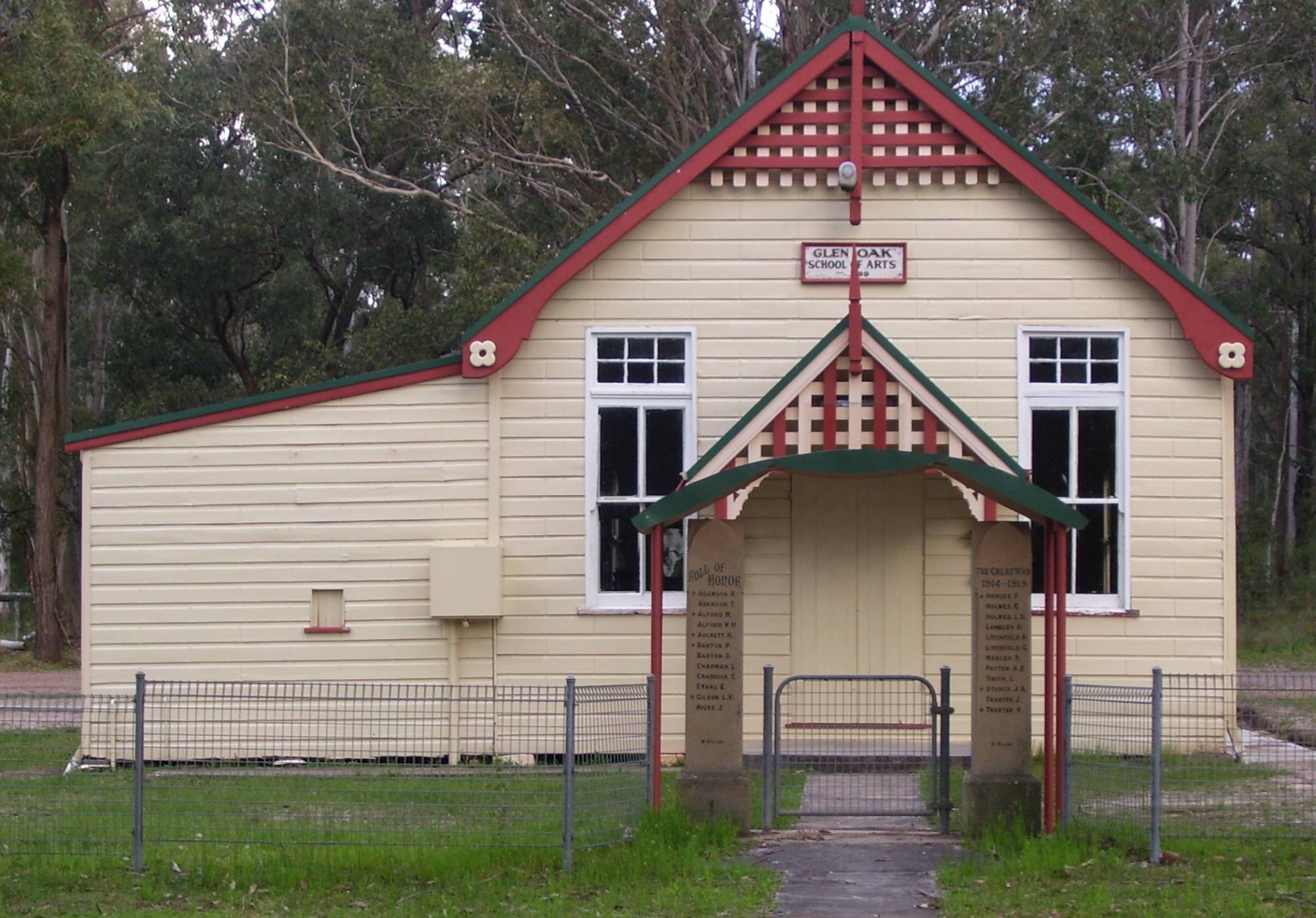
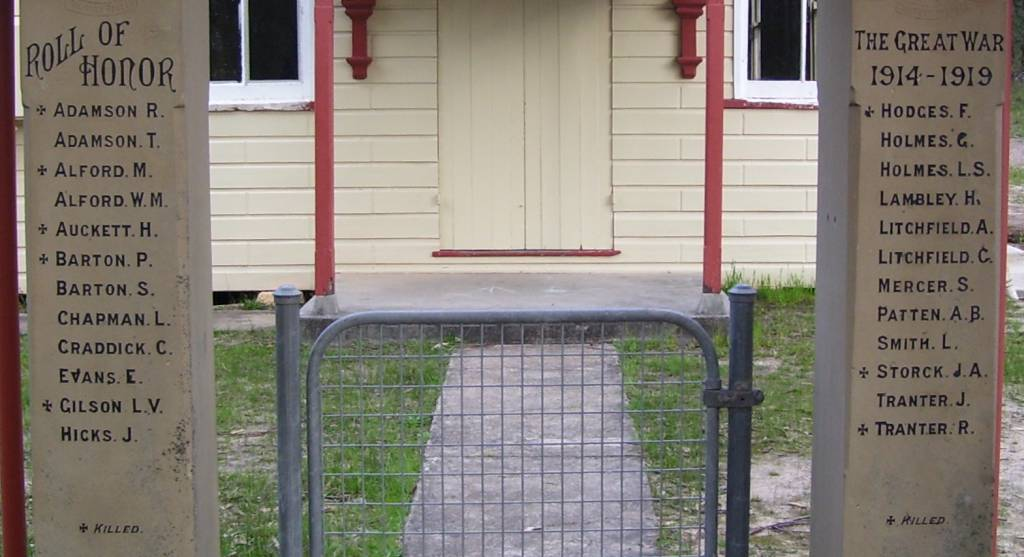
- Glen Oak School of Arts (1899) Detail of the Rolls of Honour at the entrance to the School of Arts hall

- Interactive map of Glen Oak
- Coordinates: 32°36.2′S 151°41.6′E
- Country: Australia
- State: New South Wales
- Region: Hunter
- LGAs: Port Stephens Council; Dungog Shire Council
- Location: 186 km (116 mi) N of Sydney; 48 km (30 mi) NNW of Newcastle; 23 km (14 mi) NNW of Raymond Terrace; 28 km (17 mi) NNE of Maitland

Government
  - State electorate: Port Stephens
  - Federal division: Lyne

Area (Note: Area calculation is based on 1:100000 map 9232 NEWCASTLE.)
  - Total: 45.1 km^{2} (17.4 sq mi)

Population
  - Total: 426 (SAL 2021)
  - Density: 11.16/km^{2} (28.9/sq mi)
- Time zone: UTC+10 (AEST)
  - Summer (DST): UTC+11 (AEDT)
- Postcode: 2320
- County: Durham
- Parish: Uffington
- Mean max temp: 29.6 °C (85.3 °F)
- Mean min temp: 6.1 °C (43.0 °F)
- Annual rainfall: 925.2 mm (36.43 in)
Suburbs around Glen Oak
Martins Creek, Duns Creek	Clarence Town	Clarence Town
Duns Creek	Glen Oak	Clarence Town, East Seaham
Duns Creek, Butterwick	Seaham	East Seaham

Glen Oak is a small community in the Hunter Region of New South Wales, Australia, shared between the Port Stephens and Dungog local government areas (LGA). Approximately two thirds of the suburb's 45.1 square kilometres (17.4 sq mi) is located within the Port Stephens LGA while the remaining third, which is sparsely populated, is located in Dungog Shire.

== History ==
=== Early Settlement and Development ===
Binder's Path, an early track from Paterson’s Plains (now Paterson and Woodville) to Clarence Town, traversed the land that would become Glen Oak. Named after Richard Binder, a convict settler, this path was a vital line of communication between the farms at Woodville and Clarence Town, leading to the need for a defined route. This track, now a historic fire trail, merits identification due to its significance in the early development of the area.

=== Notable Settler Families ===
The dilapidated homestead at Langlands, circa 1969.

In the early 1830s, Thomas and Mary Anne Holmes of the Oakendale estate were among the most influential settler families in the Glen Oak area. They settled on 640 acres in the district and played a significant role in the Glen Oak's development over the following century, including Thomas Holmes' contribution as a builder and road maker. He was credited with opening a stone quarry and building the first bridge over Tumbledown Creek.

Other large estates in the area included "Glen Livett", traversed by Wallaroo and Tumbledown Creeks, and "Langlands:, containing a large lagoon near the river.

On June 20, 1889, a significant event occurred when a fire broke out at the Langlands estate, owned by J.C.H. Bass. The fire, which started around 2:30 a.m., led to the total destruction of the original house and some of the furniture. An inquest by the District Coroner concluded that the fire was deliberately set, but there was insufficient evidence to identify the culprit. The estate was insured for £850. A second homestead, built sometime around 1892, fell into disrepair after the Second World War and was demolished in the 1970s.

=== 1861 Land Act and German Settlers ===
Following the 1861 Land Act, several small farms were established by settlers of German origin, including the Blum, Storck, Hinkelbein, Kuss, and Tranter families. Ambrose Stork, a notable figure among these settlers, built a mud brick house and established a vineyard and winery, contributing to the agricultural development of Glen Oak.

=== Community Infrastructure ===
During the late 19th and early 20th centuries, Glen Oak included a community hall, post office, public school, and general store. The establishment of these community infrastructures marked the growth of Glen Oak. The Glen Oak School, originating on the Oakendale estate, became a public school in 1872 and was later renamed Glen Oak School in 1889. The peak of community life was in the 1910s, with annual agricultural shows attracting large crowds. However, the school closed in 1944, reflecting a decline in population during World War II. Declining river trade affected Glen Oak, and by the 1950s, much of the village itself had been abandoned.

=== The Glen Oak School of Arts ===
The Glen Oak School of Arts, established in the late 19th century, became the focal point of social activities in the community. The earliest Minute Book (1898-1904) and other historical records provide insights into the activities and members of the society through the years. The hamlet of Glen Oak, situated in the Parish of Uffington, covered approximately 31.1 km². Early land grants in the area included those to James Hawthorn, James Holt, and Hugh Torrance. Today, very little is left to indicate that a town ever existed. However, the School of Arts hall on Clarence Town Road, built in 1899 and possibly the last community-owned hall in Australia, still stands and is used for various social activities. At the entrance to the hall are two pillars commemorating local men from the area who fought in World War I.
