= Paterson River bridge, Hinton =

Hinton Bridge
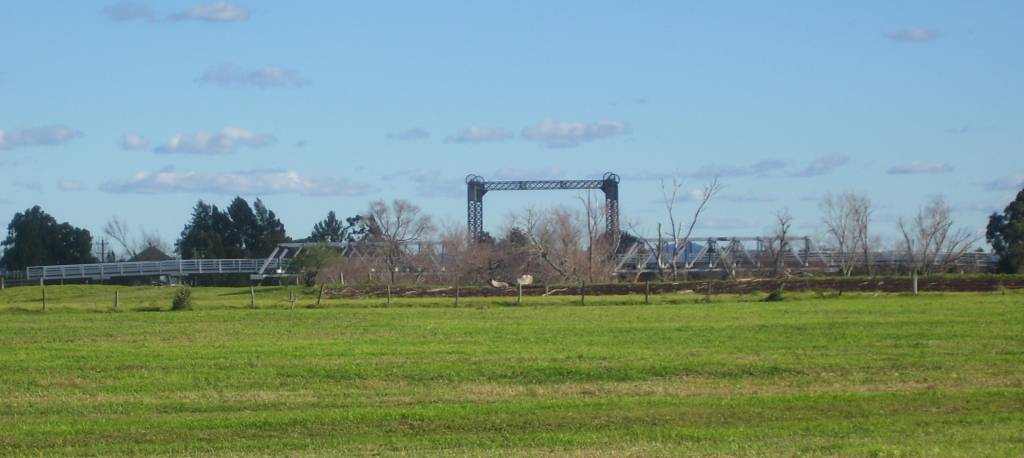
- Hinton Bridge viewed from north of Hinton, in 2007
- Coordinates: 32°42′51″S 151°38′52″E
- Carries: Hinton-Morpeth Road
- Crosses: Paterson River
- Locale: Hinton, New South Wales, Australia
- Owner: Transport for NSW

Characteristics
- Design: Allan-type truss with lift span
- Material: Timber
- Pier construction: Cast iron cylinders
- Total length: 178.6 metres (586 ft)
- Longest span: 28 metres (92 ft)
- Clearance below: 14 metres (45 ft) (bridge); 7.9 metres (26 ft) (centre) above high water

History
- Architect: Percy Allan
- Engineering design by: Ernest de Burgh
- Constructed by: S. McGill
- Fabrication by: Pope, Maher and Company; Bullivant and Co.
- Construction cost: A£9,845
- Opened: 13 February 1901
- Inaugurated: by John See, Colonial Secretary

New South Wales Heritage Register
- Official name: Hinton Bridge over Paterson River
- Type: State heritage (built)
- Designated: 20 June 2000
- Reference no.: 1470
- Type: Road Bridge
- Category: Transport – Land
- Builders: S. McGill

Location
- Interactive map of Hinton Bridge

The Hinton Bridge over Paterson River is a heritage-listed road bridge that carrier the Hinton-Morpeth Road across the Paterson River at Hinton, New South Wales, Australia. The bridge was designed by Ernest de Burgh and built in 1901. The bridge is owned by Transport for NSW. The bridge was added to the New South Wales State Heritage Register on 20 June 2000.

== History ==
=== Timber truss bridges ===
Timber truss road bridges have played a significant role in the expansion and improvement of the NSW road network. Prior to the bridges being built, river crossings were often dangerous in times of rain, which caused bulk freight movement to be prohibitively expensive for most agricultural and mining produce. Only the high priced wool clip of the time was able to carry the costs and inconvenience imposed by the generally inadequate river crossings that often existed prior to the trusses construction.

Timber truss bridges were preferred by the Public Works Department from the mid 19th to the early 20th century because they were relatively cheap to construct, and used mostly local materials. The financially troubled governments of the day applied pressure to the Public Works Department to produce as much road and bridge work for as little cost as possible, using local materials. This condition effectively prohibited the use of iron and steel, as these, prior to the construction of the steel works at Newcastle in the early 20th century, had to be imported from England.

Allan trusses were the first truly scientifically engineered timber truss bridges, and incorporate American design ideas for the first time. This is a reflection of the changing mindset of the NSW people, who were slowly accepting that American ideas could be as good as or better than European ones. The high quality and low cost of the Allan truss design entrenched the dominance of timber truss bridges for NSW roads for the next 30 years.

Percy Allan, the designer of Allan truss and other bridges, was a senior engineer of the Public Works Department, and a prominent figure in late 19th century NSW.

Timber truss bridges, and timber bridges generally were so common that NSW was known to travellers as the "timber bridge state".

=== Paterson River bridge ===
The bridge project to replace the existing steam ferry was initiated in 1898, when a contract of was let for its construction for A£9,845. A further project of 2,200 metres (110 chains) of road to connect the new bridge to the Morpeth Bridge was initiated in the same year. The contractor for the work was S. McGill, the same contractor as the Morpeth Bridge. The iron and steel work was provided by Messrs. Pope, Maher and Company, and the steel ropes for the lifting span manufactured by Messrs. Bullivant and Co.

The bridge was designed by Ernest de Burgh, Assistant Engineer for Bridges in the Public Works department, under the direction of Under-Secretary for Public Works and Commissioner for Roads Hickson. It was designed to allow for a clear opening for river traffic of 15.37 metres (50 ft 5 in) when opened, and to be able to be raised to give a headway of 7.77 metres (25 ft 6 in) above flood, or 14 metres (45 ft) above high water.

It was opened on 13 February 1901 by Colonial Secretary, John See.

The lifting span was fixed in position in 1940.

== Description ==
Hinton bridge is an Allan-type timber truss road bridge. It has two external timber truss spans, each of 28 metres (92 ft) and one internal steel truss lift span of 17.8 metres (58 ft). There are seven timber approach spans at one end and three at the other giving the bridge an overall length of 178.6 metres (586 ft).

The bridge is 14.3 metres (47 ft) above the high water line and the centre lift span previously rose another 7.9 metres (26 ft). The lifting span was fixed in position in 1940 as the need for river steamers ceased.

The internal lift span is supported by twin cast iron cylinders. The timber truss spans are supported by timber trestles. The superstructure provides a carriageway with a minimum width of 5.1m. Guard rails are of post and rail construction over the approach and timber truss spans.

It was reported to be in good condition and to be intact as at 13 September 2005.

== Heritage listing ==
Completed in 1901, Hinton Bridge is an Allan timber truss road bridge, and has a lift span which in the past accommodated river steamers that travelled the Hunter River system. Hinton is one of only three lift bridges in the Hunter region. Most of its engineering details are intact, and the bridge is in good condition. As a timber truss road bridge, it has many associational links with important historical events, trends, and people, including the expansion of the road network and economic activity throughout NSW, and Percy Allan, the designer of this type of truss. Allan trusses were third in the five-stage design evolution of NSW timber truss bridges, and were a major improvement over the McDonald trusses which preceded them. Allan trusses were 20% cheaper to build than McDonald trusses, could carry 50% more load, and were easier to maintain. The people who live in the area around the bridge value the bridge highly, and as such it has social significance. Hinton bridge is in the Hunter Region, which has 15 historic road bridges each constructed before 1905. It gains heritage significance from its proximity to the high concentration of other historic bridges. In 1998 there were 38 surviving Allan trusses in NSW of the 105 built, and 82 timber truss road bridges survive from the over 400 built. Hinton bridge is a representative example of Allan timber truss road bridges, and is assessed as being Nationally significant, primarily on the basis of its technical and historical significance.

The Hinton Bridge over Paterson River was listed on the New South Wales State Heritage Register on 20 June 2000 having satisfied the following criteria.

The place is important in demonstrating the course, or pattern, of cultural or natural history in New South Wales.

Through the bridge's association with the expansion of the NSW road network, its ability to demonstrate historically important concepts such as the gradual acceptance of NSW people of American design ideas, and its association with Percy Allan, it has historical significance.

The place is important in demonstrating aesthetic characteristics and/or a high degree of creative or technical achievement in New South Wales.

The bridge exhibits the technical excellence of its design, as all of the structural detail is clearly visible. In the context of its landscape it is visually attractive. As such, the bridge has substantial aesthetic significance.

The place has a strong or special association with a particular community or cultural group in New South Wales for social, cultural or spiritual reasons.

The bridge is highly valued by the nearby Hinton community. Timber truss bridges are prominent to road travellers, and NSW has in the past been referred to as the "timber truss bridge state". Through this, the complete set of bridges gain some social significance, as they could be said to be held in reasonable esteem by many travellers in NSW.

The place possesses uncommon, rare or endangered aspects of the cultural or natural history of New South Wales.

It is highly rare because of its lift span and age.

The place is important in demonstrating the principal characteristics of a class of cultural or natural places/environments in New South Wales.

It is representative of Allan timber truss bridges.

== See also ==
- List of bridges in Australia
