= Maitland Mercury =

Newspaper in Maitland, New South Wales

the Maitland Mercury
- Maitland Mercury masthead
- Type: Weekly newspaper
- Format: Tabloid
- Owner(s): Australian Community Media
- Founded: 7 January 1843
- Language: English
- Headquarters: Maitland, New South Wales
- Website: maitlandmercury.com.au

The Maitland Mercury is Australia's third oldest regional newspaper, preceded only by the Geelong Advertiser (estab. 1840) and the Launceston Examiner (estab. 1842). The Maitland Mercury was established in 1843 when it was called The Maitland Mercury and Hunter River General Advertiser. The Maitland Mercury is still in circulation serving the city of Maitland and the surrounding Lower Hunter Valley. It has a weekly print edition which appears on Fridays.

== History ==
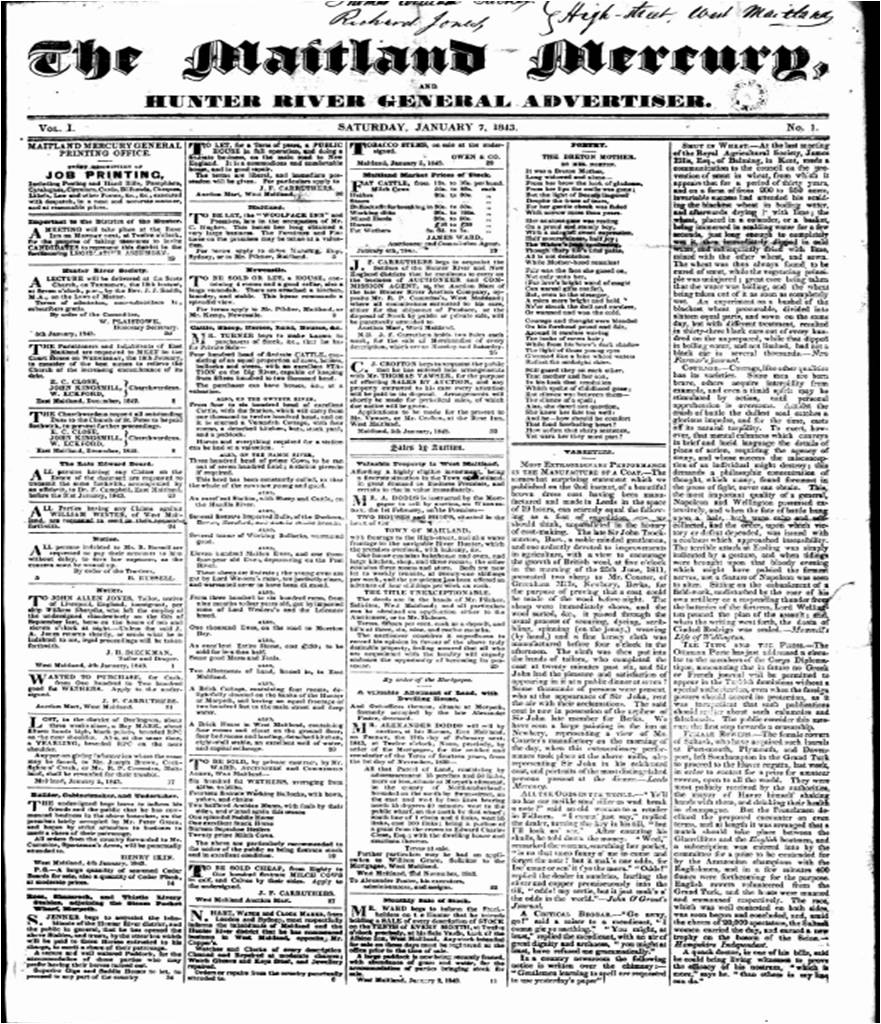
The front page of The Maitland Mercury, 7 January 1843

It was originally a weekly newspaper, founded by Richard Jones, an English migrant from Liverpool who also served as treasurer of NSW for a brief period. The first issue was published as The Maitland Mercury and Hunter River General Advertiser on 7 January 1843. It has been a daily since 1894. when it was issued under two banners as The Maitland Daily Mercury during the week and The Maitland Weekly Mercury on Saturdays. From 1870 to 1873, Margaret Falls was the proprietor. In 1939 the weekly edition was absorbed into the daily and it became known as The Maitland Mercury. It was issued simply as The Mercury from 1960 to 1973 when it reverted again to The Maitland Mercury.

Even when it was first published The Mercury was more than just a local newspaper reporting on local issues. It published national and international news, which was critical to the financial survival of the newspaper at the time, and it continues to do so.

== Digitisation ==
The paper has been digitised as part of the Australian Newspapers Digitisation Program of the National Library of Australia.

== See also ==
- List of newspapers in Australia
- List of newspapers in New South Wales
