= Stewarts Brook =

Coordinates: 31°59′S 151°10′E

Stewarts Brook North Arm of Stewarts Brook

Location
- Country: Australia
- State: New South Wales
- Region: Sydney Basin (IBRA), Upper Hunter
- Local government area: Upper Hunter

Physical characteristics
- Source: Mount Barrington, Mount Royal Range
  - location: Barrington Tops National Park
  - elevation: 1,100 m (3,600 ft)
- Mouth: confluence with the Hunter River
  - location: northeast of Belltrees
  - elevation: 313 m (1,027 ft)
- Length: 33 km (21 mi)

Basin features
- River system: Hunter River catchment
- Tributaries
  - left: Carters Brook (New South Wales), Cadiangullong Creek, Spring Gully (Stewarts Brook)
- National park: Barrington Tops NP

Stewarts Brook, a perennial stream of the Hunter River catchment, is located in the Hunter region of New South Wales, Australia.

== Course ==
Officially designated as a river, the Stewarts Brook rises below Mount Barrington on the western slopes of Mount Royal Range. The river flows generally west northwest, joined by three minor tributaries, before reaching its confluence with the Hunter River northeast of the locality of Belltrees, east of Scone. Stewarts Brook descends 786 metres (2,579 ft) over its 33 kilometres (21 mi) course.

== See also ==
- List of rivers of Australia
- List of rivers of New South Wales (L-Z)
- Rivers of New South Wales
