= Moonan Brook =

Coordinates: 31°58′S 151°21′E

Moonan Brook Bells Creek

Location
- Country: Australia
- State: New South Wales
- Region: Sydney Basin (IBRA), Upper Hunter
- Local government area: Upper Hunter

Physical characteristics
- Source: Mount Barrington, Mount Royal Range
  - location: Barrington Tops National Park
  - elevation: 1,350 m (4,430 ft)
- Mouth: confluence with the Hunter River
  - location: at Moonan Flat
  - elevation: 410 m (1,350 ft)
- Length: 26 km (16 mi)

Basin features
- River system: Hunter River catchment
- National park: Barrington Tops NP

Moonan Brook, a mostly perennial stream of the Hunter River catchment, is located in the Hunter region of New South Wales, Australia.

== Course ==
Officially designated as a river, the Moonan Brook rises below Mount Barrington on the western slopes of Mount Royal Range. The river flows generally west northwest before reaching its confluence with the Hunter River near the locality of Moonan Flat, east of Scone. Moonan Brook descends 943 metres (3,094 ft) over its 26 kilometres (16 mi) course.

== See also ==
- List of rivers of Australia
- List of rivers of New South Wales (L-Z)
- Rivers of New South Wales
