= Barrington Tops State Conservation Area =

Protected area in New South Wales, Australia

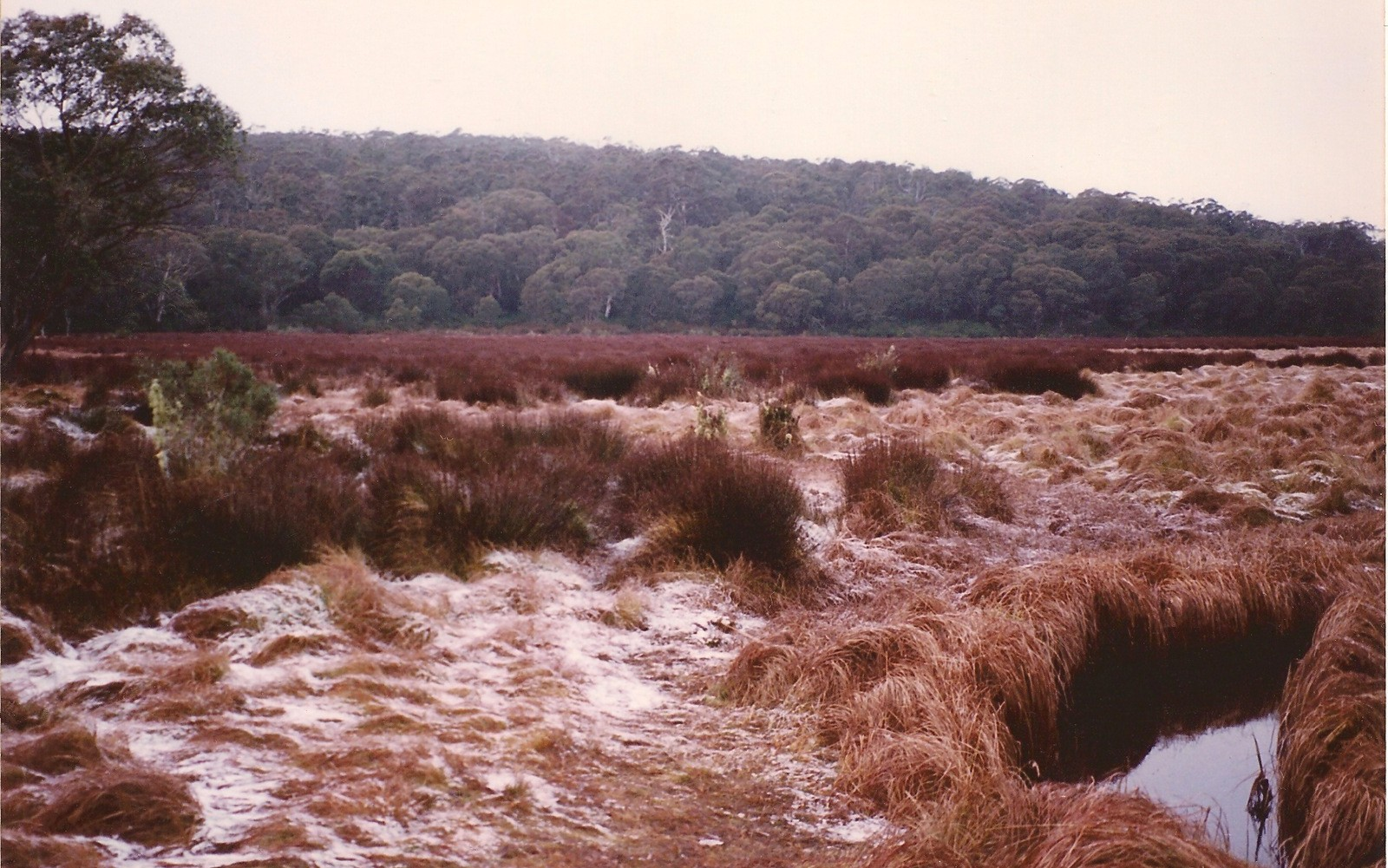
- Mount Polblue and Polblue Swamp

Highest point
- Coordinates: 31°57.449′S 151°25.704′E

Geography
- Location: Barrington Tops, Australia
- Country: Australia
- Parent range: Mount Royal Range

Barrington Tops State Conservation Area is a protected area in the Australian state of New South Wales in the Barrington Tops region. It was previously known as the Polblue and Barrington Tops Crown Reserves. The conservation area was created in January 2003. It covers an area of 8,446 hectares. Unlike the adjacent national park mining is allowed in a State Conservation Area. Zircon, sapphire and rubies were formed from the nearby Barrington Volcano in the Eocene epoch.

Gondwana Rainforests, extend to Queensland in the southeast to the Barrington Tops northwest of Newcastle. 270 endangered plant and animal species can be found in it.
