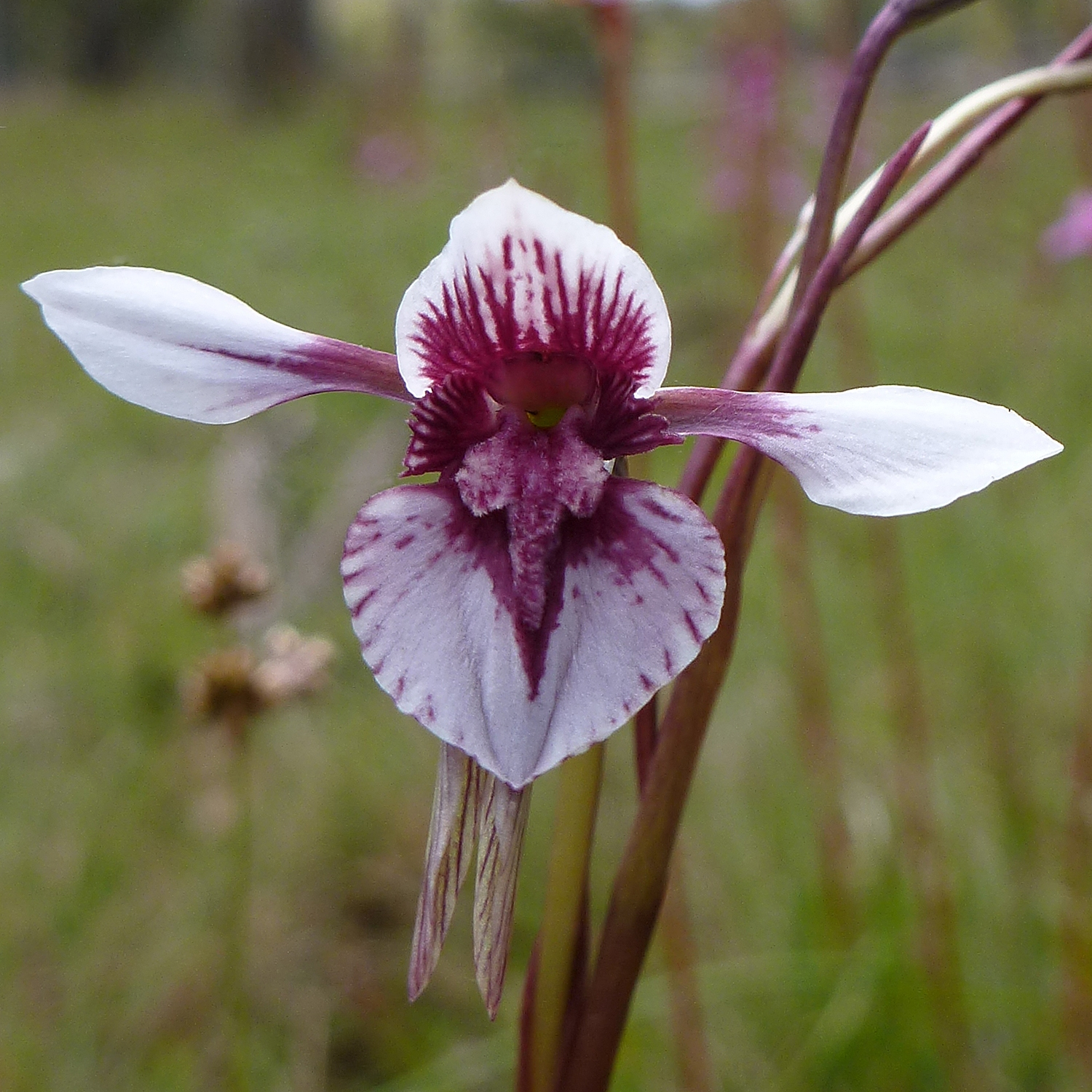
- In Barrington Tops National Park

Conservation status
- Vulnerable (EPBC Act)

Scientific classification
- Kingdom: Plantae
- Clade: Embryophytes
- Clade: Tracheophytes
- Clade: Angiosperms
- Clade: Monocots
- Order: Asparagales
- Family: Orchidaceae
- Subfamily: Orchidoideae
- Tribe: Diurideae
- Genus: Diuris
- Species: D. venosa

Binomial name
- Diuris venosa Rupp

= Diuris venosa =

Veined doubletail

Species of orchid

Diuris venosa, commonly known as veined doubletail is a species of orchid which is endemic to New South Wales. It has a few thin, erect leaves and up to four white to lilac-coloured flowers with deep red to purple blotches and lines.

== Description ==
Diuris venosa is a tuberous, perennial, terrestrial herb, with three to five erect, thread-like leaves 5–12 cm (2–5 in) long and 1–3 mm (0.04–0.1 in) wide.

There are up to four flowers arranged on a raceme 10–40 cm (4–20 in) high, each flower about 25 mm (1 in) wide. The flowers are white to lilac-coloured with many purple lines and blotches. The dorsal sepal is broadly egg-shaped, 9–12 mm (0.4–0.5 in) long, 4–9 mm (0.2–0.4 in) wide and forms a hood over the column. The lateral sepals are linear to lance-shaped, 11–18 mm (0.4–0.7 in) long, 2–3.5 mm (0.08–0.1 in) wide and hang vertically below the flower. The petals are narrow egg-shaped, 3–10 mm (0.1–0.4 in) long, 3–6 mm (0.1–0.2 in) wide spreading more or less horizontally and resemble the shape of cow's ears. The labellum is 10–13 mm (0.4–0.5 in) long and is divided into three lobes. The lateral lobes are linear to wedge-shaped, 3–4 mm (0.1–0.2 in) long, 1–3 mm (0.04–0.1 in) wide with a wavy edge. The medial lobe is a broad egg-shape to almost circular when flattened, 6–11 mm (0.2–0.4 in) wide with a callus 5–6.5 mm (0.2–0.3 in) long.

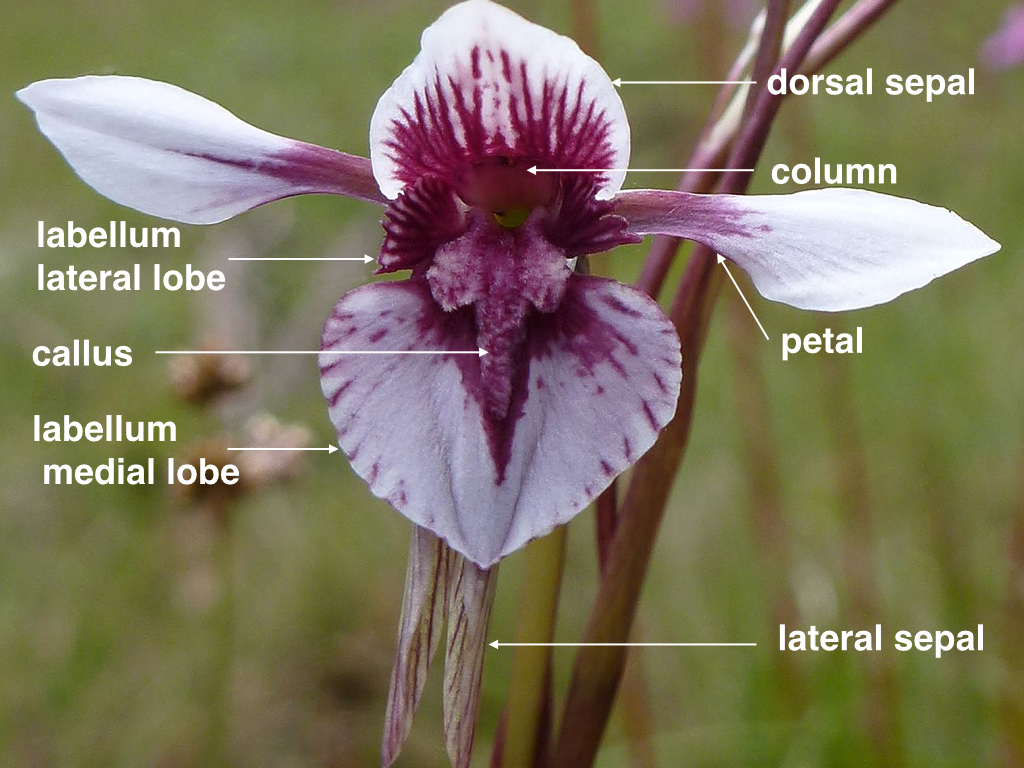
Labelled image

== Taxonomy and naming ==
Diuris venosa was first formally described in 1926 by Herman Rupp and the description was published in the journal, Victorian Naturalist. The specific epithet (venosa) is derived from a Latin word meaning "veiny".

== Distribution and habitat ==
This orchid is only found in New South Wales, in the Barrington Tops and New England National Parks, where it grows in swampy, grassy areas.

== Conservation ==
Diuris venosa is listed as "Vulnerable" (VU) under the Australian Government Environment Protection and Biodiversity Conservation Act 1999 (EPBC Act). The threats to its survival include invasion by introduced weeds, particularly English broom (Cytisus scoparius), illegal removal of plants, and predation by feral pigs (Sus scrofa).
