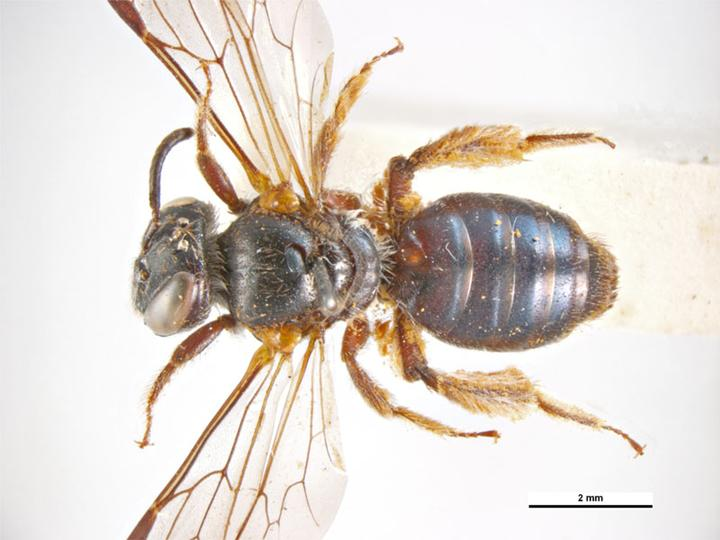
- Female

Scientific classification
- Kingdom: Animalia
- Phylum: Arthropoda
- Clade: Pancrustacea
- Class: Insecta
- Order: Hymenoptera
- Family: Colletidae
- Genus: Leioproctus
- Species: L. launcestonensis

Binomial name
- Leioproctus launcestonensis (Cockerell, 1914)

Synonyms
- Paracolletes launcestonensis Cockerell, 1914

= Leioproctus launcestonensis =

Species of bee

Leioproctus launcestonensis, or Leioproctus (Leioproctus) launcestonensis, is a species of bee in the family Colletidae and subfamily Colletinae. It is endemic to Australia. It was described by British-American entomologist Theodore Dru Alison Cockerell in 1914.

== Description ==
Female body length is about 8 mm. Colouration is mainly black, the abdomen "very dark greenish", with white to brownish hair.

== Distribution and habitat ==
The species occurs in eastern Australia. The type locality is Launceston, Tasmania.

== Behaviour ==
The adults are flying mellivores. Flowering plants visited by the bees include Prostanthera lasianthos, Leptospermum ericoides and Bursaria spinosa, as well as Eucalyptus species.

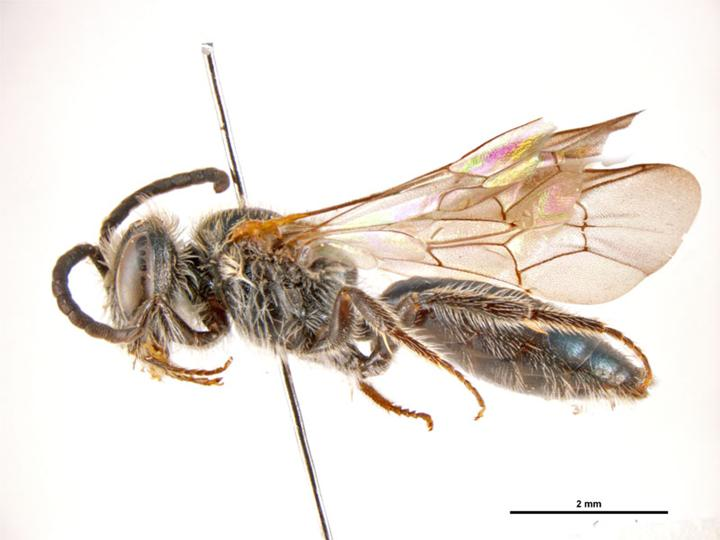
Male
