= Pterostylis riparia =

Streamside greenhood

Conservation status
- Vulnerable (EPBC Act)

Scientific classification
- Kingdom: Plantae
- Clade: Tracheophytes
- Clade: Angiosperms
- Clade: Monocots
- Order: Asparagales
- Family: Orchidaceae
- Subfamily: Orchidoideae
- Tribe: Cranichideae
- Genus: Pterostylis
- Species: P. riparia

Binomial name
- Pterostylis riparia D.L.Jones

Species of orchid

Pterostylis riparia, commonly known as the streamside greenhood, is a plant in the orchid family Orchidaceae and is endemic to New South Wales. Both flowering and non-flowering plants have a rosette of dark green, fleshy leaves. Flowering plants have a single, relatively large green, white and reddish-brown flower with a deeply notched sinus between hairy lateral sepals.

== Description ==
Pterostylis riparia, is a terrestrial, perennial, deciduous, herb with an underground tuber. Plants have a rosette of three or four dark green, fleshy leaves, each leaf 25–70 mm (1–3 in) long and 10–25 mm (0.4–1 in) wide. Flowering plants have a single green, white and reddish-brown flower 28–35 mm (1.1–1.4 in) long and 12–15 mm (0.5–0.6 in) wide on a stalk 50–200 mm (2–8 in) high. The dorsal sepal and petals are joined to form a hood called the "galea" over the column with the dorsal sepal and petals a similar length and ending in a sharp point. There is a wide gap between the galea and the lateral sepals which are hairy and have erect, narrow tips 15–18 mm (0.6–0.7 in) long. The sinus between the lateral sepals is flat and hairy with a deep notch in the centre. The labellum is 18–21 mm (0.7–0.8 in) long, about 4 mm (0.2 in) wide and dark brown, protruding slightly above the sinus. Flowering occurs in October and November.

== Taxonomy and naming ==
Pterostylis riparia was first formally described in 2006 by David Jones from a specimen collected near Omadale Brook in the Barrington Tops National Park and the description was published in Australian Orchid Research. The specific epithet is derived from the Latin riparius meaning 'of stream banks'.

== Distribution and habitat ==
The streamside greenhood grows on moist forest slopes and is restricted to the Barrington Tops National Park.

== Conservation status ==
This greenhood is listed as "vulnerable" under the Australian Government Environment Protection and Biodiversity Conservation Act 1999 and the New South Wales Government Biodiversity Conservation Act 2016.
