= Pterostylis subtilis =

Thin mountain greenhood

Scientific classification
- Kingdom: Plantae
- Clade: Tracheophytes
- Clade: Angiosperms
- Clade: Monocots
- Order: Asparagales
- Family: Orchidaceae
- Subfamily: Orchidoideae
- Tribe: Cranichideae
- Genus: Pterostylis
- Species: P. subtilis

Binomial name
- Pterostylis subtilis D.L.Jones

Species of orchid

Pterostylis subtilis, commonly known as the thin mountain greenhood, is a species of orchid endemic to New South Wales. It has a rosette of leaves and when flowering a single translucent white flower with dark green lines, a narrow, deeply notched sinus between the lateral sepals and a curved, protruding labellum.

== Description ==
Pterostylis subtilis is a terrestrial, perennial, deciduous, herb with an underground tuber and a rosette of fleshy leaves lying flat on the ground. Each leaf is 30–50 mm (1–2 in) long and 15–25 mm (0.6–1 in) wide. When flowering, there is a single white flower with dark green lines, 35–45 mm (1–2 in) long and 15–20 mm (0.6–0.8 in) wide which is borne on a flowering spike 120–250 mm (5–10 in) high. The dorsal sepal and petals are fused to form a hood or "galea" over the column, the dorsal sepal slightly longer than the petals and all sharply pointed. There is a narrow gap at each side of the flower between the petals and lateral sepals. The lateral sepals are erect with a tapering tip 15–20 mm (0.6–0.8 in) long and there is a deep, narrow sinus between them. The labellum is 16–20 mm (0.6–0.8 in) long, about 3 mm (0.1 in) wide, blunt and curved, protruding above the sinus. Flowering occurs in December and January.

== Taxonomy and naming ==
Pterostylis subtilis was first described in 2006 by David Jones and the description was published in Australian Orchid Research from a specimen collected in the Barrington Tops National Park. The specific epithet (subtilis) is a Latin word meaning "thin", "fine", "slender" or "acute ".

== Distribution and habitat ==
The thin mountain greenhood grows with grasses on sheltered forest slopes in the Barrington Tops National Park.
