= Careys Peak =

Mountain in Australia

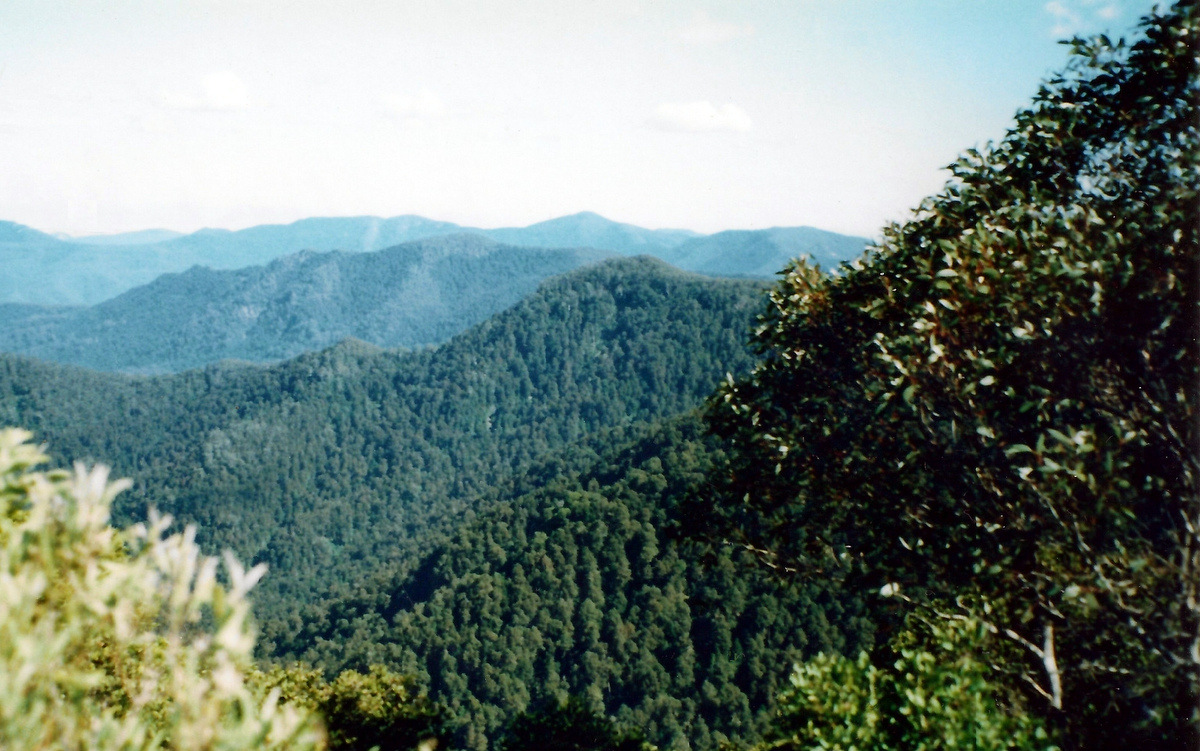
- View from Careys Peak

Highest point
- Elevation: 1,544 m (5,066 ft)
- Coordinates: 32°03.041′S 151°27.558′E

Geography
- Location within New South Wales
- Location: Barrington Tops National Park, New South Wales, Australia
- Parent range: Williams Range, Mount Royal Range

Geology
- Rock age: Eocene
- Mountain type: Alkali Gabbro

Careys Peak is a peak in the Williams Range, part of the Mount Royal Range, located in the Upper Hunter region of New South Wales, Australia. At 1,544 metres (5,066 ft) above sea level, it is one of the higher points in Barrington Tops National Park, some 200 kilometres (120 mi) north of Sydney. The peak is at the edge of the Barrington Tops plateau, within the declared wilderness of the World Heritage Gondwana Rainforests of Australia.

Wilderness streams, such as the Allyn River and Williams River rise nearby. On a clear day, the higher peaks of the Blue Mountains may be seen. And looking south east, the sands of Stockton Beach on the coast may be viewed. The scenic appeal of the area is well regarded. Particularly the large dark stands of rainforest and snow gum wilderness. Careys Peak is a popular camping and bushwalking destination. Many years ago, a skiing slope was cleared behind Careys Peak. It has since disappeared in natural bush re-growth.

== Name ==
Carey’s Peak is named after a local drover. In 1839, 500 cattle were herded to Barrington Tops during a drought, but it snowed for 21 days that winter. All of the cattle died and the drover’s tents were blown away, so Carey suggested using the cattle hides to build a shelter.

== Geology ==
The geology of the area includes Alkali Gabbro, a type of igneous rock. Careys Peak was a vent of the Barrington Volcano. During the Eocene period, a large basalt flow covered most of the nearby plateau. Below are older Permian Granodiorites and Devonian-Carboniferous sedimentary rocks, such as mudstones, siltstones, minor conglomerates and limestones.

== Flora ==
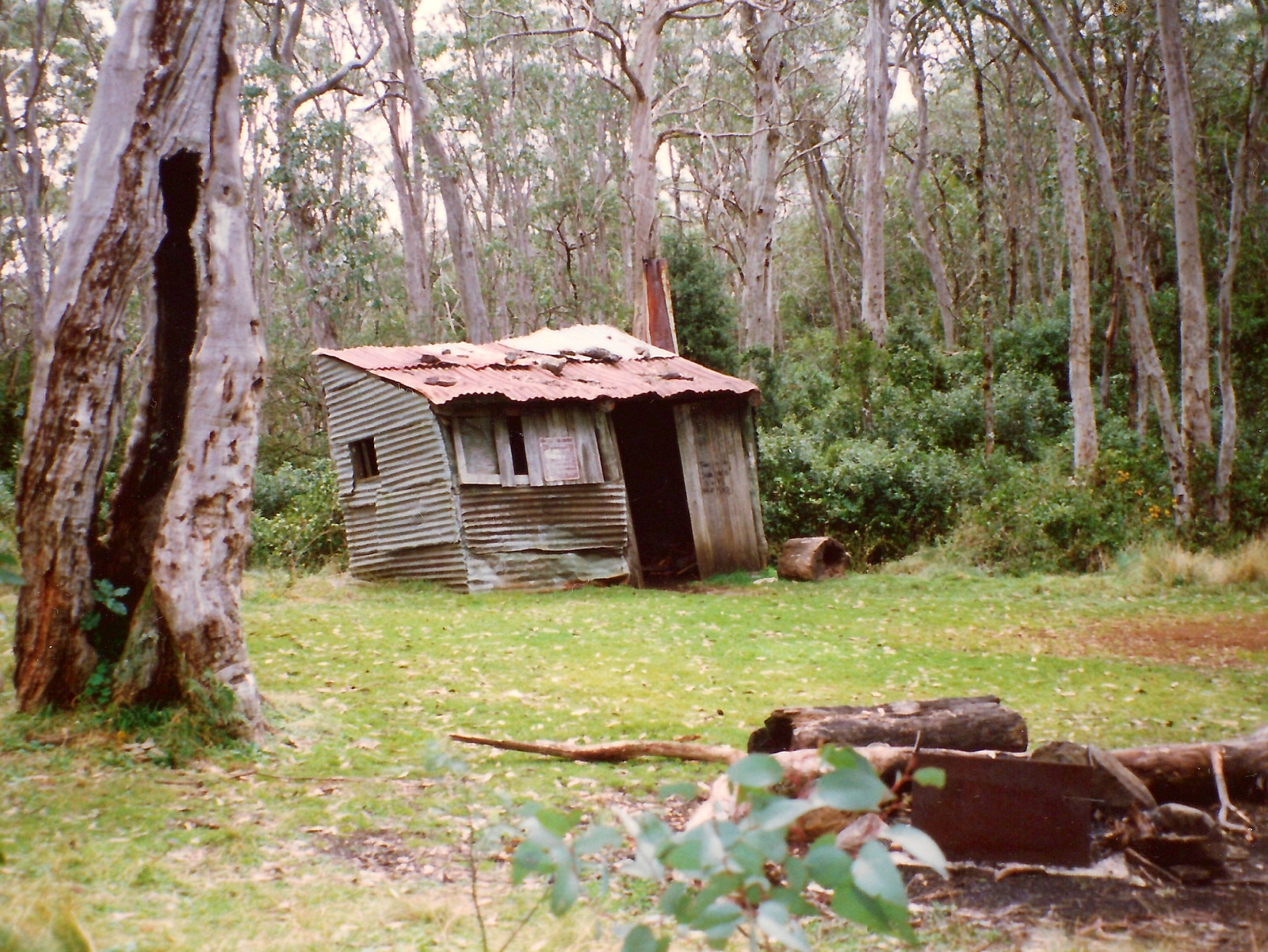
campsite and the historic 1934 hut, with snow gums at Careys Peak

The surrounding area is heavily forested. Sub alpine woodland grows on the plateau. On the escarpment, Cool temperate rainforest is dominated by the Antarctic beech. Other interesting plants nearby include the snow gum, southern sassafras and broad-leaved pepperbush. A two pronged landslip occurred in the rainforest at Careys Peak in 1978. This area is now slowly being naturally re-vegetated, initially by non-rainforest species. It is expected to return to the original Antarctic beech rainforest.

== Fauna ==
Animals in the area include wombats, eastern quoll, pademelons, eastern grey kangaroos and swamp wallabies. Lyrebirds may be seen in the undergrowth, and yellow-tailed black cockatoos are common overhead.

== See also ==
- List of mountains of Australia § New South Wales
