= Polblue =

Mountain in New South Wales, Australia

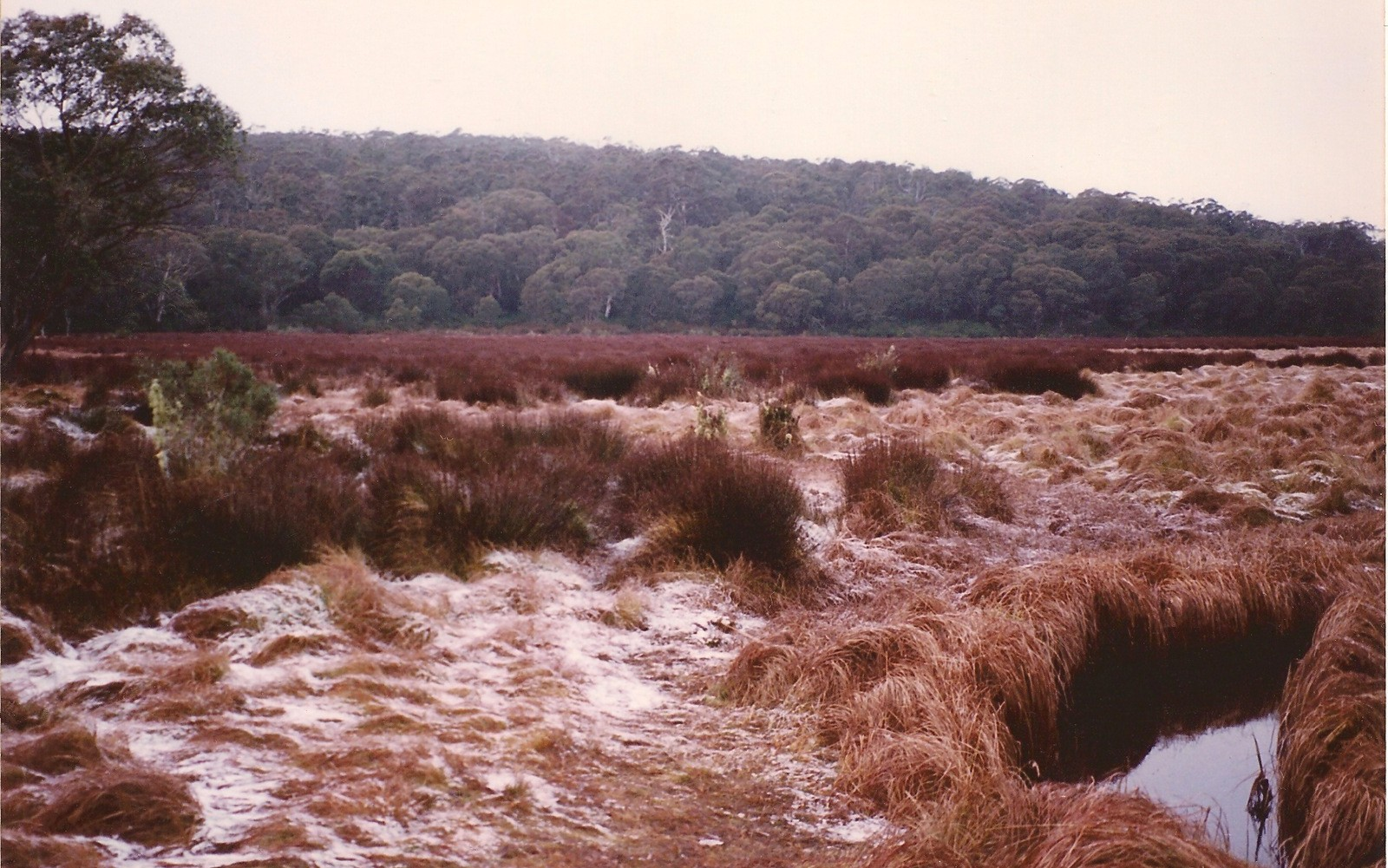
- Polblue and Polblue Swamp

Highest point
- Elevation: 1,575 m (5,167 ft)
- Coordinates: 31°58′S 151°27′E

Geography
- Location: Barrington Tops National Park, New South Wales, Australia
- Country: Australia
- Parent range: Mount Royal Range

Geology
- Rock age: Eocene

Polblue is a mountain on the Barrington Tops plateau, located in the Mid-Coast Council within New South Wales, Australia.

At 1,575 metres (5,167 ft) above sea level, Polblue is the second highest point in the area after Brumlow Top. The surrounding area is covered by sub alpine snow gum woodland and high altitude swamps. Nearby is a popular camping ground and bushwalking trails contained with the Barrington Tops National Park.

== See also ==
- List of mountains in Australia § New South Wales
