= Prospero (mountain) =

Mountain in New South Wales, Australia

Highest point
- Elevation: 1,186 metres (3,891 ft)
- Coordinates: 31°55′42″S 151°19′52″E

Geography
- Location: Hunter Region, Australia
- Country: Australia
- State: New South Wales
- Parent range: Mount Royal Range

Climbing
- Easiest route: Southern Spur from Barrington Tops Forest Road

Prospero or Prospero Mountain is a prominent peak in the Mount Royal Range in New South Wales, Australia. The peak is marked by a Trig station, which was severely damaged in a storm in 2015.
