= 1981 Barrington Tops Cessna 210 disappearance =

Aircraft disappearance

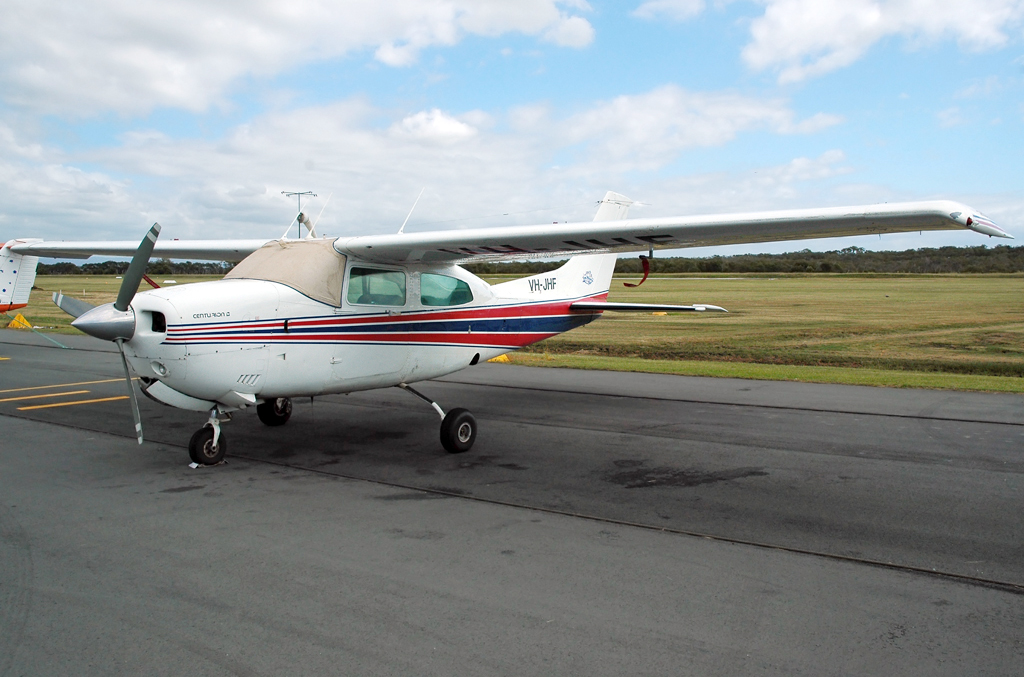
- A Cessna 210 Centurion, similar to the aircraft involved in the accident

Accident
- Date: 9 August 1981
- Summary: Aircraft crashed in an unknown location following probable instrument failure, turbulence and icing.
- Site: Barrington Tops; 32°7.6′0″S 151°46′0″E

Aircraft
- Aircraft type: Cessna 210
- Operator: Colville Aviation Services
- Registration: VH-MDX
- Flight origin: Whitsunday Coast Airport
- Stopover: Gold Coast Airport
- Destination: Bankstown Airport
- Occupants: 5
- Passengers: 4
- Crew: 1
- Fatalities: 5 (presumed)
- Survivors: 0 (presumed)

On 9 August 1981, a Cessna 210 flying from Whitsunday Coast Airport to Bankstown Airport via Gold Coast Airport lost contact after flying into adverse weather. The last known contact with the aircraft was in the Barrington Tops area. Nothing further was heard and no trace of the aircraft or its occupants has so far been found despite extensive searches.

== Background ==
VH-MDX, a Cessna 210, was chartered by four Sydney workmates for a flight back from the Whitsunday Coast Airport on Sunday 9 August 1981. The men had been sailing in the Whitsunday Passage. MDX stopped to refuel at Gold Coast Airport near Coolangatta and took off again at 5:02 p.m. The pilot had submitted a flight plan following the coast to Taree thence inland via Craven and Singleton to Bankstown, a suburb of Sydney.

== Disappearance ==
Shortly after passing waypoint CRAVN (32°7.6′0″S 151°46′0″E), the pilot reported excessive turbulence and downdraft, and that the aircraft's artificial horizon and gyroscopic direction indicator had failed. At that time, the aircraft was identified by radar to be 45 nmi (52 mi; 83 km) from RAAF Base Williamtown near the Barrington Tops, or about 40 km (22 nmi; 25 mi) north-west of its planned track. The aircraft's subsequent course is not clear, but the pilot reported ice accumulation and difficulty in gaining altitude. His final transmission at 19:39 EST indicated that he was at 5,000 feet (1,500 m).

== Searches ==
There have been many air-based and ground-based searches since the disappearance. Technologies employed include satellite imagery, aerial photography, magnetometry and chemical sampling of water downstream from the search area.
