= Brumlow Top =

Mountain in New South Wales, Australia

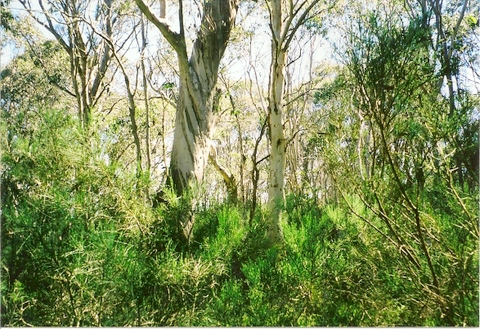
- The summit of Brumlow Top, with snow gums

Highest point
- Elevation: 1,586 m (5,203 ft)
- Coordinates: 32°00′S 151°27′E

Geography
- Location: Barrington Tops National Park, New South Wales, Australia
- Country: Australia
- State: New South Wales
- Parent range: Mount Royal Range

Geology
- Rock age: Eocene

Brumlow Top is a mountain on the Barrington Tops plateau, in the Mid-Coast Council in New South Wales, Australia.

At 1,586 m (5,203 ft) above sea level, it is the highest point in northern New South Wales and the highest volcano in mainland Australia. The surrounding area is covered by sub alpine snow gum woodland and high altitude swamps and is contained with the Barrington Tops National Park.

== See also ==
- List of mountains in Australia § New South Wales
