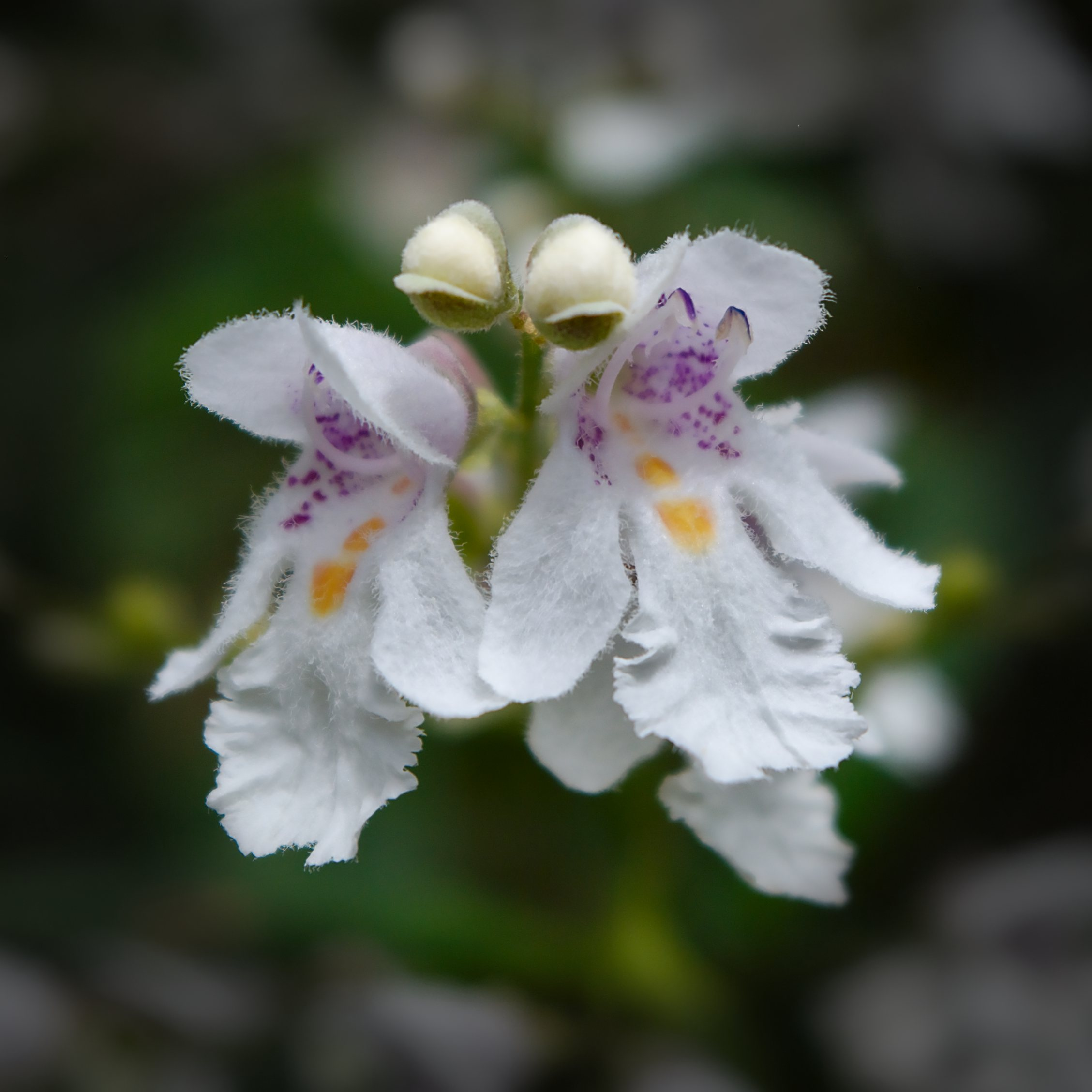
- Flowers of Prostanthera lasianthos

Scientific classification
- Kingdom: Plantae
- Clade: Tracheophytes
- Clade: Angiosperms
- Clade: Eudicots
- Clade: Asterids
- Order: Lamiales
- Family: Lamiaceae
- Genus: Prostanthera
- Species: P. lasianthos

Binomial name
- Prostanthera lasianthos Labill.
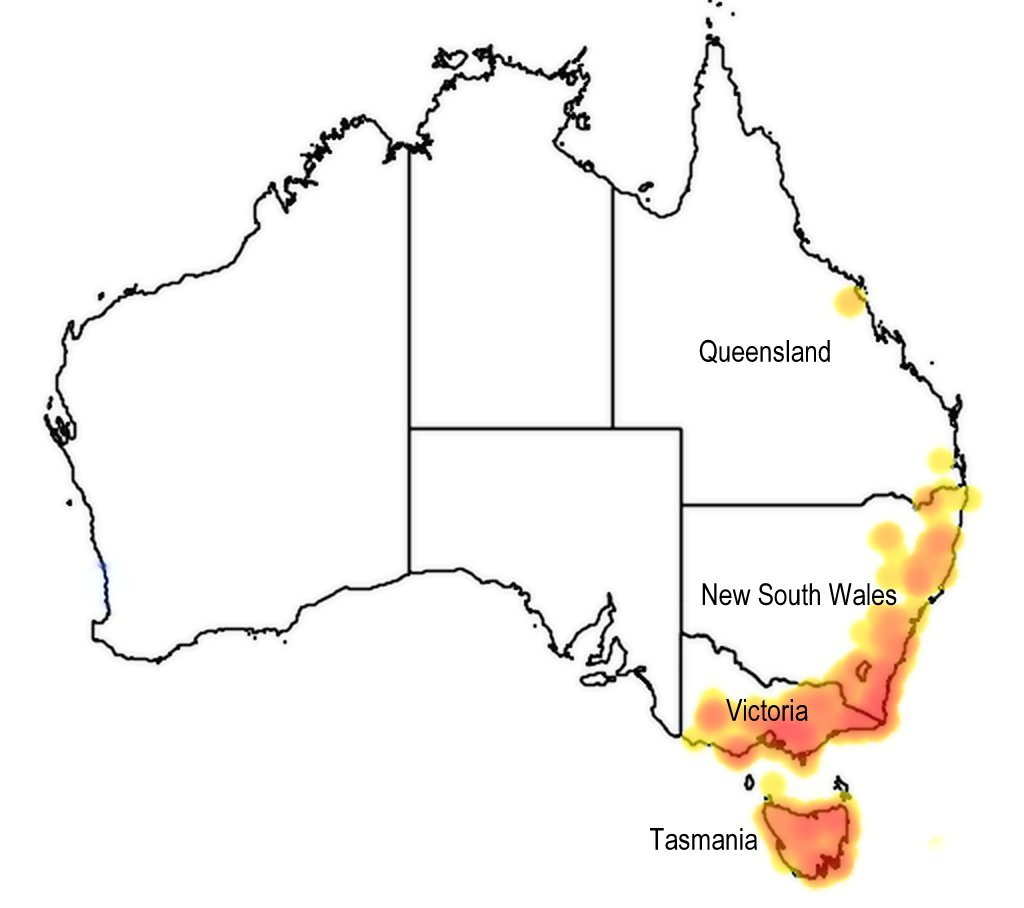

= Prostanthera lasianthos =

Victorian Christmas bush

Species of tree

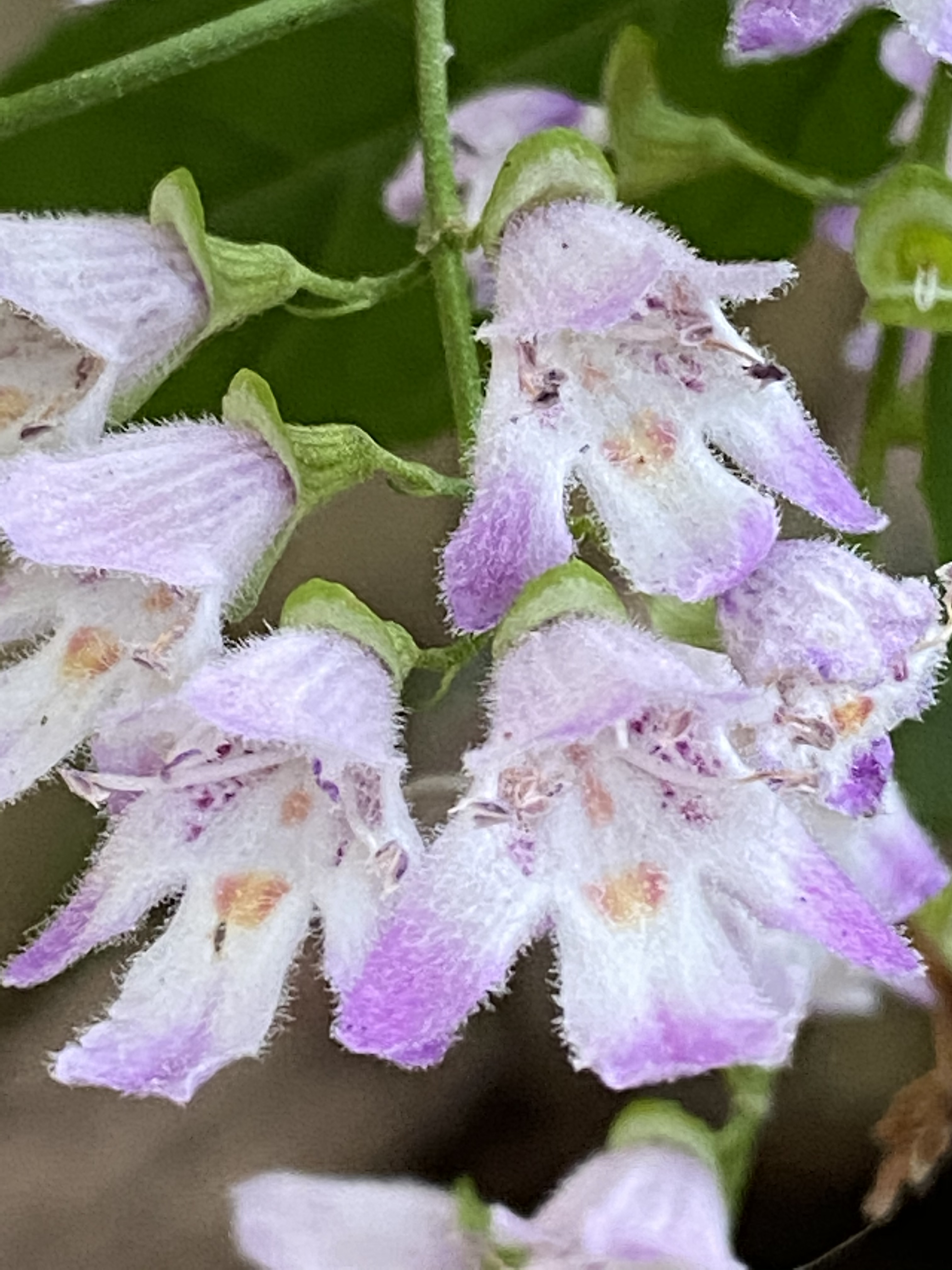
Pink form

Prostanthera lasianthos, commonly known as the Victorian Christmas bush or coranderrk , is a large shrub or small tree of the mint family, Lamiaceae, which is native to Queensland, New South Wales, Victoria and Tasmania in Australia. It grows up to 10 m (35 ft) high but is usually much less and is found in wet sclerophyll forests, often beside creeks. Its flowers, which appear in profuse sprays, are about 2 cm long and white or pale lilac, with purple and orange blotches in the throat. They appear in late spring and summer, and specifically around Christmas time in Victoria. The fragrant, toothed leaves are 4 to 12 cm (sometimes 15 cm) long and about 1.5 cm wide.

== Description ==
Prostanthera lasianthos is the largest member of the mint bush genus Prostanthera. Highly variable in habit, it ranges from a 10-metre-high (30 ft) tree in sheltered forest to a 2-metre-high (7 ft) shrub in exposed montane areas. Arranged oppositely (arising in pairs) along the stems on 0.6–1 cm long petioles, the dark green lanceolate to ovate leaves are 4 to 12 cm (sometimes 15 cm ) long and about 1.0-3.2 cm wide and taper to an acute apex. The leaf undersurface is paler. The flowers appear anywhere from November to March, and are arranged in a terminal botryoid, branched-botryoid or panicle. Mauve-flowered shrubs are often encountered at higher altitudes. Only the brown dried bracts at the flower base persist after fruiting. During dry periods this species may wilt, with the leaves rolling in to form loose tubes, reviving rapidly to erect, open leaves after rain. Having a fragrance akin to honey, the flower is composed of a 4–5 mm long calyx with a 2–3 mm long calyx tube. The white to pale mauve corolla is 10–15 mm long, and has purple spots in its throat.

== Taxonomy ==
French naturalist Jacques Labillardière described the Victorian Christmas bush in volume 2 of his Novae Hollandiae Plantarum Specimen in 1806, from a specimen collected in Van Diemens Land (Tasmania). The specific epithet is derived from the Greek words lasios "hairy" and anthos "flower". It is the type species within the genus Prostanthera. It is most closely related to P. tallowa. The mint bush genus belongs to the family Lamiaceae, which also contains the true mint species and other familiar aromatic kitchen herbs.

A number of variants have been identified over the years with uncertain taxonomic status:

- P. lasianthos var. subcoriacea, originally discovered in the Grampians in Victoria. It grows to 1.5-2.5 m high by 2–3 m across, with leathery leaves with serrate margins, and white to mauve flowers.
- Prostanthera sp. Bald Mountain (also included in what is referred to as the P. lasianthos Girraween/Polblue variant)
- Prostanthera sp. Point Lookout (also known as P. lasianthos New England smooth-leaved variant)
- Prostanthera sp. Mt Kaputar (formerly included in the P. lasianthos var. subcoriacea variant)
- Prostanthera sp. Schofields Gap (also included in what is referred to as the P. lasianthos Girraween/Polblue variant)
- Prostanthera sp. Wollomombi Gorge (also included in what is referred to as P. lasianthos Rheophytic variant)

== Distribution and habitat ==
P. lasianthos is found from Queensland to Tasmania. It occurs in a wide range of habitat, from riparian (river bank) habitats in wet forest to dry subalpine areas. In the Central Coast and Central Tablelands regions of New South Wales it grows in rainforest with such species as yellow sassafras (Doryphora sassafras) and coachwood (Ceratopetalum apetalum), in wet sclerophyll forest with cedar wattle (Acacia elata), brown barrel (Eucalyptus fastigata), and in dry sclerophyll forest with such species as forest red gum (Eucalyptus tereticornis) and river oak (Casuarina cunninghamiana).

== Ecology ==
Structurally, the flower of P. lasianthos is thought to be designed to attract insects as it has a white to mauve corolla, shallow and wide floral tube, and a large abaxial lobe. However, pollinators of mint bushes in general are poorly known. Birds have been recorded visiting the flowers.

== Cultivation ==
A fast growing plant, Prostanthera lasianthos adapts to diverse conditions in the garden, being at home in light or heavy soils and in sunny or shaded positions, even heavy shade. Prostanthera lasianthos is moderately frost-hardy and can withstand some snowfall. It can be pruned into different shapes and old plants can be rejuvenated this way; plants that are not pruned can otherwise become top-heavy. Flowering occurs in November in the Canberra region—earlier than in Victoria. Suckering has been observed. It can be propagated by seeds or taking cuttings of firm young growth. Seed stored for longer than three months at room temperature often fails to germinate.

Cultivars include 'Kallista Pink', a tall pink-flowering form that flowers profusely, and 'Mint Ice', a form with variegated foliage, both from the Dandenong Ranges in Victoria. Another tall cultivar, 'Liffey Falls' has lilac flowers.

Further images

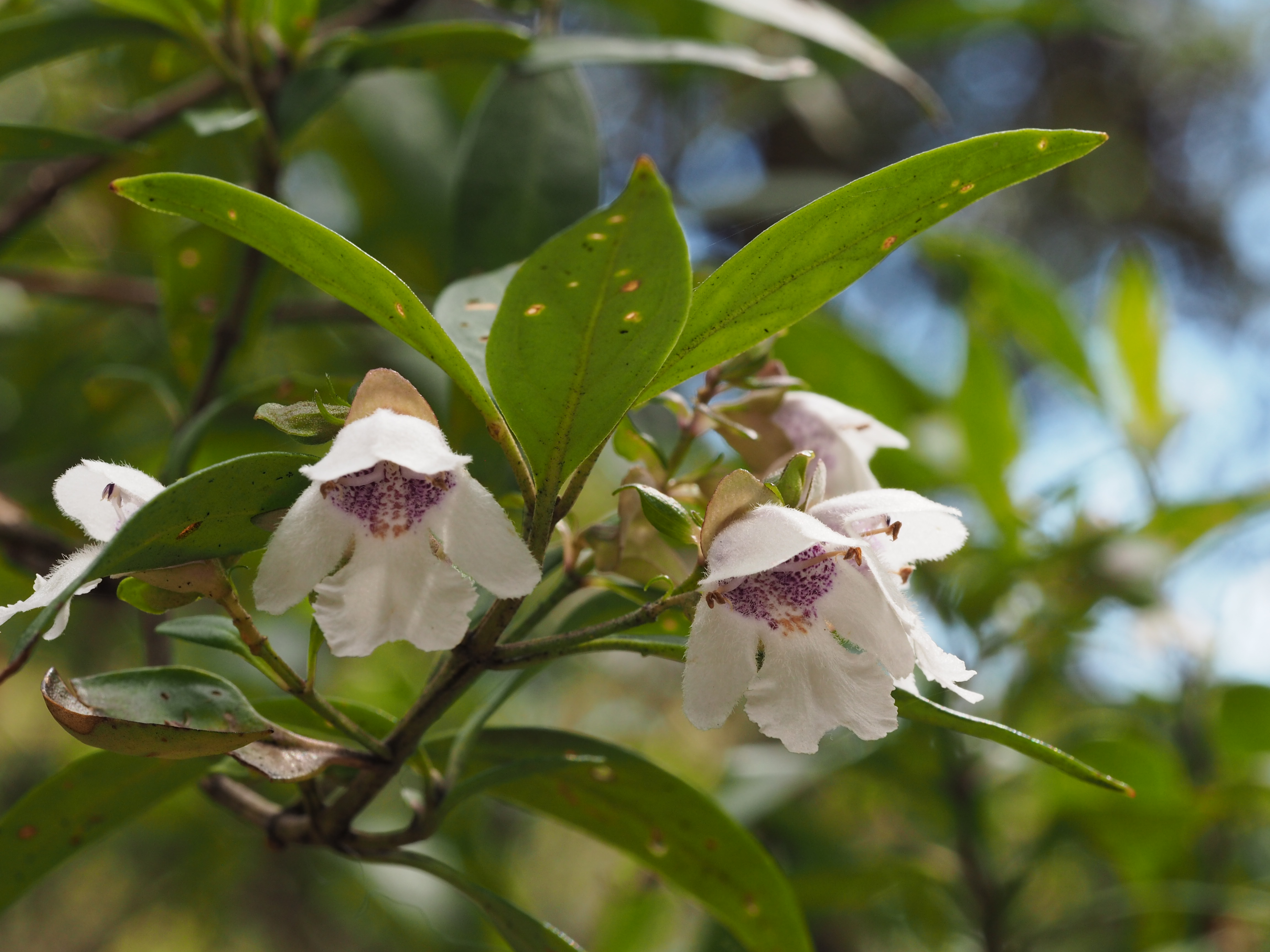
P. lasianthos sp. 'Point Lookout', New England National Park

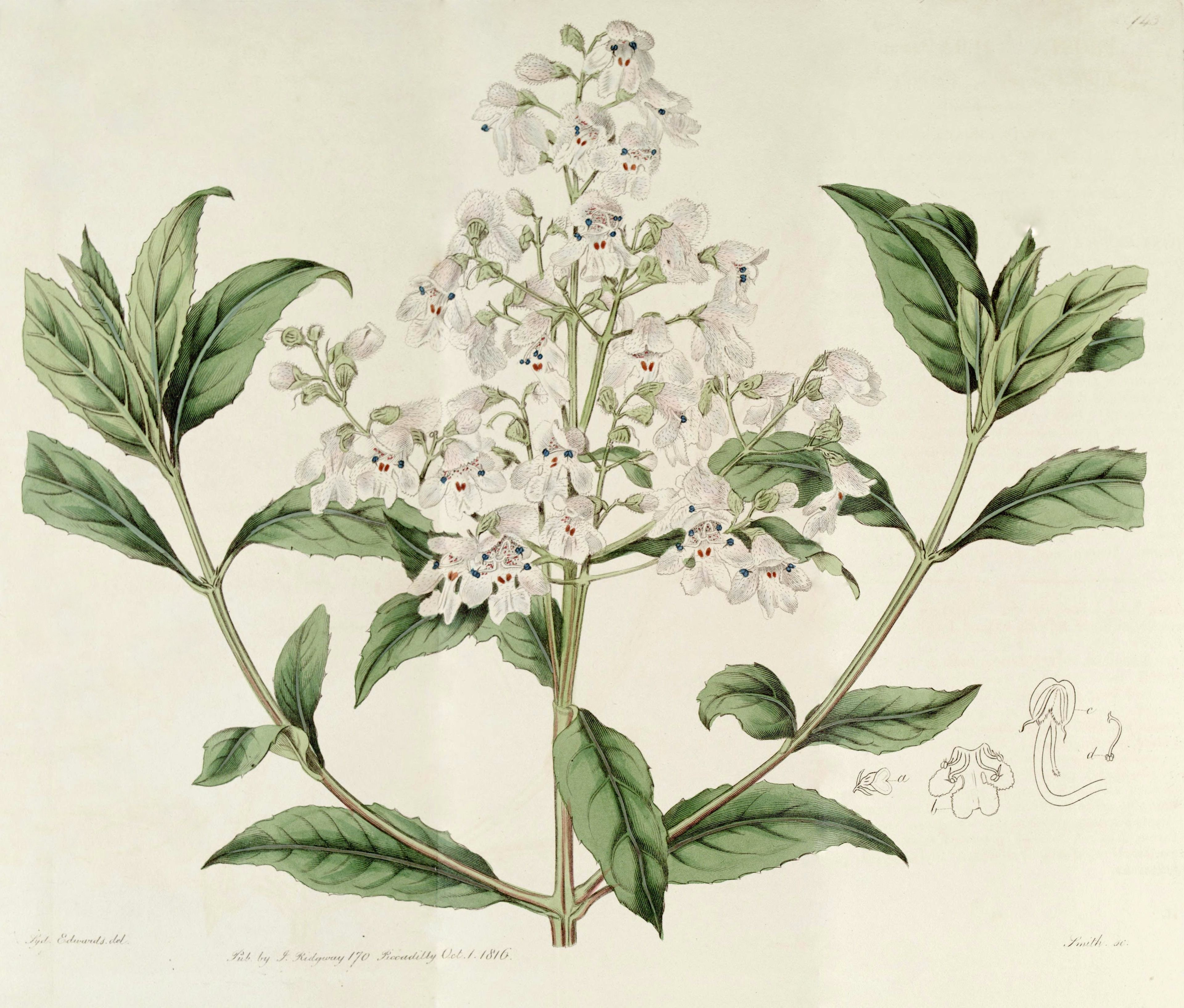
P. lasianthos (artist: Sydenham Edwards)

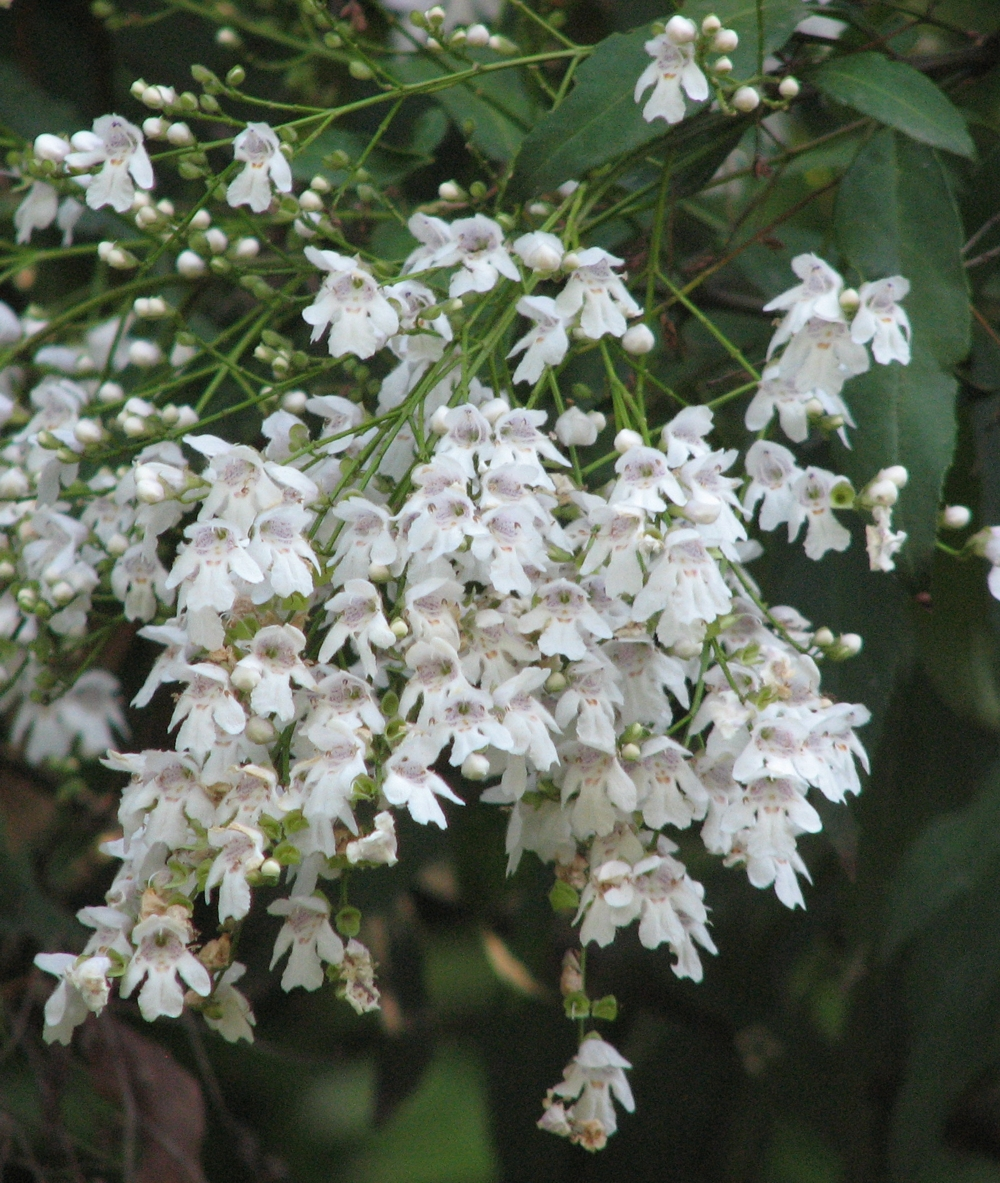
