= List of invasive species in Australia =

This is a list of some of the more notable invasive species in Australia.

== Plants ==
The Australian Weeds Committee maintains a noxious weeds list covering all the states and territories.

- Acacia farnesiana (sweet acacia)
- Ageratina riparia (mistflower)
- Ailanthus altissima (tree of heaven)
- Alternanthera philoxeroides (alligator weed)
- Andropogon virginicus (broomsedge)
- Annona glabra (alligator apple)
- Anredera cordifolia (Madeira vine)
- Ardisia elliptica (shoebutton Ardisia)
- Arundo donax (giant cane)
- Asparagus aethiopicus (asparagus fern)
- Berberis thunbergii (Japanese barberry)
- Brassica tournefortii (African mustard)
- Bromus rubens (foxtail brome)
- Chrysanthemoides monilifera (bitou bush)
- Cinnamomum camphora (camphor laurel)
- Cryptostegia grandiflora (rubber vine)
- Echium plantagineum (Paterson's curse)
- Hypericum perforatum (St. John's wort)
- Lantana camara (lantana)
- Leucanthemum vulgare (ox-eye daisy)
- Opuntia spp. (prickly pear)
- Solanum mauritianum (wild tobacco)
- Sporobolus pyramidalis (giant rat's tail grass)

== Crustaceans ==
- Amphibalanus improvisus (bay barnacle)
- Carcinus maenas (shore crab)
- Cherax destructor (common yabby, invasive in Western Australia)
- Limnoria quadripunctata (gribble)

== Insects ==
- Bemisia tabaci (Silverleaf whitefly)
- Solenopsis invicta (Red imported fire ant)
- Vespula germanica (European wasp)
- Monomorium pharaonis (Pharaoh ant)
- Paratrechina Longicornis (longhorn crazy ant)
- Anoplolepis gracilipes (yellow crazy ant)
- Apis cerana (eastern honey bee)
- Aedes albopictus (tiger mosquito)
- Aethina tumida (small hive beetle)
- Aphis spiraecola (green citrus aphid)
- Bruchophagus roddi (alfalfa seed chalcid)
- Cerataphis lataniae (palm aphid)
- Ceratitis capitata (Mediterranean fruit fly)
- Corythucha ciliata (sycamore lace bug)
- Diuraphis noxia (Russian wheat aphid)
- Euwallacea fornicatus (tea shot-hole borer)
- Forficula auricularia (common earwig)
- Frankliniella occidentalis (western flower thrips)
- Hylurgus ligniperda (red-haired pine bark beetle)
- Idioscopus nitidulus (mango leafhopper)
- Linepithema humile (Argentine ant)
- Maconellicoccus hirsutus (hibiscus mealybug)
- Pheidole megacephala (coastal brown ant)
- Phylacteophaga froggatti (leafblister sawfly)
- Pineus pini (pine adelgid)
- Sitobion miscanthi (Indian grain aphid)
- Solenopsis geminata (ginger ant)
- Spodoptera frugiperda (fall armyworm)
- Spodoptera litura (Oriental leafworm moth)
- Tapinoma melanocephalum (ghost ant)
- Tremex fuscicornis (tremex wasp)
- Trichomyrmex destructor (destructive trailing ant)
- Vespula vulgaris (common wasp)
- Wasmannia auropunctata (electric ant)
- Xanthogaleruca luteola (elm-leaf beetle)
- Xyleborinus saxesenii (fruit-tree pinhole borer)

== Molluscs ==
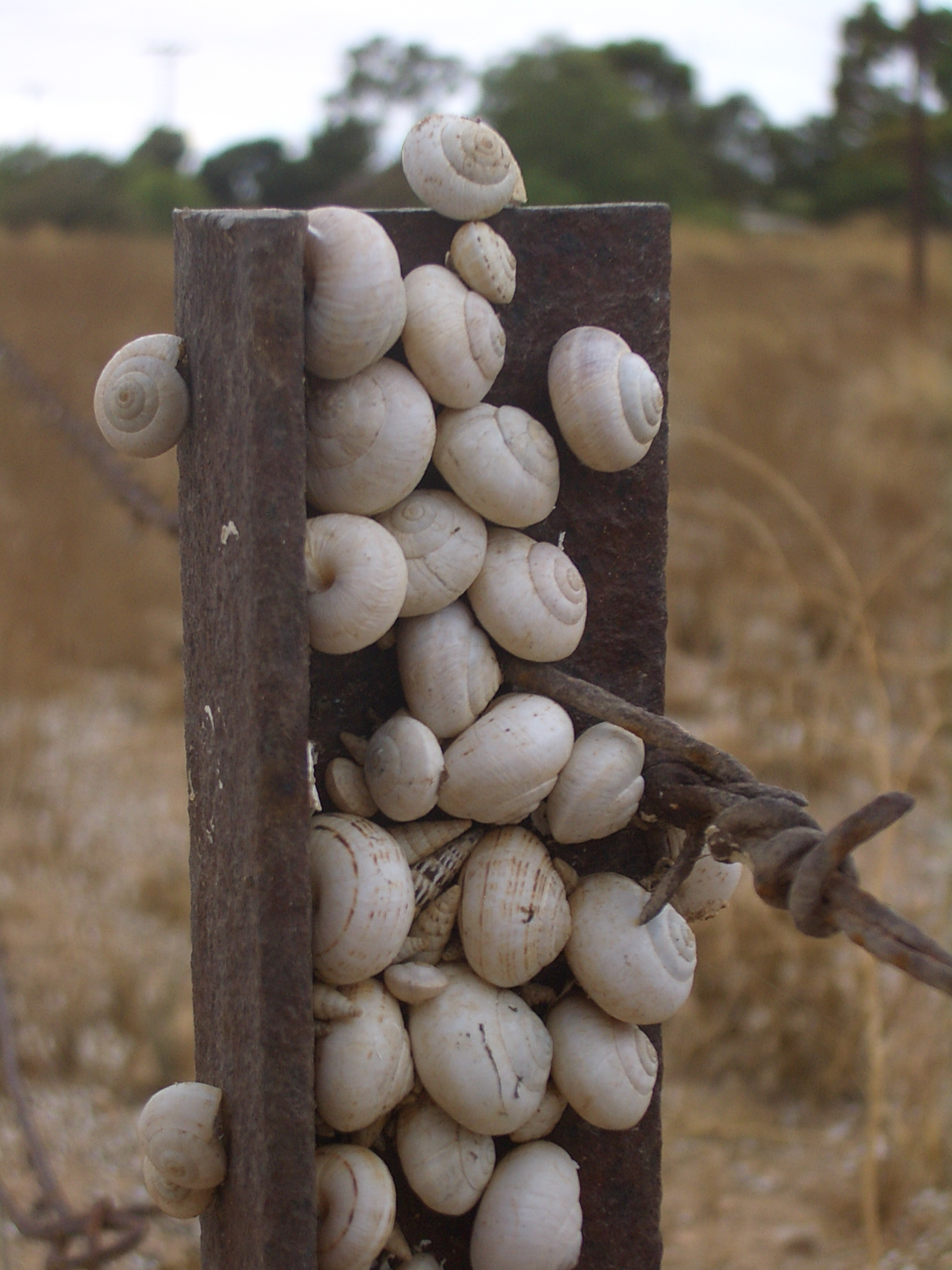
Native to the Mediterranean regions, more than one species of white snail is now quite common in Kadina and elsewhere in South Australia. This image shows many Theba pisana, and a number of smaller and more pointed Cochlicella acuta aestivating on a fence post.

- Cernuella virgata (Common white snail)
- Cochlicella acuta (Pointed snail)
- Cochlicella barbara (Small pointed snail)
- Cornu aspersum (garden snail)
- Deroceras invadens (tramp slug)
- Deroceras laeve (marsh slug)
- Magallana gigas (Pacific oyster)
- Musculista senhousia (Asian mussel)
- Theba pisana (White garden snail)

== Fish (freshwater) ==
- Acanthogobius flavimanus (yellowfin goby)
- Astronotus ocellatus (oscar)
- Carassius auratus (Goldfish)
- Cyprinus carpio (Common carp)
- Gambusia holbrooki (Gambusia)
- Misgurnus anguillicaudatus (Asian weatherloach)
- Oncorhynchus mykiss (Rainbow trout)
- Oreochromis spp. (Tilapia)
- Pelmatolapia mariae (spotted tilapia)
- Perca fluviatilis (European perch, redfin perch)
- Salmo trutta (Brown trout)
- Xiphophorus hellerii (green swordtail)
- poecilia reticulata (feral guppies)

== Reptiles & amphibians ==
- Hemidactylus frenatus (House Gecko)
- Rhinella marina (Cane toad)
- Trachemys scripta elegans (red-eared slider)
- Lissotriton vulgaris (Smooth newts)

== Birds ==
- Acridotheres tristis (Common myna)
- Columba livia (Domestic pigeon)
- Passer domesticus (House sparrow)
- Spilopelia chinensis (Spotted dove)
- Sturnus vulgaris (Common starling)
- Alauda arvensis (Skylark)
- Turdus merula (Eurasian Blackbird)
- Passer montanus (Eurasian Tree Sparrow)
- Carduelis carduelis (European Goldfinch)
- Chloris chloris (European Greenfinch)
- Gallus gallus (Red junglefowl)
- Gallus varius (green junglefowl)
- Pavo cristatus (Indian peafowl)
- Anas platyrhynchos (mallard)
- Spilopelia senegalensis (laughing dove)
- Struthio camelus (common ostrich)
- Turdus philomelos (song thrush)
- Pycnonotus jocosus (Red-whiskered bulbul)

== Mammals ==
- Bos javanicus (Banteng)
- Bubalus bubalis (Water buffalo)
- Camelus dromedarius (Feral camel)
- Canis lupus familiaris (Wild dogs)
- Capra hircus (Feral goat)
- Cervus elaphus (Red deer)
- Equus asinus (Feral donkey)
- Equus caballus (Feral horse)
- Felis silvestris catus (Feral cat)
- Lepus europaeus (European hare)
- Mus musculus (House mouse)
- Oryctolagus cuniculus (European rabbit)
- Rattus norvegicus (Brown rat)
- Rattus rattus (Black rat)
- Sus scrofa domestica (Razorback)
- Vulpes vulpes (Red fox)
- Funambulus pennantii (Five-lined palm squirrel)
- Axis axis (Chital deer)
- Axis porcinus (Hog deer)
- Cervus timorensis (Rusa deer)
- Dama dama (Fallow deer)
- Cervus unicolor (Sambar Deer)
- Antilope cervicapra (Blackbuck)

== Echinoderms ==
- Asterias amurensis (Northern Pacific seastar)

== Fungi and pathogens ==
- Batrachochytrium dendrobatidis (Frog chytrid fungus)
