= Mount Barrington =

Mountain in New South Wales, Australia

- Barrington Volcano
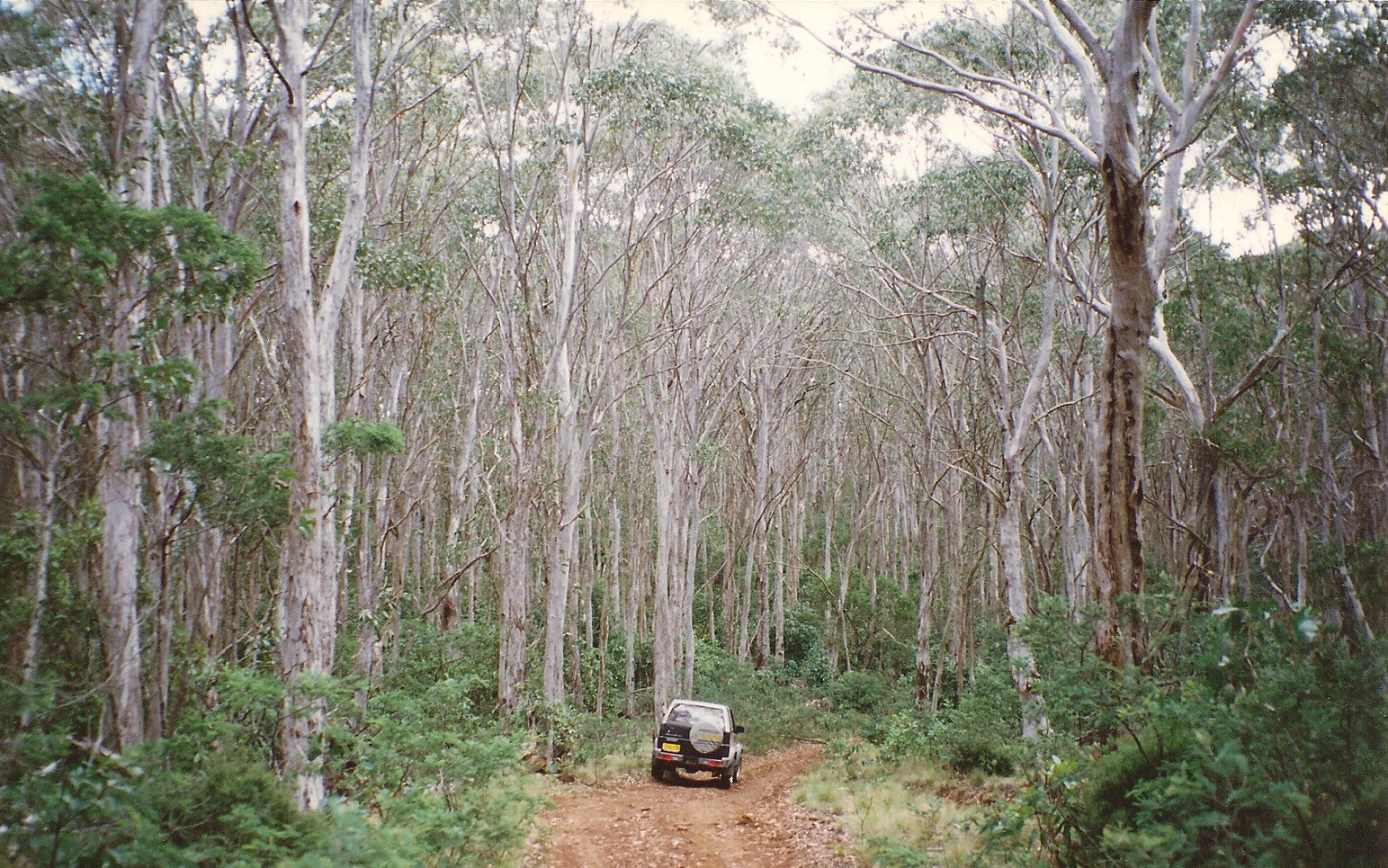
- Snow gums near the Mount Barrington summit

Highest point
- Elevation: 1,555 m (5,102 ft)
- Coordinates: 32°03′S 151°24′E

Geography
- Location within New South Wales
- Location: Barrington Tops National Park, New South Wales, Australia
- Parent range: Mount Royal Range

Geology
- Rock age: Eocene
- Mountain type: Shield volcano

Mount Barrington, a mountain that is part of the Mount Royal Range, is located on the Barrington Tops plateau in the Mid-Coast Council within New South Wales, Australia and has an elevation of 1,555 metres (5,102 ft) above sea level.

Now the remnants of a volcano, Mount Barrington, formerly the Barrington Volcano, erupted near its present peak between 44 and 54 million years ago. The eruption caused a 700-cubic-kilometre (170 cu mi) basalt flow, which covered much of the Barrington Tops plateau. The lava was up to 1,000 metres (3,300 ft) thick.

The extensive rainforests in the area grow on much of the resultant red/brown soils. Gemstones such as zircon, sapphire, sapphirine and ruby were formed from the volcano. Nearby Careys Peak is considered a vent in this extinct shield volcano. The surrounding area is covered by sub alpine snow gum woodland, with rainforest on the escarpment edge and in fire free gullies.

== See also ==
- List of mountains of Australia § New South Wales
