= Barrington Tops =

Mountainous area in New South Wales, Australia

- Plateau
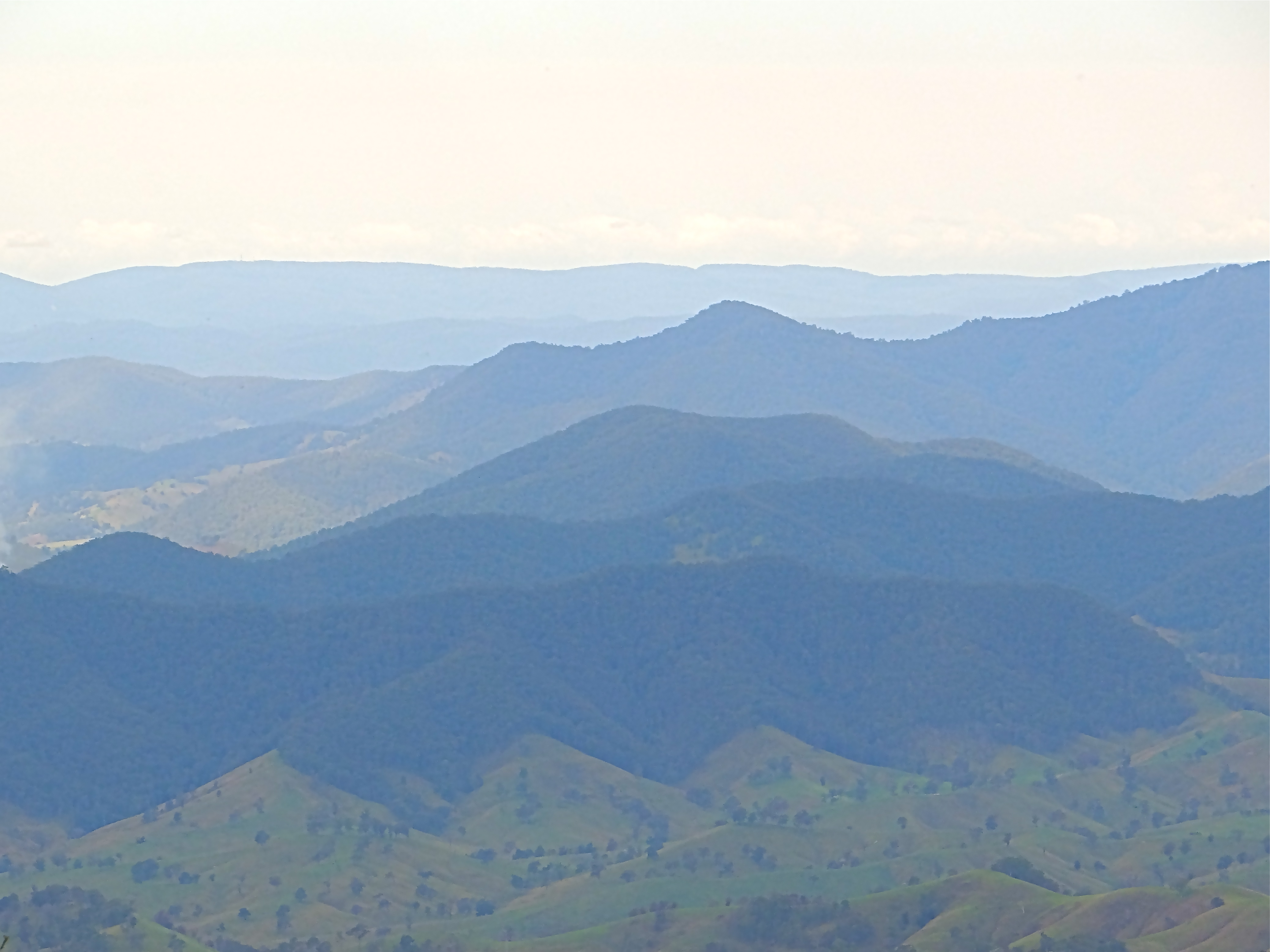
- The skyline
- Interactive map of Barrington Tops
- Location: New South Wales
- Range: Mount Royal Range; Allyn Range
- Part of: Great Dividing Range
- Highest elevation: 1,586 m (5,203 ft) (Brumlow Top)

Barrington Tops is part of the Great Dividing Range in New South Wales, Australia, between Gloucester and Scone.

In 1934, the area was difficult to access and was described as being "not traceable to any man-made feature".

Part of the area has been conserved as the Barrington Tops National Park and as the Barrington Tops State Conservation Area.

Invasive species are a problem in parts of Barrington Tops. Feral animals, including feral horses, goats, dogs, cats, pigs, foxes and deer occur in the area, and control measures are undertaken by the National Parks and Wildlife Service. Scotch broom (Cytisus scoparius) infests 10,000 ha (20,000 acres) of the national park. Biological control agents including the broom gall mite (Aceria genistae) are being tested for their effectiveness.

Tasmanian devils have been reintroduced by Aussie Ark to enclosures near Barrington Tops in a project to save the endangered species that is at serious risk of extinction. Its 400-hectare (990-acre) Barrington Wildlife Sanctuary was officially opened in November 2021, with the aim of protecting the natural habitat by removing noxious weeds and augmentation with native plants, and returning extirpated species. In late 2020, 26 adult devils were released into the wildlife sanctuary, and by late April 2021, seven joeys had been born, with up to 20 expected by the end of the year. Other breeding programs include the eastern quoll.
