= Mount Royal Range =

Mountain range in New South Wales, Australia

Mount Royal
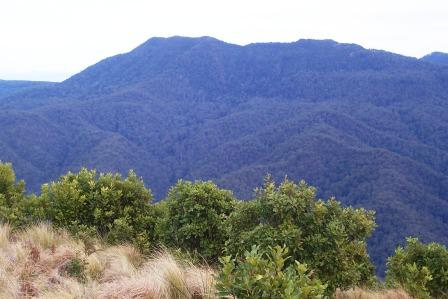
- Mount Royal photographed from Mount Cabrebald, Barrington Tops National Park.

Highest point
- Peak: Brumlow Tops
- Elevation: 1,586 m (5,203 ft)
- Listing: Mountains of Australia

Dimensions
- Length: 95 km (59 mi) S

Geography
- Location within New South Wales
- Country: Australia
- State: New South Wales
- Region: Hunter
- Range coordinates: 31°50′S 151°29′E
- Parent range: Great Dividing Range

The Mount Royal Range is a mountain range in the Hunter Valley, New South Wales, Australia.

== Location and features ==
The Mount Royal Range is a spur on the eastern side of the Great Dividing Range. It diverges from the Liverpool Range at a point north of Scone, New South Wales, near Ben Halls Gap. The range generally extends to the southeast for about 45 kilometres (28 mi) and then generally to the south southwest for about 50 kilometres (31 mi) to Mount Royal. The range generally forms the divide between the Hunter River and Manning River drainage basins, both of which drain to the Tasman Sea.

The range contains a number of prominent peaks including:

- Brumlow Tops with an elevation of 1,586 metres (5,203 ft) AHD
- Mount Polblue with an elevation of 1,575 metres (5,167 ft) AHD
- Mount Barrington with an elevation of 1,555 metres (5,102 ft) AHD
- Mount Royal with an elevation of 1,185 metres (3,888 ft) AHD
- Mount Allyn with an elevation of 1,125 metres (3,691 ft) AHD
- Prospero with an elevation of 1,189 metres (3,901 ft) AHD
- Gulph Mountain
- Gog and Magog
- The Pinnacle
- Paddys Ridge
- Mount William
- Mount Paterson
- Mount Toonumbue
- the Belgrave Pinnacle
- Mirannie Mountain
- Mount George
- Hudsons Peak
- Mount Johnstone

== Etymology ==
The range is named after Mount Royal, one of its prominent peaks.

== Water storage ==
To provide water for the Bayswater Power Station, the Barnard River Scheme was constructed in the 1980s so water could be transported over the range into the Hunter River.

== Geology ==
The Mount Royal range forms the northern rim of the Hunter Region. The Barrington Tops, an elevated plateau at the headwaters of the Barrington River, are part of the Mount Royal Range. The World Heritage listed Barrington Tops National Park includes this area.

== Gallery ==
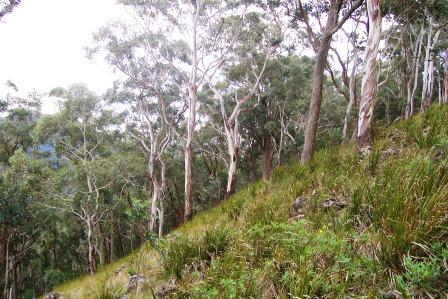
Mount Royal - eucalyptus forest

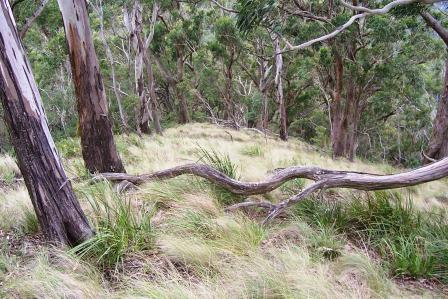
Mount Royal - eucalyptus forest

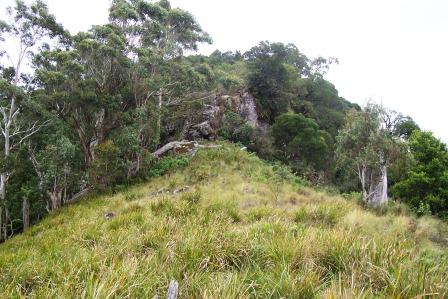
Mount Royal, basalt at 1100 metres

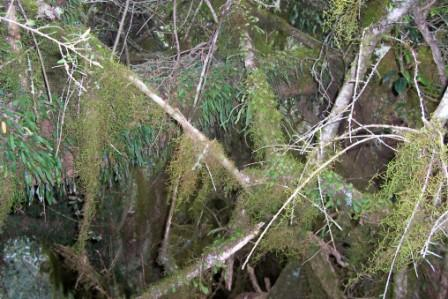
Mount Royal - cloud forest, moss & ferns

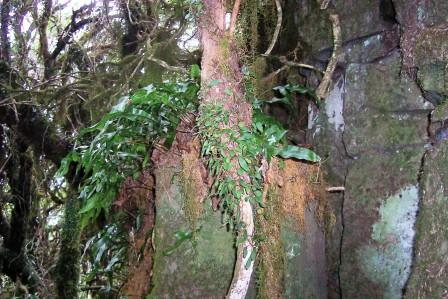
Mount Royal - cloud forest, basalt & ferns

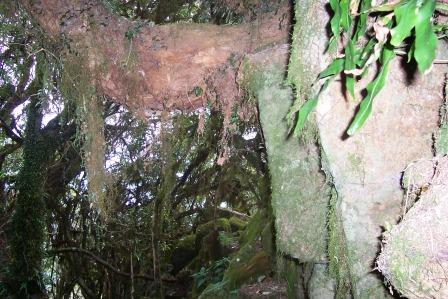
Mount Royal, cloud forest, basalt, ferns & moss

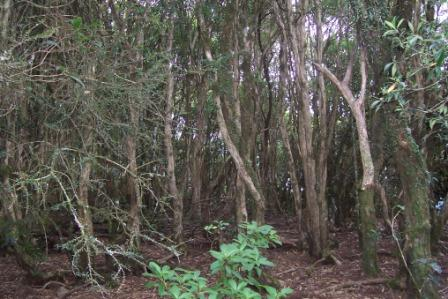
Mount Royal, cloud forest, hill water gum rainforest at summit

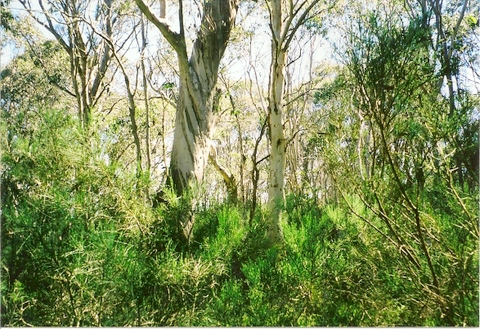
Snow gums at Brumlow Tops summit, elevation 1586 metres, the highest point in northern New South Wales
