= Barrington Tops National Park =

National park in Australia

- IUCN category Ib (wilderness area)
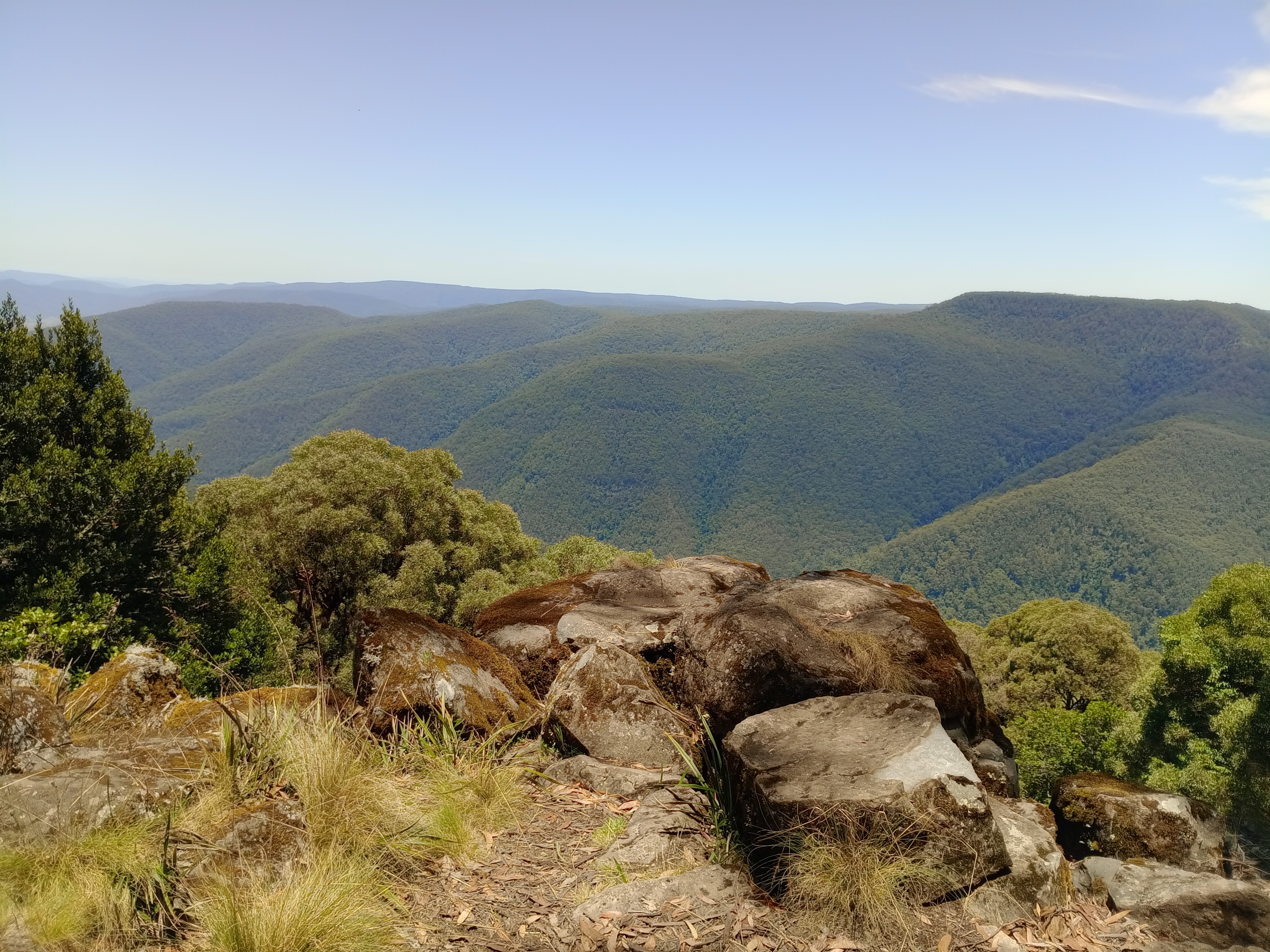
- Mt Carson (far right) and the surrounding ranges viewed from Thunderbolt's Lookout, Jan 2025

- Location within New South Wales
- Location: New South Wales
- Nearest city: Gloucester
- Coordinates: 32°3′10″S 151°29′37″E
- Area: 765.12 km^{2} (295.41 sq mi)
- Established: 3 December 1969
- Governing body: NSW National Parks & Wildlife Service
- Website: https://www.nationalparks.nsw.gov.au/visit-a-park/parks/barrington-tops-national-park

The Barrington Tops National Park is a protected national park in the Hunter Valley in New South Wales, Australia. Gazetted in 1969, the 76,512-hectare (189,070-acre) park is situated between Scone, Singleton, Dungog, Gloucester and East Gresford.

The park is part of the Barrington Tops group World Heritage Site Gondwana Rainforests of Australia inscribed in 1986 and added to the Australian National Heritage List in 2007.

It is also part of the Barrington Tops and Gloucester Tops Important Bird Area.

== Environment ==
=== Geology ===
Barrington Tops is part of the Mount Royal Range, a spur of the Great Dividing Range. Barrington Tops is a plateau between two of the large peaks in the range. The park is believed to be an extinct volcano and the mountain ranges are made up of a mixture of sedimentary rocks with a granite top. Erosion has weathered the granite and rounded granite boulders can be seen in some areas of the park. Estimates put the age of the rock at 300 to 400 million years, well before Australia separated from Gondwana.

=== Climate ===
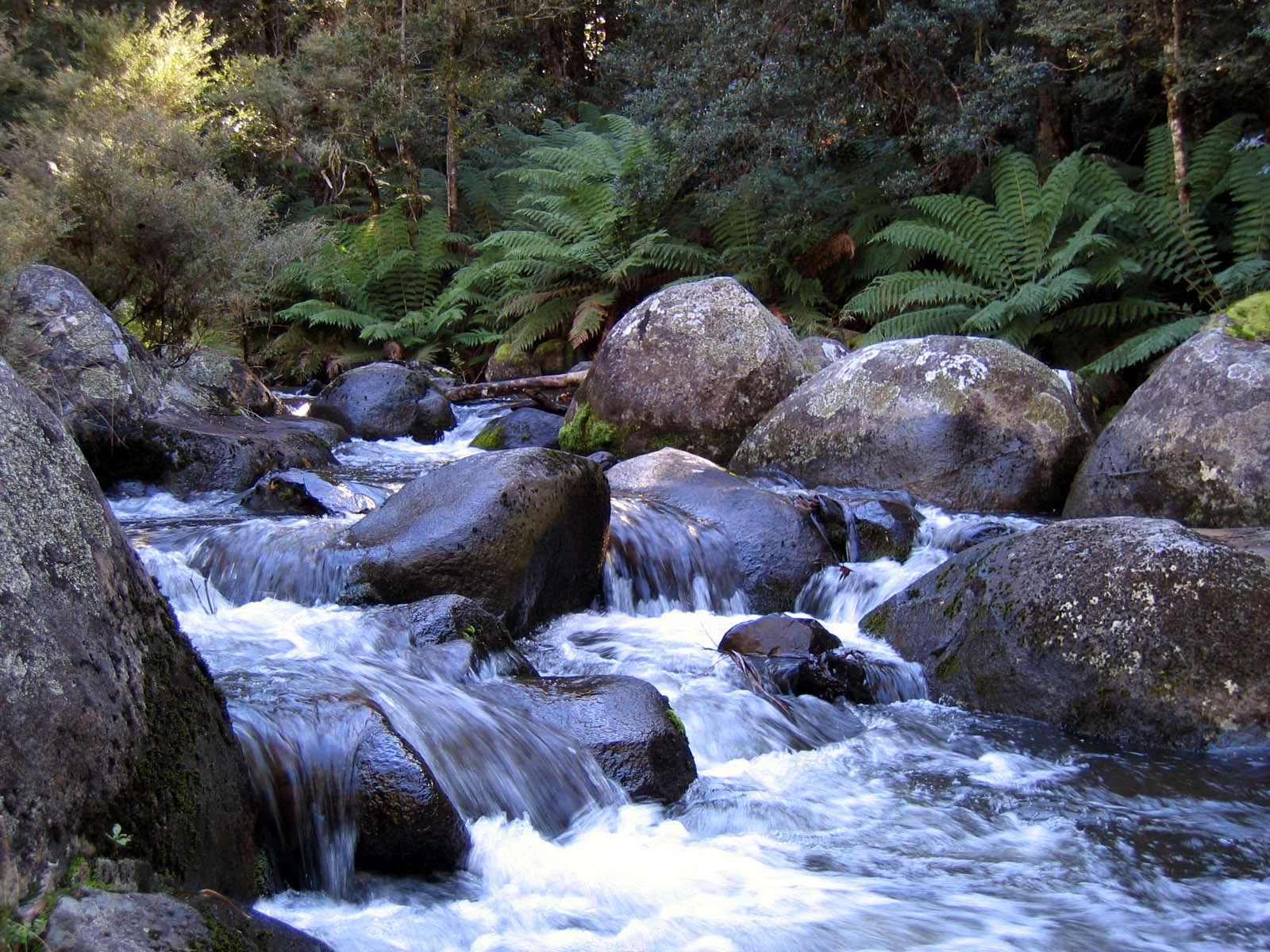
Barrington River

The climate varies from temperate on the lower altitudes to subalpine at highest elevations. A record low of −17 °C (1 °F) has been registered at 1,500 m (4,900 ft) above mean sea level. Rainfalls fluctuate between 750 millimetres (30 in) in the northwest to more than 2,000 mm (79 in) in the southeast.

=== Flora ===
The ecology of the national park varies from subtropical rainforests in the gullies to subalpine and alpine regions on the mountain peaks. Snow usually falls on the mountain peaks every year and occasionally snows enough to close roads. Rainfall can exceed 1,500 mm (59 in) per annum.

A large variety of plants and animals reside in the park and the steepness of the terrain ensures that they are not disturbed by humans. Plant life includes a large variety of eucalypt trees including snow gums, subtropical and temperate rainforest trees like Antarctic beech, tree ferns, a large variety of mosses and ferns and a wide range of edible plants such as the native raspberry, the native cherry and the lilli pilli.

=== Fauna ===
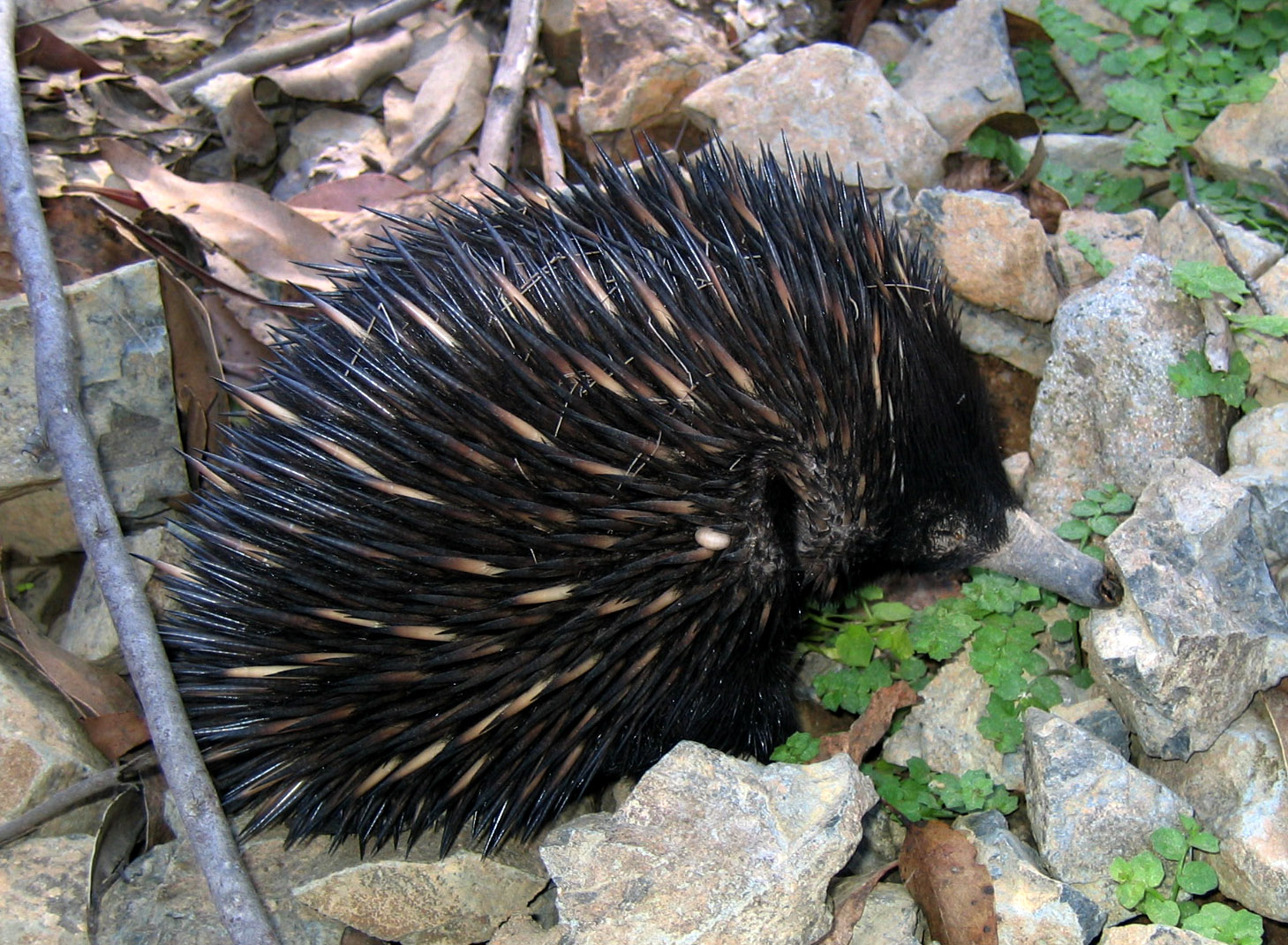
An echidna on a walking trail

The remoteness and inaccessibility of a large part of the park has allowed some of the more sensitive animals to remain largely undisturbed. A large number of fauna have been catalogued in the park. Some of the more common animals include: barking and sooty owls, eastern grey kangaroos, frogs, pademelons, cockatoos, rosellas, kookaburras, bats and echidnas. It supports a globally important population of rufous scrub-birds, as well as flame robins, pale-yellow robins, paradise riflebirds, green catbirds, regent bowerbirds and Australian logrunners.

Animals such as quolls, native rodents and platypus are reclusive, but may be seen. Not all of the animals in the park are desirable; introduced species such as feral horses, deer, feral pigs, feral goats, foxes, and feral cats are planned to be removed.

== History ==
The traditional owners of the area are Aboriginal Australian peoples, including the Gringai people (southern valleys), the Wonnarua people (western country), and the Worimi and Birpai people (the eastern side).

=== National Park and World Heritage Area ===
In 1969 the area between Mount Barrington, Mount Royal and the Gloucester Tops was declared the Barrington Tops National Park. In 1986 it was listed as a World Heritage Area and subsequently a Wilderness Area. Some of the rivers flowing through the Barrington range have been classed as wild rivers meaning they are exceptionally pure and unpolluted. The highest peak is Brumlow Top which rises to a height of 1,586 metres (5,203 ft).

=== Aircraft crashes ===
A number of aircraft have crashed in and around the Barrington Tops; Aeroplane Hill is named after one of the crashes. The altitude, frequent fog and cloud, storms and cold weather (causing icing) make this area potentially hazardous to aircraft. One article refers to the "Devil's Triangle".

- 16 April 1945 – De Havilland Mosquito A52-70. Wreckage found January 1946 in the national park. The propeller, ailerons and machine gun were on display at the Barrington Tops Guest House.
- 25 September 1967 – RAAF Mirage III-O A3-52. Pilot ejected safely. The ejection seat was later recovered and is on display at Fighter World aviation heritage centre.
- 14 September 1969 – Lockheed Hudson VH-SML crashed in the foothills. 3 killed.
- 9 August 1981 – Cessna 210 VH-MDX. 5 killed, multiple searches have not found wreckage or bodies.
- 3 August 1987 – Aermacchi MB-326H A7-079 (built as CA30-79). Crew ejected. Wreckage located by bushwalkers 28 April 1995. One crew member was rescued from a tree after three hours.

=== Barrington Guest House ===
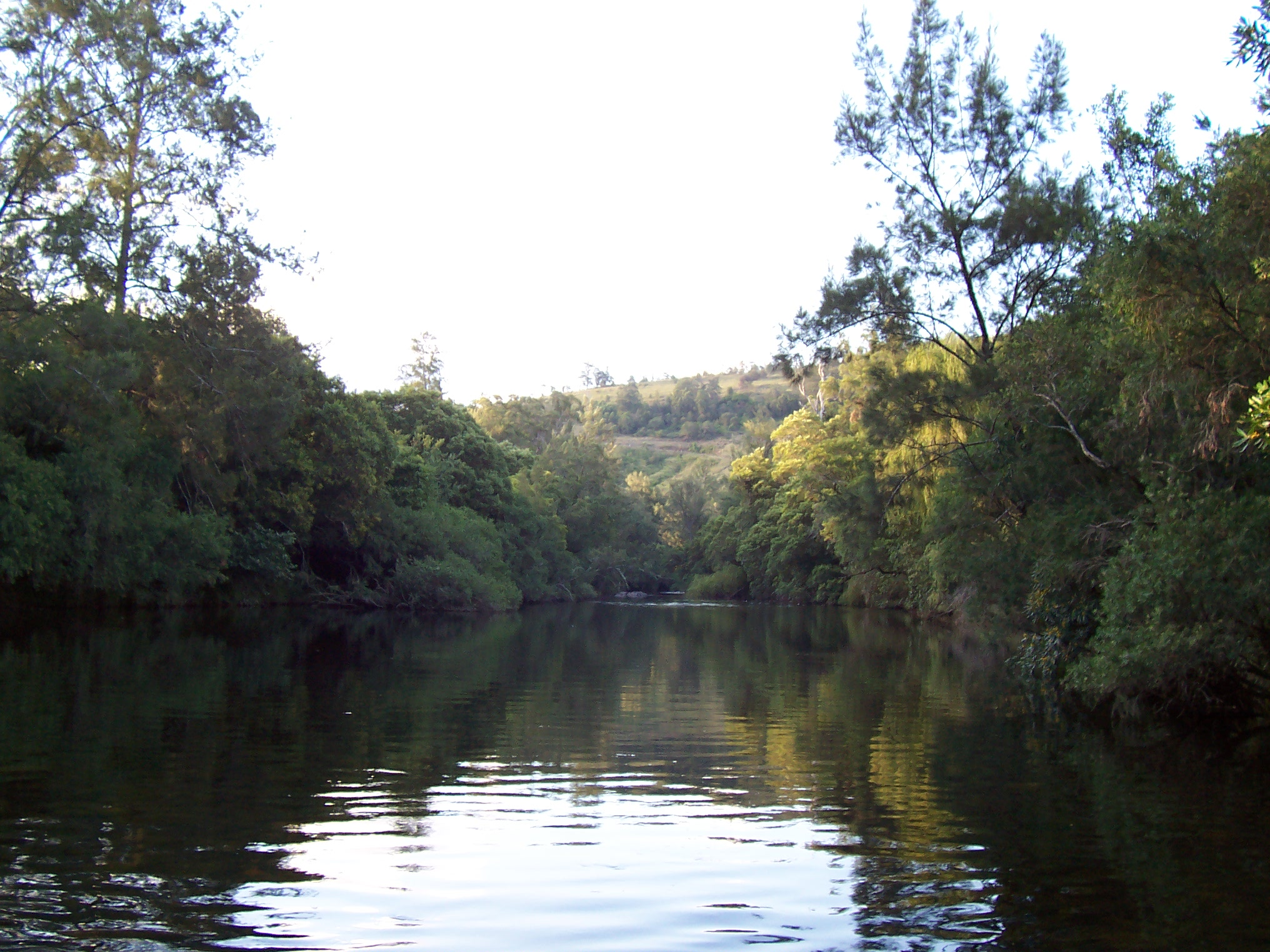
Barrington River

The Barrington Guest House was built from 1925 on the upper Williams River near Barrington Tops by Norman T. McLeod, licensee of the Royal Hotel in Dungog, using timber cut and milled from the property. It stood on land consisting of 10.5 hectares (26 acres) of forest surrounded by National and State Parks and was officially opened in 1930 by Leader of the Country Party Earle Page, with some 200 guests attending.

The guest house was a popular venue for people to stay in the park, until it burned down in a fire at 11pm on 24 September 2006 due to an electrical fault. The fire was not regarded as suspicious. It was undergoing modernisation under new ownership at the time of the fire. There are plans to rebuild, but no significant process has been made, and only part of the old chimney remains on the site. The guest house has undergone many different owners in its history. Mattara Investments, trading as Barrington Guest House, bought the premises in 1976. Due to business troubles however, it was placed into voluntary administration in 2000, after which the business was taken over by David and Susan Eissa in February 2002. Only one more owner has been known since (according to the now defunct website); it was purchased in January 2004 by Natalie Day and Tony Horley. In April 2024, the site was purchased by a group of previous guests and owners who are making it safe to enable future visitation (2025).

== Access ==
Barrington Tops is a popular weekend destination from Sydney and Newcastle. Numerous walking trails and camping grounds are scattered throughout the park. The park also contains well marked and well-maintained gravel roads as well as specific 4WD tracks into less travelled areas. General sightseeing can be accomplished in a non-offroad vehicle. As well as camping facilities, the nearby towns of Gloucester and Dungog have many places to stay. The park is maintained by the NSW National Parks & Wildlife Service and rangers patrol the park daily.

== See also ==
- Barrington Tops State Conservation Area
- Careys Peak
- List of mountains in Australia § New South Wales
- Protected areas of New South Wales
