= Wallarobba Shire =

Former local government area in New South Wales, Australia

- Local government area
- Coordinates: 32.502°S 151.703°E
- Country: Australia
- State: New South Wales
- Region: Hunter
- Established: 7 March 1906
- Abolished: 1 July 1958
- Council seat: Dungog

Wallarobba Shire was a local government area in the Hunter region of New South Wales, Australia.

Wallarobba Shire was proclaimed on 7 March 1906, one of 134 shires created after the passing of the Local Government (Shires) Act 1905.

The shire office was in Dungog. Towns and villages in the shire included East Gresford, Gresford, Clarence Town, Vacy, Salisbury, Torryburn, Martins Creek and initially Booral.

Wallarobba Shire amalgamated with Municipality of Dungog to form Dungog Shire on 1 July 1958.
