= Mount Rivers, New South Wales =

Mount Rivers
- Coordinates: 32°21′S 151°29′E
- Country: Australia
- State: New South Wales
- LGA: Dungog
- Location: 27 km (17 mi) WNW of Dungog; 10 km (6.2 mi) NW of East Gresford
- Established: 1850

Population
  - Total: 43 (2016)
- Postcode: 2311
- County: Durham
- Parish: St Julian
- Gazetted: 15 September 1978

Mount Rivers is a locality in the Dungog Shire, New South Wales, Australia.

== History ==
In 1825, John Phillips Webber established his Penshurt estate in present-day Mount Rivers. The estate was sold in 1834 to George Townsend for a thousand pounds. The land was subdivided into 6 lots in 1855 and then further subdivided into 10 lots in 1914. A post office was opened in 1861, and a telephone exchange opened at the office in 1917. The post office was moved to a new site in 1927 after the land was sold, and moved again in 1931. After the resignation of the postmistress in 1966, the post office was permanently closed in 1967.

Mount Rivers was well known for its cheese circa 1900. A cheese factory was established by Alfred Holden, procuring a considerable reputation, with its produce being sold as "Penshurst" cheese in Maitland

Initially, Mount Rivers had a private school. It was converted to a public school in 1875. A decline in enrolments forced it to cease as a public school in 1924. However, through subsidisation, it continued to exist, and in 1939 it reopened as an official public school. Eventually, the school was closed in 1981.

== Geography ==
The Paterson River flows from the Lostock Dam into the north of Mount Rivers, and then flows out, south-west, into Gresford. A river crossing along Cross Keys Road traverses the Paterson River, permitting alternate passage to westerly and southerly neighbouring towns such as East Gresford and Dungog.
