= George Augustus Middleton =

Clergy man

George Augustus Middleton (1791–1848) was an English-Australian pastor and farmer who spent his time in Australia between Parramatta and the Hunter Valley.

== Early life ==
George Middleton was reportedly born on 31 August 1791 in London. However, his age was often misreported throughout his life, including on his gravestone. A common rumour among his descendants suggests that he was the illegitimate son of a Lady Middleton and a member of the royal family. His presumed father was Charles Middleton.

Middleton was educated at Westminster School before attending St John's College at Cambridge University. There, he studied classics while on a scholarship as a bishop boy. However, he did not complete his degree.

He began his career as a private tutor at Holland House in London before returning to Westminster School as a teacher. On 18 July 1818, he became a bishop of London. He was appointed as an ordained priest for the Australian colonies in 1819.

== Time in Sydney ==
Middleton arrived in Port Jackson on 27 January 1820, accompanied by his son George. In August 1819, he had been commissioned as an assistant chaplain for New South Wales at the age of 29.

Initially serving as an assistant chaplain, Middleton was also directed to work as locum tenens. While in Parramatta, he worked as a school examiner and contributed to Sunday schools. A significant portion of his income came from performing marriage ceremonies.

=== Move from Sydney ===
In 1831, due to a prolonged drought, he decided to move his family from Sydney. They relocated to Waterview House, one of the first houses built in Balmain. The following year, in 1832 he established a school.

== Time in Hunter Valley ==
=== Appointments and ministry ===
By December 1820, Middleton was appointed to serve in Newcastle, becoming the first chaplain to serve north of the Hawkesbury River. In March 1821, he was appointed the Assistant Chaplain of Newcastle. During his time there, he created the vestry of Christ Church. He travelled along the Paterson and Williams River, Patrick's Plain and Segenhoe in order to visit free settlers.

In 1825, he visited Lake Macquarie. There, he worked with the Awabakal aboriginal people of Newcastle. He helped Reverend Lancelot Threlkeld establish a mission for Indigenous people in Belmont.

In 1826, Middleton voiced strong objections to the treatment of convicts by Archdeacon Thomas Scott. The following year, in May 1827, he resigned when Scott attempted to transfer him to Port Macquarie. Middleton then relocated to Moore Park near Hinton, where he established a travelling ministry independent of the Anglican Church.

Although Middleton had convicts on his property, his work with them was limited. He only interacted to convicts assigned to his property or those who worked on road gangs. His ministry was primarily performed on free settlers.

From 1828 to 1830, he travelled across the regions of Morpeth, Maitland, Branxton, and Paterson, where he visited patrons and performed baptisms. In 1837, Bishop William Grant Broughton granted Middleton a license to perform marriage ceremonies at his home, as no churches existed in the area. Middleton conducted much of his work at Bishop Broughton's home in Phoenix Park.

In 1845, he became the chaplain of St Paul's Church in Paterson when it opened. He also ran a school in Morpeth while working with the Butterwick parish. His duties as a priest included preparing children for confirmation and performing marriage ceremonies, baptisms, and funerals including occasional ceremonies outside his parish.

=== Farming ===
In 1821, Middleton selected 400 acres of land on the Patersons Plains, upstream from the government settlement. By the end of 1822, he had cleared 14 acres and grew 9 acres of wheat. He owned 3 horses, 54 cattle, and 52 pigs. In 1826, he was invited to surrender his land at Patersons Plains to the church and school corporation in return for compensation. He agreed in 1827 and received compensation.

In 1828, he was granted 2,000 acres of Crown Land at Patersons Plains adjoining James Webber's land, which he named Glenrose. On 8 May 1829, he received a grazing licence for 1,000 acres of land. On 19 April 1829, Sir George Gipps granted Middleton another 2,000 acres of land. Later, he was required to give a quarter acre of land to establish a cemetery.

== Personal life ==
=== Organizations ===
Middleton was a member of the Agricultural Society of New South Wales, the Agricultural Society, and the Paterson Farmers' Club. He was also involved in the Benevolent Society where he became a regular donor and the treasurer of the committee. He also served as a justice of the peace.

He previously joined a vogue with John Blaxland Junior where they discovered an overland route to Newcastle.

=== Marriages ===
On 17 March 1817, he married his first wife Mary Hull, who died before he came to Australia.

He married his second wife, Sarah, on 12 February 1824 in Liverpool. They had fifteen children together.

=== Death ===
Middleton reportedly died on 15 May 1848 in Hinton. No death certificate was ever produced, and his cause of death remains unknown. His funeral took place on 18 May 1848 at St James Church in Morpeth. He is buried with his wife Sarah in Morpeth cemetery.
