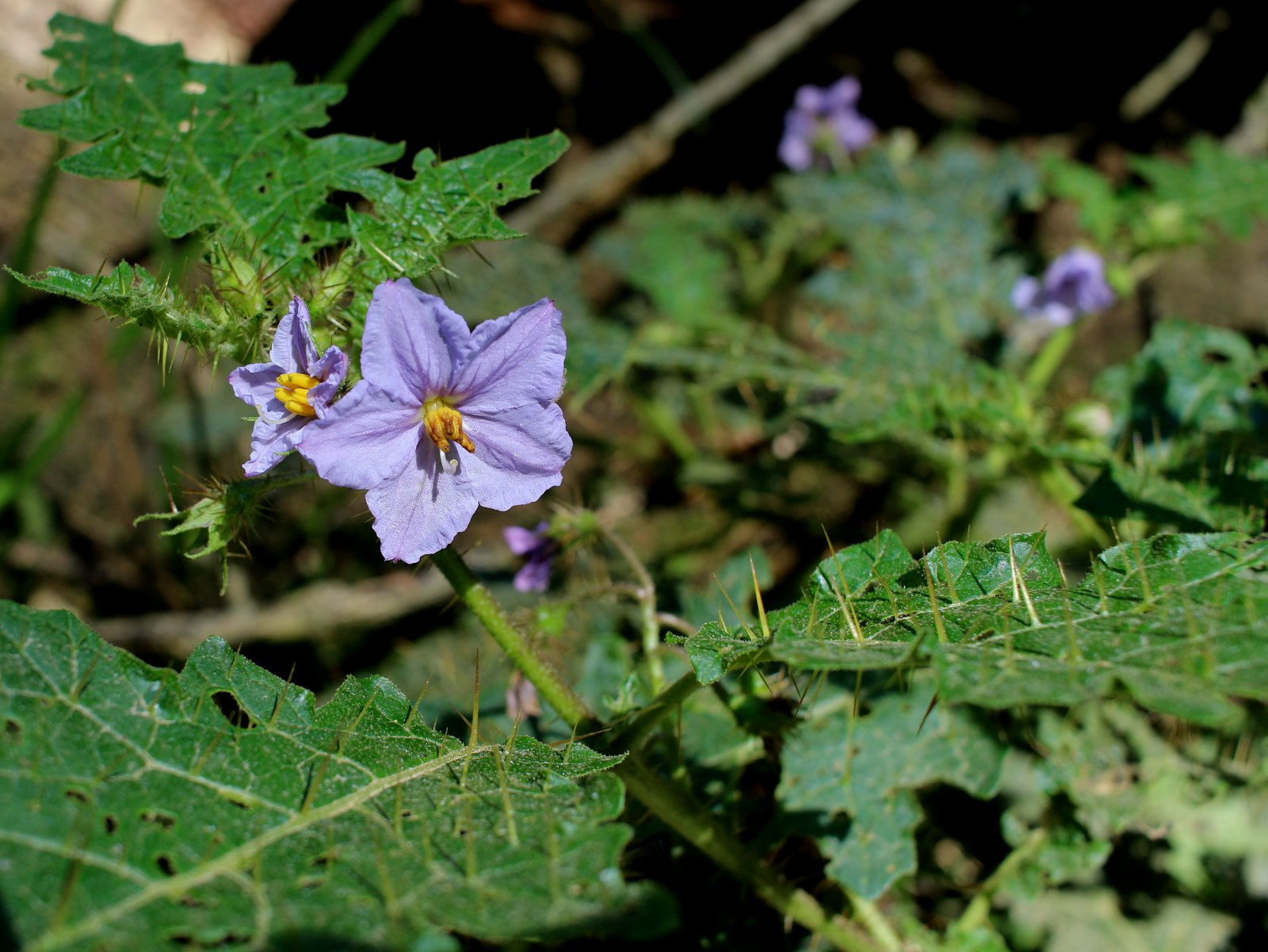
- Solanum ditrichum growing under a giant Ficus obliqua near the Allyn River

Scientific classification
- Kingdom: Plantae
- Clade: Tracheophytes
- Clade: Angiosperms
- Clade: Eudicots
- Clade: Asterids
- Order: Solanales
- Family: Solanaceae
- Genus: Solanum
- Species: S. ditrichum

Binomial name
- Solanum ditrichum A.R.Bean

= Solanum ditrichum =

Forest nightshade

Species of flowering plant

Solanum ditrichum, commonly called forest nightshade, is a low growing herbaceous perennial native to the east coast of Australia, found north of Dungog on the coast and tablelands.

Forest nightshade grows up to 60 cm high. Its leaves are 6 to 12 cm long and 4.5 to 9.5 cm wide. Much of the plant is spiky. Five petalled flowers occur at any time of the year and are blue or lilac in colour. The fruit size varies from 21 to 26 mm in diameter and the stem is around 16 mm long. The fruit is a berry, yellowish green or pale green, with streaks of purple or dark green. Seeds are pale yellow.

The habitat is moist areas, in sclerophyll forest, or disturbed areas in rainforest. This plant first appeared in scientific literature in 2004 in the journal Austrobaileya, from a sample collected near Grafton, published by Anthony Bean.
