= Guringay =

First Nations people from eastern Australia

Gringai otherwise known as Guringay, is the name for one of the Australian Aboriginal people who were recorded as inhabiting the area of the Williams River in eastern New South Wales, north of Sydney. They were united with the Worimi of the Port Stephens and Karuah River regions by a common language, strong ties of kinship and survived as skilled hunter–fisher–gatherers in family clans. They also shared a similar language and tradition with the Wonnarua people to the west.

== Country ==
The Gringai lived round the Williams River, Barrington tops, Dungog, Barrington and Gloucester area and traded with the Paterson River Aboriginals The centre of their territory is on the land where the modern town of Dungog (perhaps "clear hills" in the Gringai dialect) lies.

== History ==
From around 1815, cedar-getters entered the region, followed by wealthy colonists in the late 1820s taking up their land grants. With their convict labourers, they made their way up the river, displacing or killing the Gringai, with most survivors being forced into the margins of colonial society or into the upper reaches of the river. British settlements such as Raymond Terrace, Clarence Town and Dungog replaced the Indigenous communities.

By 1834 it was estimated that up to 500 Gringai people had perished since the onset of colonisation and that the survivors faced "certain annihilation".

Two people of the Gringai are known by that name as a result of their arrest and subsequent trials. Wong-ko-bi-kan (Jackey) and Charley were both arrested within a year or so of each other in the 1830s. He was judged guilty and sentenced to be transported to Tasmania for manslaughter after spearing John Flynn on 3 April 1834. Flynn died soon after. Flynn had been a member of an armed troop of nine settlers who went to the aborigines' camp at the Williams River at dawn to arrest some of them for culling sheep on their land. From another perspective, Wong-ko-bi-kan could be said to have been defending the native camp from armed intruders. Wong-ko-bi-kan's case elicited some sympathy from the presiding judge and several observers, because of the way the settlers had provocatively approached the native camp. Wong-ko-bi-kan died in his Tasmanian prison soon after, in October of that year.

Another Gringai, known only as Charley, was arrested in May 1835, soon after the incident with Wong-ko-bi-kan. In August of that year, he was deemed partially responsible for the death of five convict shepherds working for Robert Mackenzie, later premier of Queensland, at Rawden Vale, 26 miles west of Gloucester. (Note: In Upper Ghangat, 12 miles northeast of Gloucester, five convicts tending cattle had taken revenge on the local tribe by lacing damper with arsenic and giving it as a gift to the natives. Many warriors died. The area became anathema to the tribe, calling it Baal bora (apparently, "place to be shunned")) Though generally understood by Europeans as an act of warfare, the trial interpreter, Lancelot Threlkeld, stated that Charley had acted after an Englishman had stolen a tribal talisman, called a muramai, and that the victims cohabited with a native woman, to whom the sacred object was shown. For this reason he implemented tribal law after a decision had been taken to that end by the elders. After his sentence he was brought back to Dungog and hung publicly as a warning to other Gringai. Local historian Michael Williams comments that, "Charley, ... was both an enforcer of one law and the victim of the enforcement of another set of laws." One later story, recounted in 1922 in the Wingham Chronicle, suggests that a raiding party set out to enforce the verdict by hunting other Gringai, managing to round some up and push them all over a cliff at Barrington. (Note: a strong body of settlers from the Williams and Allen Rivers struck out to the north west, ascending the Williams and Chichester Rivers. They ascended the lofty Mackenzie Tableland and located the first body of fugitive natives camped on the northern face of the mountain on a narrow shelf above a gigantic cliff which overhung a "tangled mass of brush and vines. Silently and surely they laid their plans and long ere the dawn of day the sleeping camp was encircled from cliff edge to cliff edge. Day broke and the sleeping blacks arose. Then maddened with fear under the gunfire they broke hither and thither in vain attempts to escape. Then panic stricken they turned to the cliff edge and sprang into space and, so perished. At a small plain a mile west of the present Cobakh Station the Port Stephens men came into conflict with the remaining body of natives, but the fugitives broke and fled northwards to a little flat-on the Bowman River. Here the final tragedy occurred; a stand was made by the blacks, but in vain. Years afterwards their unburied skeletons could be seen. The law claimed yet another victim. A native was captured and executed at Dungog, near where the present Court House stands.")

Syphilis contracted from convicts, and other introduced diseases, took their toll. In 1847 alone, 30 Gringai children died of measles.

As British colonisation of the region consolidated, the Gringai became fringe dwellers, camping on the edges of towns such as Dungog and Gloucester where they fended for themselves, occasionally receiving hand-outs of food and blankets, or obtaining casual work.

Some Gringai identities such as "Doughboy Billy", "Brandy" and "Nancy Green" were designated as the so-called "King of their tribe" or "Last of their tribe". When they died most were buried at the "blacks' cemetery" on the Violet Hill property of the Abbott family behind the old rectory building on what is now the corner of Myles and Verge Streets in Dungog. The surviving younger generation of Gringai at this time were deemed a nuisance. Two young boys who were begging on Fosterton Road near Dungog were poisoned to death when they were given food deliberately laced with toxic substances. This event was not regarded as important enough for an enquiry.

With the creation of the New South Wales Aboriginal Protection Board in 1883, the lives of the surviving Gringai were placed under its control. An Aboriginal reserve was created at Barrington in 1884, but none were formed around the Williams River. Some Gringai in the Gloucester area were encouraged or forced onto this reserve which provided a basic level of shelter, food and education. However, the reserve was closed in 1907.

== Ceremonial life ==
Key rites in the ceremonial life of the Gringai and related tribes, such as the keeparra, were described by Walter John Enright and R.H. Mathews in the late 19th century who managed to obtain permission to view and record them from the last remnants of the tribe.

One of the Gringai Bora rings used in the initiation is reported to have been at Gresford. A karabari was reported as having been performed on the occasion of the appearance of a comet in the sky in 1845/1846.

== Some words ==
- wilhurgulla (place of little sticks)
- erringi ( black duck)
- monduk (fertility)

== Alternative names ==
- Goreenggai

== Sources ==
- Enright, Walter John (5 July 1899). "Initiation Ceremonies of the Aborigines of Port Stephens, N.S.W." (PDF). Journal and Proceedings of the Royal Society of New South Wales: 115–124.
- Fraser, John (1892). The Aborigines of New South Wales. Sydney: Charles Potter, Government Printer.
- Fullagar, Kate (2015). "From Pawns to Players: Rewriting the Lives of Three Indigenous Go-Betweens". In Jackson, Will; Manktelow, Emily (eds.). Subverting Empire: Deviance and Disorder in the British Colonial World. Springer. pp. 22–42. ISBN 978-1-137-46587-0.
- Guilford, Elizabeth (1966). "Cory, Edward Gostwyck (1797–1873)". Australian Dictionary of Biography. Vol. 1. Melbourne University Press.
- Harman, Kristyn (2012). Aboriginal Convicts. Sydney: NewSouth Publishing. ISBN 9781742233239.
- Mathews, R. H. (1896). "The Keeparra ceremony of initiation" (PDF). Royal Anthropological Institute Journal. 26: 320–340.
- Miller, James (1985). Korri a Will to Win. Angus & Robertson. ISBN 978-0-207-15065-4.
- "R. v. Jackey [1834]". Decisions of the Superior Courts of New South Wales.1788-1899. Macquarie University.
- Roginski, Alexandra (2015). The Hanged Man and the Body Thief: Finding Lives in a Museum Mystery. Monash University. ISBN 978-1-922-23566-4.
- "Summary of Tocal's history". Tocal Homestead. CB Alexander Foundation.
- Tindale, Norman Barnett (1974). "Worimi (NSW)". Aboriginal Tribes of Australia: Their Terrain, Environmental Controls, Distribution, Limits, and Proper Names. Australian National University Press. ISBN 978-0-708-10741-6.
- W., J.E. (25 April 1922). "Peeps into the past: Berrico Public School. Aborigines". Wingham Chronicle. p. 2 – via Trove.
- Wafer, Jim (2014). "Placenames as a guide to language distribution in the Upper Hunter, and the landnám problem in Australian toponomastics". In Clark, Ian D.; Hercus, Luise; Kostanski, Laura (eds.). Indigenous and Minority Placenames Australian and International Perspectives. Australilan National University. pp. 57–82. ISBN 9781925021622. JSTOR j.ctt13www5z.7.
- Williams, Michael (2012). A History in Three Rivers: Dungog Shire Heritage Study (PDF). carste STUDIO. Archived from the original (PDF) on 29 March 2017.
