= Paterson River bridge, Vacy =

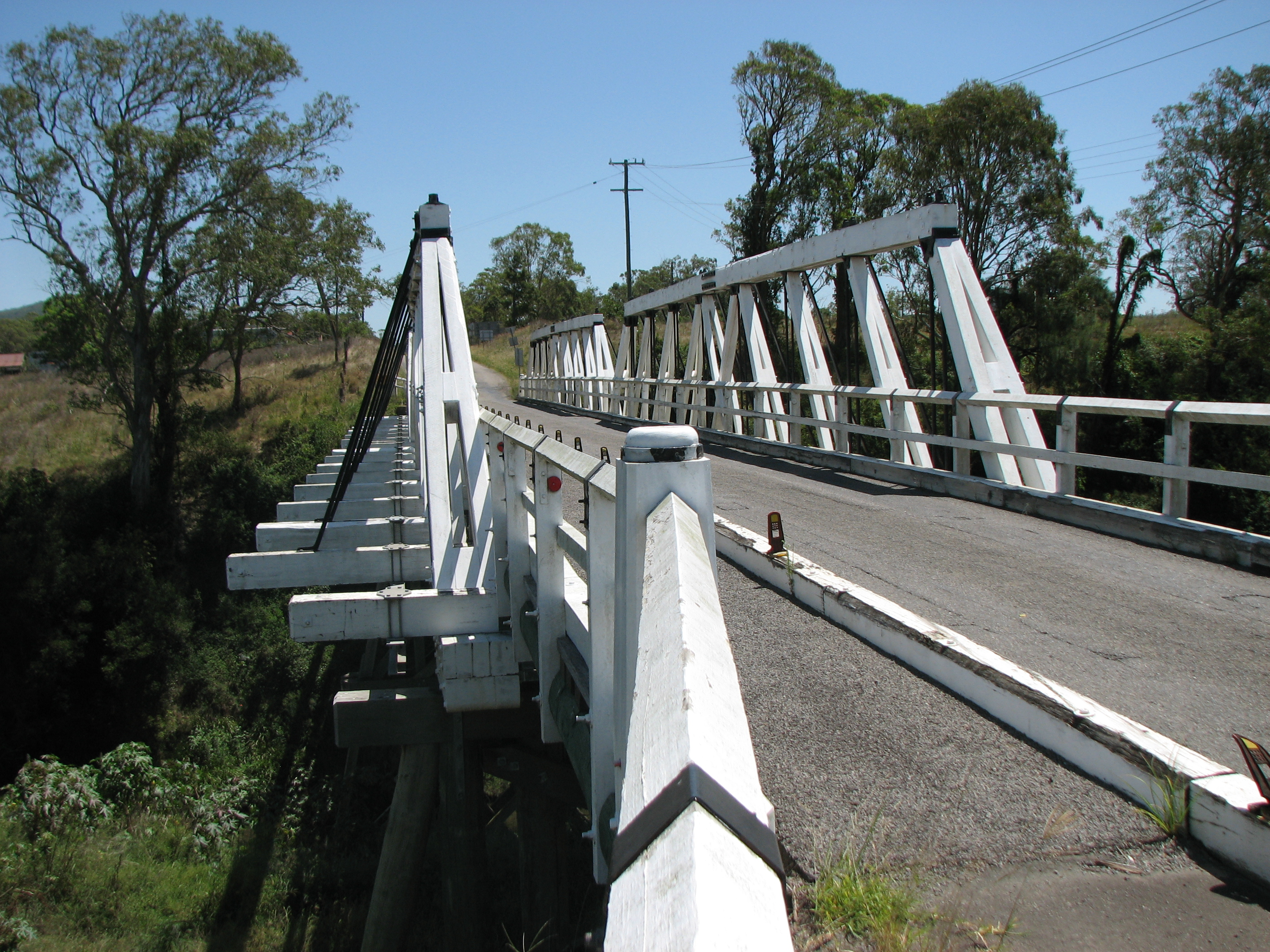
- Paterson River bridge, Vacy, New South Wales
- Coordinates: 32°32′15″S 151°34′34″E
- Carries: Gresford Road
- Crosses: Paterson River
- Locale: Vacy, New South Wales, Australia
- Other name(s): Vacy Bridge over Paterson River
- Owner: Transport for NSW

Characteristics
- Design: Allan truss
- Material: Timber
- Total length: 64.9 metres (213 ft)
- Width: 4.6 metres (15 ft)
- Longest span: 27.4 metres (90 ft)
- No. of spans: 2
- No. of lanes: One

History
- Engineering design by: Percy Allan
- Construction end: 1898
- Construction cost: A£1,750
- Replaces: Vacy Bridge (????-1896)

New South Wales Heritage Register
- Official name: Vacy Bridge over Paterson River; Paterson River bridge, Vacy
- Type: State heritage (built)
- Designated: 20 June 2000
- Reference no.: 1483
- Type: Road Bridge
- Category: Transport - Land
- Builders: Taylor and Littleproud

The Paterson River bridge, Vacy is a heritage-listed road bridge that carries Gresford Road across the Paterson River located in Vacy, New South Wales, Australia. It is situated about 300 metres south of the junction of Gresford Road and Summer Hill Road. The bridge was designed by Percy Allan and built in 1888 by Taylor and Littleproud. The bridge is also known as the Vacy Bridge over Paterson River. The bridge is owned by Transport for NSW. It was added to the New South Wales State Heritage Register on 20 June 2000.

== History ==
=== Allan truss bridges ===
Timber truss road bridges have played a significant role in the expansion and improvement of the New South Wales road network. Prior to the bridges being built, river crossings were often dangerous in times of rain, which caused bulk freight movement to be prohibitively expensive for most agricultural and mining produce. Only the high priced wool clip of the time was able to carry the costs and inconvenience imposed by the generally inadequate river crossings that often existed prior to the trusses construction.

Timber truss bridges were preferred by the Public Works Department from the mid 19th to the early 20th century because they were relatively cheap to construct, and used mostly local materials. The financially troubled governments of the day applied pressure to the Public Works Department to produce as much road and bridge work for as little cost as possible, using local materials. This condition effectively prohibited the use of iron and steel, as these, prior to the construction of the steel works at Newcastle in the early 20th century, had to be imported from England.

Allan trusses were the first truly scientifically engineered timber truss bridges, and incorporate American design ideas for the first time. This is a reflection of the changing mindset of the NSW people, who were slowly accepting that American ideas could be as good as or better than European ones. The high quality and low cost of the Allan truss design entrenched the dominance of timber truss bridges for NSW roads for the next 30 years.

Percy Allan, the designer of Allan truss and other bridges, was a senior engineer of the Public Works Department, and a prominent figure in late 19th century NSW.

Timber truss bridges, and timber bridges generally were so common that NSW was known to travellers as the "timber bridge state".

=== The Vacy bridge ===
The current bridge at Vacy was built in 1898 after the previous bridge was destroyed by fire in late 1896. It was completed at an approximate cost of A£1,750.

== Description ==
The Vacy Bridge is an Allan-type timber truss road bridge. It has two timber truss spans, each of 27.4 metres (90 ft). There is a single timber approach span at one end and none at the other giving the bridge an overall length of 64.9 metres (213 ft).

The super structure is supported by timber trestles and provides a single-lane carriage way with a minimum width of 4.6 metres (15 ft). The guard rail is of timber post and rail construction and extends the full length of the bridge.

The bridge was reported to be in good condition as at 15 June 2005.

== Heritage listing ==
Completed in 1898, the Vacy bridge is an early example of an Allan type timber truss road bridge, and in 1998 was in good condition. As a timber truss road bridge, it has many associational links with important historical events, trends, and people, including the expansion of the road network and economic activity throughout NSW, and Percy Allan, the designer of this type of truss.

Allan trusses were third in the five-stage design evolution of NSW timber truss bridges, and were a major improvement over the McDonald trusses which preceded them. Allan trusses were 20% cheaper to build than McDonald trusses, could carry 50% more load, and were easier to maintain. The Vacy bridge is located in the Hunter Region, which has 15 historic bridges each constructed before 1905, and it gains heritage significance from its proximity to the high concentration of other historic bridges in the area. In 1998 there were 38 surviving Allan trusses in NSW of the 105 built, and 82 timber truss road bridges survive from the over 400 built.

The Vacy bridge is a representative example of Allan timber truss road bridges, and is assessed as being State significant, primarily on the basis of its technical and historical significance. The Vacy Bridge over Paterson River was listed on the New South Wales State Heritage Register on 20 June 2000 having satisfied the following criteria.

The place is important in demonstrating the course, or pattern, of cultural or natural history in New South Wales.

Through the bridge's association with the expansion of the NSW road network, its ability to demonstrate historically important concepts such as the gradual acceptance of NSW people of American design ideas, and its association with Percy Allan, it has historical significance.

The place is important in demonstrating aesthetic characteristics and/or a high degree of creative or technical achievement in New South Wales.

The bridge exhibits the technical excellence of its design, as all of the structural detail is clearly visible. In the context of its landscape it is visually attractive. As such, the bridge has a small amount of aesthetic significance.

The place has a strong or special association with a particular community or cultural group in New South Wales for social, cultural or spiritual reasons.

Timber truss bridges are prominent to road travellers, and NSW has in the past been referred to as the "timber truss bridge state". Through this, the complete set of bridges gain some social significance, as they could be said to be held in reasonable esteem by many travellers in NSW. The Vacy bridge is valued by the people of the Patterson and Vacy districts.

The place possesses uncommon, rare or endangered aspects of the cultural or natural history of New South Wales.

Rare; in 1998 there were 38 surviving Allan trusses in NSW of the 105 built, and 82 timber truss road bridges survive from the over 400 built.

The place is important in demonstrating the principal characteristics of a class of cultural or natural places/environments in New South Wales.

The bridge is representative of Allan truss bridges.

== See also ==
- List of bridges in Australia
