= Allyn River Member =

Geologic member in Australia

- Stratigraphic range: Viséan; ~346–330 Ma
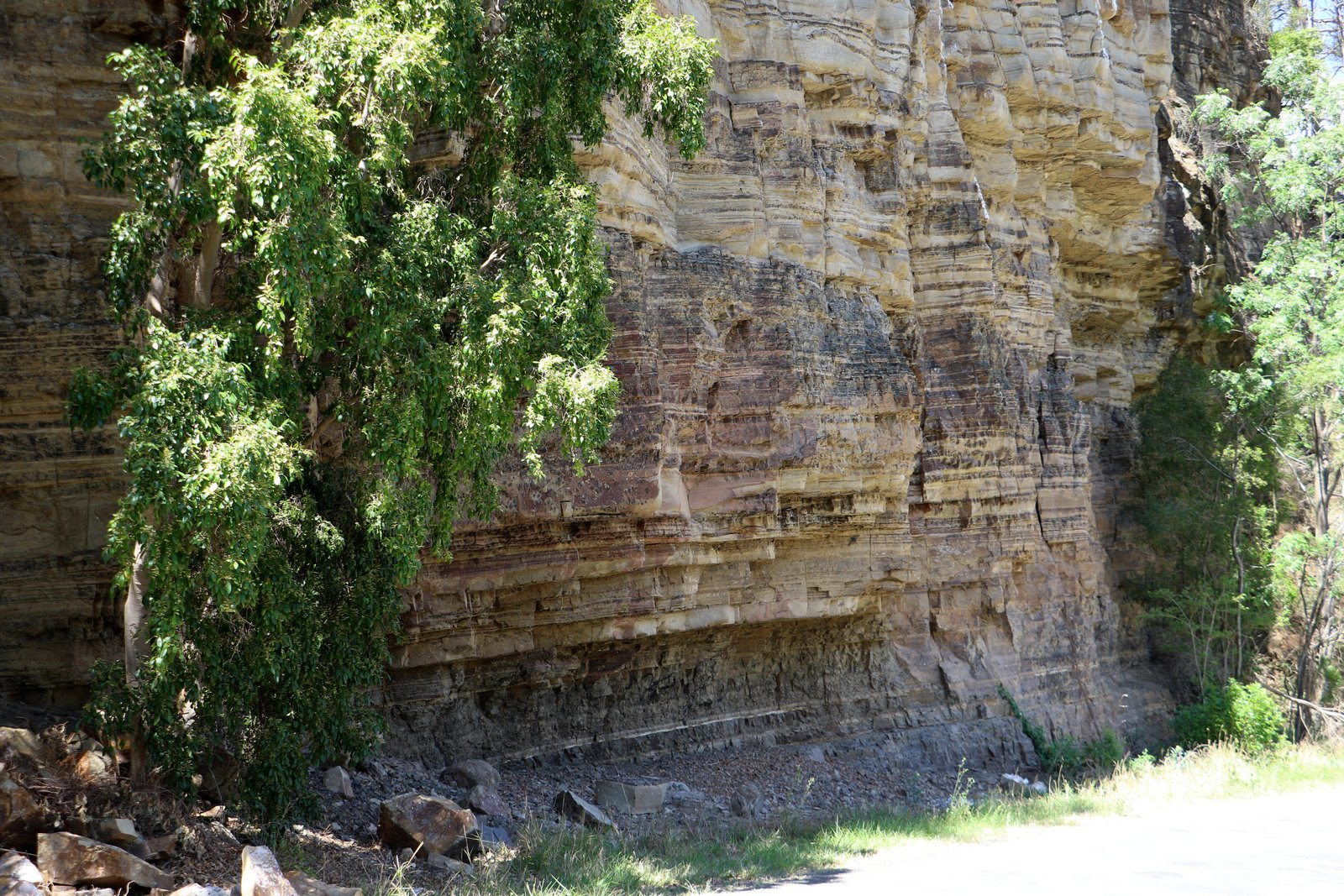
- A cliff above the Allyn River, Australia
- Type: Geological member
- Unit of: Flagstaff Formation, Australia
- Thickness: up to 1,000 metres (3,280 ft)

Lithology
- Primary: Sandstone, mudstone
- Other: Turbiditic sedimentary structures

Location
- Coordinates: 32.308110°S 151.514747°E
- Region: Hunter Valley
- Country: Australia

Type section
- Named for: Allyn River
- Named by: D.Lindley
- Year defined: 1988
- Region: New South Wales
- Country: Australia
- Thickness at type section: 740
- Allyn River Member (Australia) Allyn River Member (New South Wales)

The Allyn River Member is a geologic member in the New England Orogen in eastern Australia.

Seen in the Hunter River region near Dungog, this stratum is up to 1,000 metres thick, though 740 metres thick at its type locality. Formed in the Visean between 346.7 and 330.9 Ma., it is part of the Flagstaff Formation of sedimentary rocks.

This stratigraphic unit includes green to brown, medium thickly bedded lithic sandstone with turbiditic sedimentary structures and interbeds of brown thinly bedded mudstone.

== See also ==
- New England Orogen
