= Torryburn, New South Wales =

Torryburn is a small community located approximately 6 km south of East Gresford, New South Wales, Australia. Its main claim to fame is the property on Torryburn Road, now known as Torryburn Stud, which was at one time the home of Dorothea Mackellar, author of the Australian poem "My Country".

During the Hunter Valley floods of April 2015, the almost 100-year-old wooden Torryburn Bridge was washed away, leaving about 100 residents of the hamlet isolated for almost three weeks before a temporary footbridge was created across the Allyn River. The Dungog Shire subsequently created a temporary detour road; a replacement concrete bridge was completed eleven months later.

== Transport ==
There are approximately five buses every week in each direction. Buses depart at the corner of Torryburn Road and Gresford Road.
