= Paterson, New South Wales =

Paterson
- Town
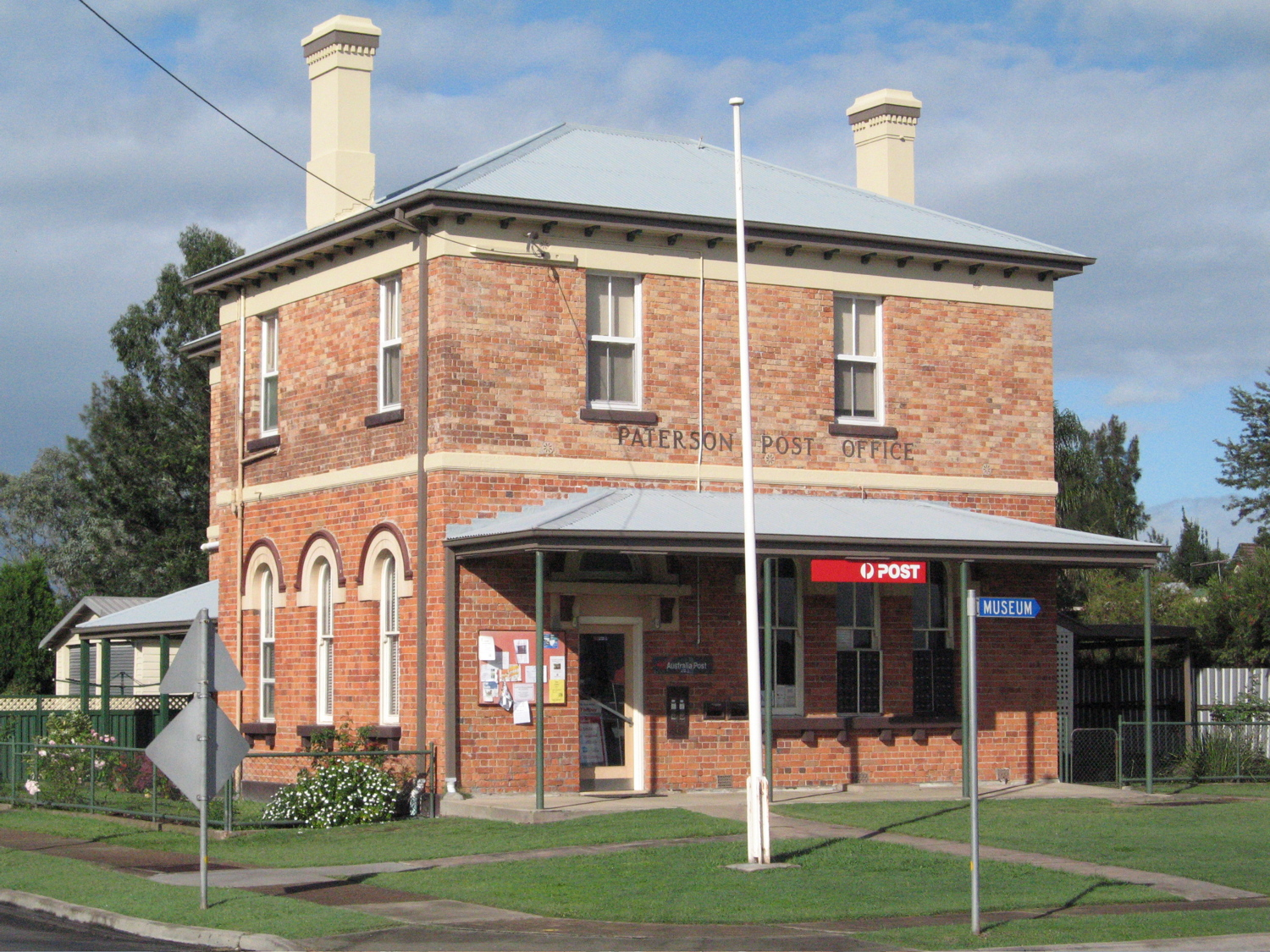
- Paterson Post Office on the corner of Duke and King Streets

- Coordinates: 32°35′S 151°36′E
- Country: Australia
- State: New South Wales
- LGAs: Dungog Shire; City of Maitland
- Location: 16 km (9.9 mi) N of Maitland; 25 km (16 mi) SSW of Dungog
- Established: 1833

Government
  - State electorate: Upper Hunter
  - Federal division: Paterson

Area
  - Total: 41.4 km^{2} (16.0 sq mi)
- Elevation: 30 m (98 ft)

Population
  - Total: 892 (2016 census)
  - Density: 21.55/km^{2} (55.80/sq mi)
- Postcode: 2421
- County: Durham
- Parish: Houghton
- Mean max temp: 23.9 °C (75.0 °F)
- Mean min temp: 11.9 °C (53.4 °F)
- Annual rainfall: 911.8 mm (35.90 in)
Localities around Paterson
Vacy	Martins Creek	Martins Creek
	Paterson	Duns Creek
Tocal	Duns Creek	Duns Creek

Paterson is a small township in the lower Hunter Region of New South Wales, Australia. Located within Dungog Shire and City of Maitland, it is situated on the Paterson River. It is in the middle of what was once dairy, timber and citrus country and is now more significantly a feeder town for the nearby mining industry in the Upper Hunter and the city of Newcastle. It was named after one of the first known Europeans in the area was Colonel William Paterson in 1801 surveyed the area beside the river.

== Geography ==
It is approximately 15 minutes drive north along either Tocal or Paterson Roads from the nearest major township of Maitland. Paterson railway station lies on the North Coast railway line between Sydney and Brisbane with daily services north to Dungog and south-east to Newcastle.

Adjoining areas include Duns Creek, Martins Creek and Vacy.

=== Climate ===
Climate data for Paterson (Tocal AWS) (1991–2020 normals, extremes 1967–present)
Month	Jan	Feb	Mar	Apr	May	Jun	Jul	Aug	Sep	Oct	Nov	Dec	Year
Record high °C (°F)	46.0 (114.8)	47.0 (116.6)	41.2 (106.2)	37.3 (99.1)	29.5 (85.1)	26.1 (79.0)	27.3 (81.1)	30.4 (86.7)	36.2 (97.2)	40.1 (104.2)	43.9 (111.0)	45.0 (113.0)	47.0 (116.6)
Mean daily maximum °C (°F)	30.6 (87.1)	29.5 (85.1)	27.4 (81.3)	24.5 (76.1)	21.0 (69.8)	18.0 (64.4)	17.8 (64.0)	19.8 (67.6)	23.0 (73.4)	25.7 (78.3)	27.3 (81.1)	29.1 (84.4)	24.5 (76.1)
Daily mean °C (°F)	24.3 (75.7)	23.6 (74.5)	21.7 (71.1)	18.5 (65.3)	15.3 (59.5)	12.9 (55.2)	12.1 (53.8)	13.3 (55.9)	16.1 (61.0)	18.7 (65.7)	20.8 (69.4)	22.8 (73.0)	18.3 (64.9)
Mean daily minimum °C (°F)	18.0 (64.4)	17.7 (63.9)	15.9 (60.6)	12.5 (54.5)	9.6 (49.3)	7.8 (46.0)	6.5 (43.7)	6.7 (44.1)	9.2 (48.6)	11.6 (52.9)	14.4 (57.9)	16.4 (61.5)	12.2 (54.0)
Record low °C (°F)	8.6 (47.5)	9.4 (48.9)	7.7 (45.9)	1.3 (34.3)	0.5 (32.9)	−0.3 (31.5)	−4.7 (23.5)	−1.5 (29.3)	−0.6 (30.9)	3.4 (38.1)	5.3 (41.5)	6.2 (43.2)	−4.7 (23.5)
Average precipitation mm (inches)	85.4 (3.36)	116.6 (4.59)	114.6 (4.51)	84.6 (3.33)	61.2 (2.41)	85.3 (3.36)	41.0 (1.61)	35.0 (1.38)	49.1 (1.93)	59.7 (2.35)	85.2 (3.35)	90.9 (3.58)	908.6 (35.77)
Average precipitation days (≥ 1 mm)	7.8	8.7	8.9	7.3	6.4	7.8	6.1	4.7	5.8	6.4	8.7	8.3	86.9
Average dew point °C (°F)	17.4 (63.3)	17.6 (63.7)	16.4 (61.5)	13.3 (55.9)	10.1 (50.2)	8.3 (46.9)	6.6 (43.9)	6.0 (42.8)	8.0 (46.4)	10.8 (51.4)	13.4 (56.1)	15.4 (59.7)	11.9 (53.4)
Source 1: National Oceanic and Atmospheric Administration
Source 2: Bureau of Meteorology

== History ==
The area was once occupied by the Wonnarua and Worimi peoples, who are Aboriginal Australian groups. The first official European in the area was the man whose name the town was to adopt, Colonel William Paterson, who, in 1801, surveyed the area beside the river that Governor King named in his honour.

As with so many colonial settlements, timbercutters, after local supplies of red cedar, followed in the footsteps of the explorers and surveyors. Indeed, the Hunter River, into which the Paterson River flows, was then known as the Cedar Arm due to the abundance of timber.

=== Early settlement of Patersons Plains ===
In 1812, four convicts (Swan, Pell, Davis and Swan) and John Tucker jnr were permitted by Governor Macquarie to commence farming on the Paterson River at "Patersons Plains", a location that came to be known as "Old Banks", as a special reward for supplying the Government with 500 cedar logs. Old Banks, in an area first surveyed by Henry Dangar in 1822–23, was the true genesis of rural settlement outside of the Sydney basin. It grew to eight farms along the river by 1818, six of them belonging to convicts. This fledgling farming community subsisted under the oversight of the locality's military station and lock-up established at the river's crossing point. Commandant Morrisett established (c.1818) the first Magistrate's Court above Newcastle in his Commandant's Cottage that he constructed at Old Banks on the farm of Pell (d.1815).

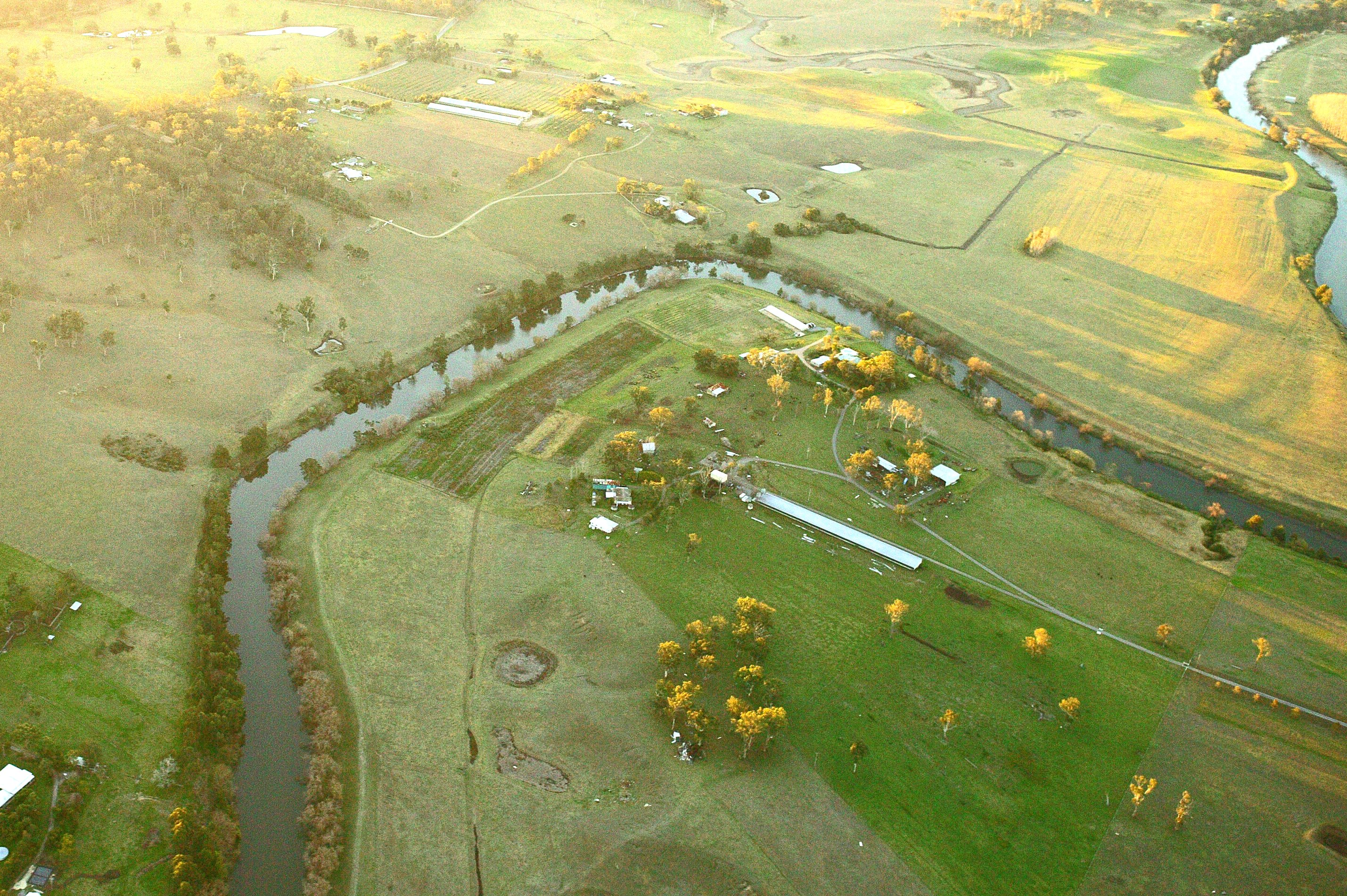
Old Banks near Paterson viewing North West toward Tocal. Davis, Pell and Swan farmed the far bank of the river while Tucker farmed the nearside.

However, from the early 1820s, the prominence of Old Banks as the Government's primary frontier seat of Government, and the 'original' Paterson, waned as a consequence of the establishment (from c.1818) and prolific growth of the Government's rural settlement and township at Wallis Plains (now East Maitland) ten kilometres to the south. With the construction of an overland route direct to north-western Sydney in 1823, Wallis Plains and the deep river port of Morpeth became the centre of the Lower Hunter Valley's connections with Sydney and the penal settlement at Newcastle. Even so, the military outpost at Old Banks (along with a similar facility 14 kilometres to the east at Seaham on the Williams River) continued to provide for the interception of escaped convicts from Port Macquarie, the imposition of law and order for the Paterson region and the oversight of a most important centre for transportation of goods, chattels and people.

The first land grant in the area was made to Captain William Dun in 1821 on land a few kilometres to the north of Old Banks. In 1822, when the area was formally opened up to settlement, James Webber established "Tocal" on his land grant immediately to the north-west of Swan's farm; Tocal to become among the most successful of the farming establishments on the lower Paterson River. In 1823, Morrisett's Government Cottage and associated infrastructure was made available to Timothy Nowlan as the base for his Government-sponsored sheep breeding 'experiment', and family home. A one-mile square area situated to the west of the river at Old Banks (and about 800m distant from the river and to the south of Tocal) was identified as a possible township by the early 1830s. However this was not developed in favour of the present township site.

=== Present township of Paterson ===
The present township of Paterson, situated six kilometres to the north of the original military station at Old Banks, was the third to be surveyed in the Hunter Valley after Newcastle and Maitland, but was not proclaimed until 1833. With the continuing settlement of the district, Paterson soon became an important tidal river port and service centre to the surrounding community. Many early settlers were Scots and hence a Presbyterian Church preceded an Anglican establishment. Indeed, St Ann's, opened in 1842, is said to be the oldest Presbyterian Church on mainland Australia. The river trade began to decline in the 1850s as the road to Maitland improved. Timber mills were established by the 1870s. In its heyday Paterson had four stores, five hotels, two shipyards, a sawmill, a tannery, four blacksmiths, two butchers, a bakery and a boarding school for girls. Shipbuilding also commenced with the development of the river trade and considerable supplies of tobacco were grown, as well as grains, grapes, wine, citrus fruits and cotton were transported by steamboats to Morpeth, Newcastle and Sydney.

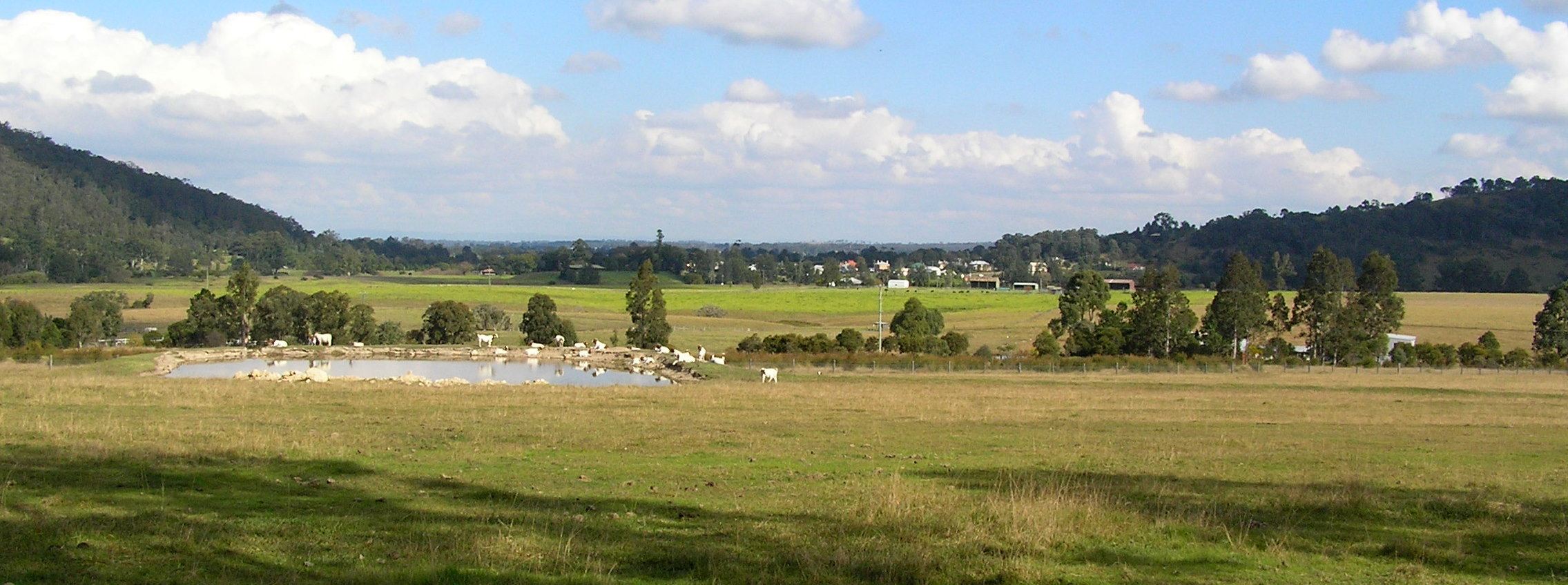
Viewing south to Paterson village. The rising ground to left and right forms the mouth of the Paterson Valley

By the time the railway arrived in 1911 the long-term decline of river transportation had taken its toll. With ironic symbolism the railway line passed directly over the wharf and a mishap during the construction of the railway bridge in 1909 sunk one of the local boats, the Anna Maria, which had been contracted to carry the BHP made girders. The boat was salvaged but was nearly destroyed again when a spark from a steam train set it ablaze. The last steam boats visited the area in the 1930s.

Throughout the 20th century agriculture has been the major source of local income. Citrus production was particularly strong at the turn of the century, with an estimated 30,000 cases being handled at the port each year.

At the 2006 census, Paterson had a population of 345 people.

== St Pauls Church ==
Before the church was built religious duties were done at home by George Augustus Middleton. In January 1836 local people raised money for the election of a church. On 26 October 1839 the town was appointed their first resident minister Rev. John Jennings Smith. Jennings-Smith erected a small stone building on Church land at the corner of King and Duke streets initially for a church and a school. In 1892 the large corner block was to Commercial Bank Co. in Sydney with the money used to build a parish hall. The church stated to be built and not complete until 1845.

== Heritage listings ==
Paterson has a number of heritage-listed sites, including:

- 18 King Street: Royal Oak Arms Hotel
- Tocal Road: Tocal Homestead
- 5 Webbers Creek Road: Rail Motor Society Collection

== Present day Paterson ==
There is an active historical society that maintains sites of historical importance in the area. The society has a museum collection in the Paterson Court House that is open once a week. The area is also serviced by Paterson Public School, and the local newsletter The Paterson "Psst".

During March, Paterson holds an annual festival at Tucker Park, with market stalls and local produce. The nearby Tocal Agricultural College holds a small farms Field Day on the first weekend in May, showcasing the college and local agricultural interests.

Paterson Classic Car show is held mid September with a mixed collection of vintage cars, trucks and bikes, with market stalls and live music throughout the day.

Also Paterson Gallery hosts a collection of talented local artworks available for purchase, celebrating an open night the first Friday of every month with an open invitation to all. The Rail Motor Society is located opposite Paterson railway station.

== Notable identities ==
- Bushranger Captain Thunderbolt's wife, Mary Ann Bugg (one of two known women bushrangers), was tried at the Paterson Court House during the 1860s.
