= Rail Motor Society =

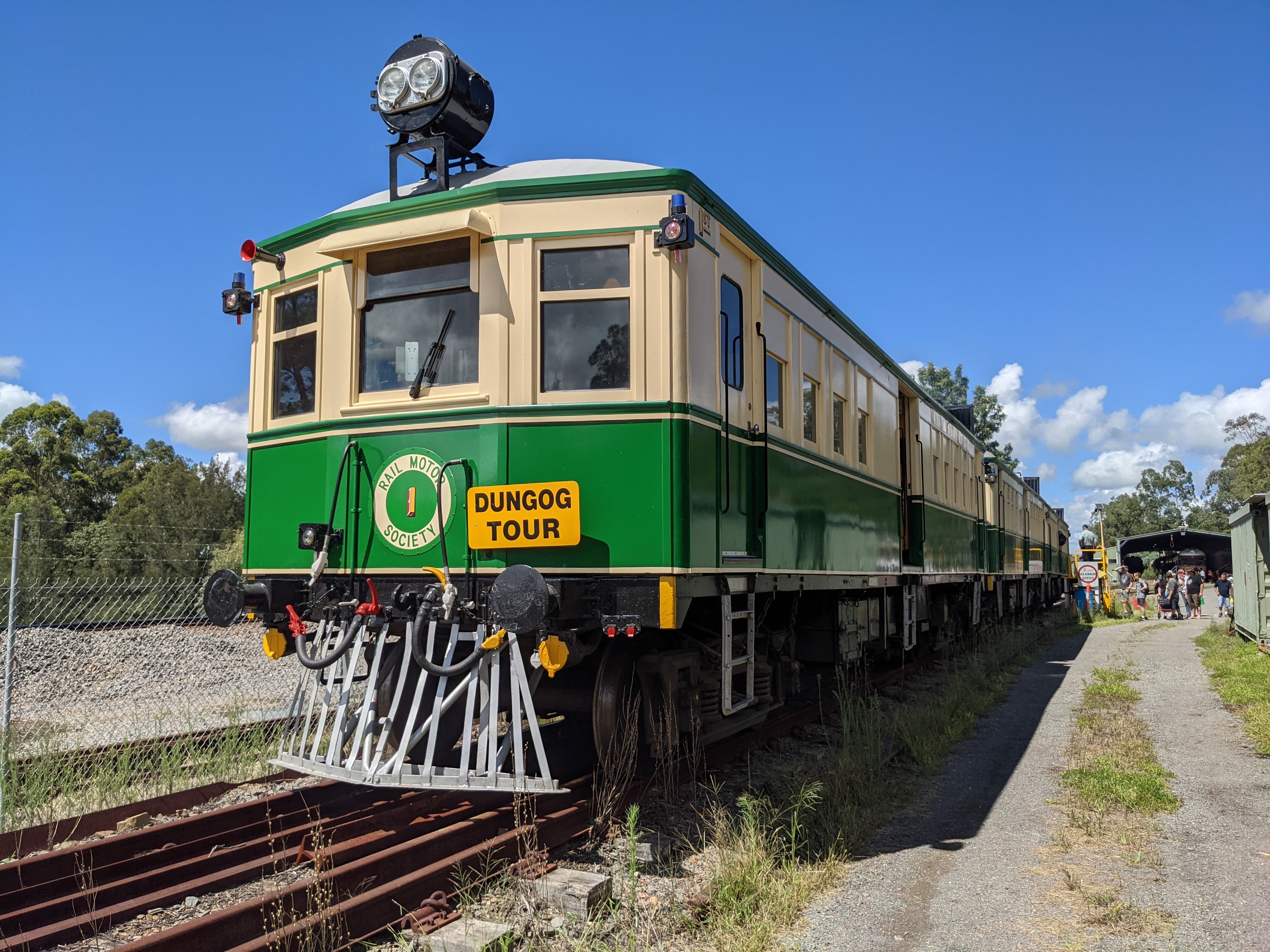
- Established: 1984
- Location: 5 Webbers Creek Road, Paterson, New South Wales, Australia
- Coordinates: 32.601304°S 151.615275°E
- Type: Railway museum
- Parking: On site and in adjoining streets
- Website: www.trms.org.au

The Rail Motor Society, based at Paterson, New South Wales, is a community owned collection of preserved self-propelled railway vehicles and equipment from the former New South Wales Government Railways and its successors. The items in its collection date from 1923 through to 1972.

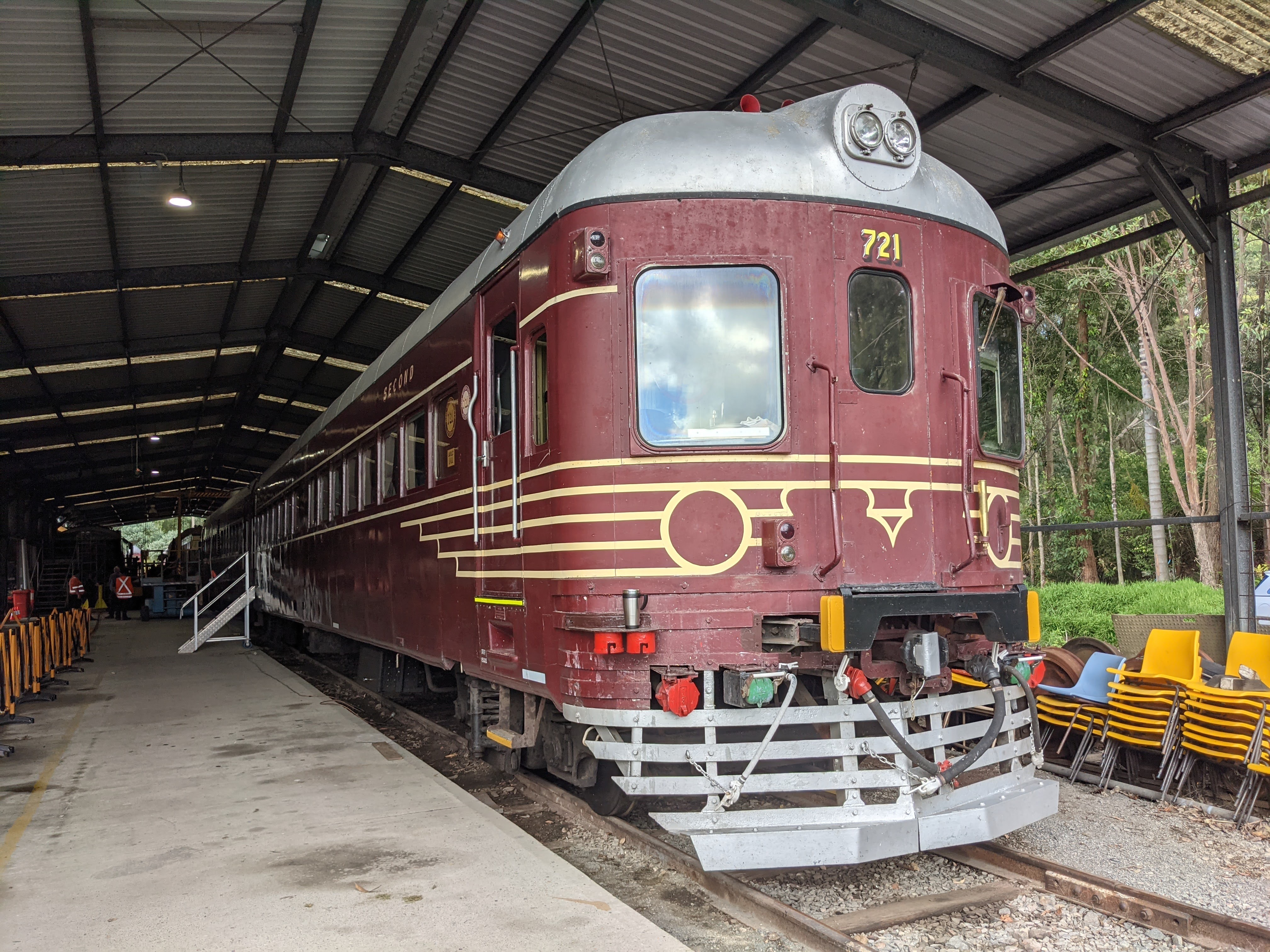
621/721

The Society was established in 1984 as a community based not-for-profit organisation and is registered with Australian Charities and Not-for-profits Commission (ACNC) as a charity. The Society's primary aim is to collect, preserve and operate a representative fleet of New South Wales Government Railways rail motors. The Society's sole focus was to be on self-propelled or diesel multiple unit rolling stock, a principle that it still adheres to today. The Society is accredited as a rail transport operator in New South Wales, Victoria, Queensland, the Australian Capital Territory and South Australia by the Office of the National Rail Safety Regulator (ONRSR).

== History ==
The Society's origins stem from the Newcastle Branch of the Australian Railway Historical Society (NSW Division) where a small group of members proposed a local organisation to preserve and operate some of the CPH rail motors that were planned for withdrawal at the end of 1983 by the State Rail Authority (SRA). The nucleus of the Society was established in 1984 with the support of four established heritage organisations – the NSW Division of the Australian Railway Historical Society, the New South Wales Rail Transport Museum, the Zig Zag Railway and the Sydney Tramway Museum. Each of these organisations purchased rail motors when they were offered for sale by the SRA and these were pooled to form the nucleus of the Society's fleet. A site for its base was identified in the old goods yard opposite Paterson railway station and a lease was negotiated for its use. The first rolling stock items were delivered to Paterson from Sydney on New Year's Eve of 1984.

The Rail Motor Society is run entirely by volunteers and funds its day-to-day activities, restorations and construction programs from the proceeds of its heritage train operations and donations from the public.

The Society's collection is listed on the NSW State Heritage Register and contains CPH 3, being the oldest surviving rail motor in NSW and the only operating 400 class rail motor (HPC 402). The 620/720 class rail cars NPF 621 and NTC 721 are part of RailCorp's core heritage fleet and are managed on behalf of Transport Heritage NSW by the Society under a custody arrangement. This set was originally built in 1961 to replace steam hauled suburban services in the Newcastle area and spent its entire working life based in Newcastle.

In October 1986, CPH 1 was returned to traffic painted in post-war cream and green livery. It was joined by CPH 7 in January 1987 and together these have toured NSW and beyond extensively. In July 2011 they were joined by CPH 3.

In August 1986, HPC 402 was leased back to the State Rail Authority and after an overhaul used as a radio system test unit operating across NSW. Initially leased for six months, it would not be until July 2000 that it returned to the Society after travelling some 200,000 km. It has continued to see regular main line use, often being hired by rail network owners for radio testing and for infrastructure and executive inspections. Since 2000, it has performed numerous rounds of these operational activities. Recent operations include testing interfaces for Sydney Trains Digital Train Radio System (DTRS), ARTC executive inspections and in 2013 route training for the newly standardised North East main line and the Benalla to Oaklands line in Victoria.

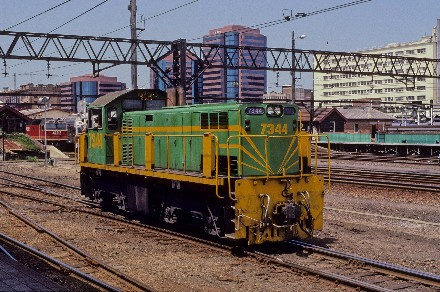
7344 shunts at Sydney Central in October 1991 painted in experimental FreightCorp green livery

In 2018, the Society became the custodian of former NSW Government Railways (and 3801 Limited's) 73 Class shunting locomotive, 7344, under a custody agreement with Transport Heritage NSW. Like 621/721, 7344 is part of the RailCorp heritage fleet. 7344 was delivered to Paterson on 28 December 2018. In Society service, 7344 has been returned to its original Indian Red colour scheme.

42-Foot Rail Motor Trailer CTC 51 is currently under restoration to operational service by the Society, while 600/700 Class vehicles 602 and 707 are in the early stages of restoration.

In June 2023, the Society purchased 620 Class rail car 629/729 from a private source. It is planned that 629/729 will be returned to operational condition for mainline service.

== Depot and Museum ==
The Society's Depot and Museum is situated in the old Goods Yard adjacent to Paterson Railway Station. This one hectare site is located on the north-western side of the North Coast Railway Line, 213 kilometres north of Sydney and 20 kilometres north of Maitland. The site houses the Society's rail motor fleet, a large three-road storage shed, maintenance facilities and the old station Master's cottage. The cottage houses a small museum with a collection of railway memorabilia. Member facilities are provided in two carriages (TAM 503 and BR 1395) located on an isolated track segment. A former FreightCorp training car FZ 663 is used for a meal room and training facility. During 2017, the Depot facilities were expanded and improved with the construction of a 30-metre by 4-metre extension to the shed to create a weather-proof workshop. This work was funded by a NSW Heritage Grant. During 2020, the Depot site was increased in size with the inclusion of the abandoned ARTC siding located in the railway corridor adjacent to the eastern boundary.

== Heritage listing ==
The Society's own rolling stock collection – eleven of the current fourteen vehicles – was listed on the New South Wales State Heritage Register on 17 August 2001.

The heritage-listed vehicles consist of 42-Foot Rail Motors CPH No.1, No.3, No.7, No.14 and No.19, 42-Foot Rail Motor Trailer CTC No.51, 400 Class HPC 402, 500 Class Rail Motor Trailer FT 501, 600 Class Rail Motors WFP 602, FPH 606 and 700 Class Rail Motor Trailer CT 707.

Other units in the fleet, 620 Class 2-car diesel unit (621/721) and locomotive 7344, that are under operational management by the Society for Transport Heritage NSW, are also listed on the NSW State Heritage Inventory.

== Affiliations ==
Other societies and organisations with which the Rail Motor Society is affiliated include:-

- Australian Railway Historical Society (NSW Division)
- Australian Railway Monument
- Canberra Railway Museum
- Cooma Monaro Railway
- East Coast Heritage Rail
- Finley Pioneer Railway Station
- Goulburn Rail Heritage Centre
- Historic Electric Traction
- Oberon Tarana Heritage Railway
- Lachlan Valley Railway
- Lithgow State Mine Railway
- Regional Heritage Transport Association – Junee
- Royal Australian Historical Society
- Tenterfield Railway Station Preservation Society
- Transport Heritage NSW
- Wagga Wagga Rail Heritage
- Zig Zag Railway

== Rolling stock ==
Preserved Rolling Stock
Code	Number	Date	Description	Status	Reference
CPH	1	1926	42-Foot Rail Motor	Operational	Rail Motor, CPH 1
CPH	3	1923	42-Foot Rail Motor	Operational	Rail Motor, CPH 3
CPH	7	1924	42-Foot Rail Motor	Operational	Rail Motor, CPH 7
CPH	14	1925	42-Foot Rail Motor	Stored	Rail Motor, CPH 14
CPH	19	1926	42-Foot Rail Motor	Stored	Rail Motor, CPH 19
CTC	51	1926	42-Foot Rail Motor Trailer	Under restoration	Rail Motor Trailer, CTC 51
HPC	402	1938	400 Class Rail Motor	Operational	Rail Motor, HPC 402
FT	501	1938	500 Class Rail Motor Trailer	Stored	Rail Motor Trailer, FT 501
WFP	602	1949	600 Class Rail Motor	Under restoration	Rail Motor, WFP 602
FPH	606	1949	600 Class Rail Motor	Stored	Rail Motor, FPH 606
CT	707	1950	700 Class Rail Motor Trailer	Under restoration	Rail Motor Trailer, CT 707
NPF	621	1961	620 Class Rail Motor	Operational	Rail Motor, NPF 621
NPF	629	1963	620 Class Rail Motor	Under restoration
NTC	721	1961	720 Class Rail Motor Trailer	Operational	Rail Motor Trailer, NTC 721
NTC	729	1963	720 Class Rail Motor Trailer	Under restoration
	7344	1972	73 Class shunting locomotive	Operational	Locomotive 7344
