= Royal Oak Arms Hotel =

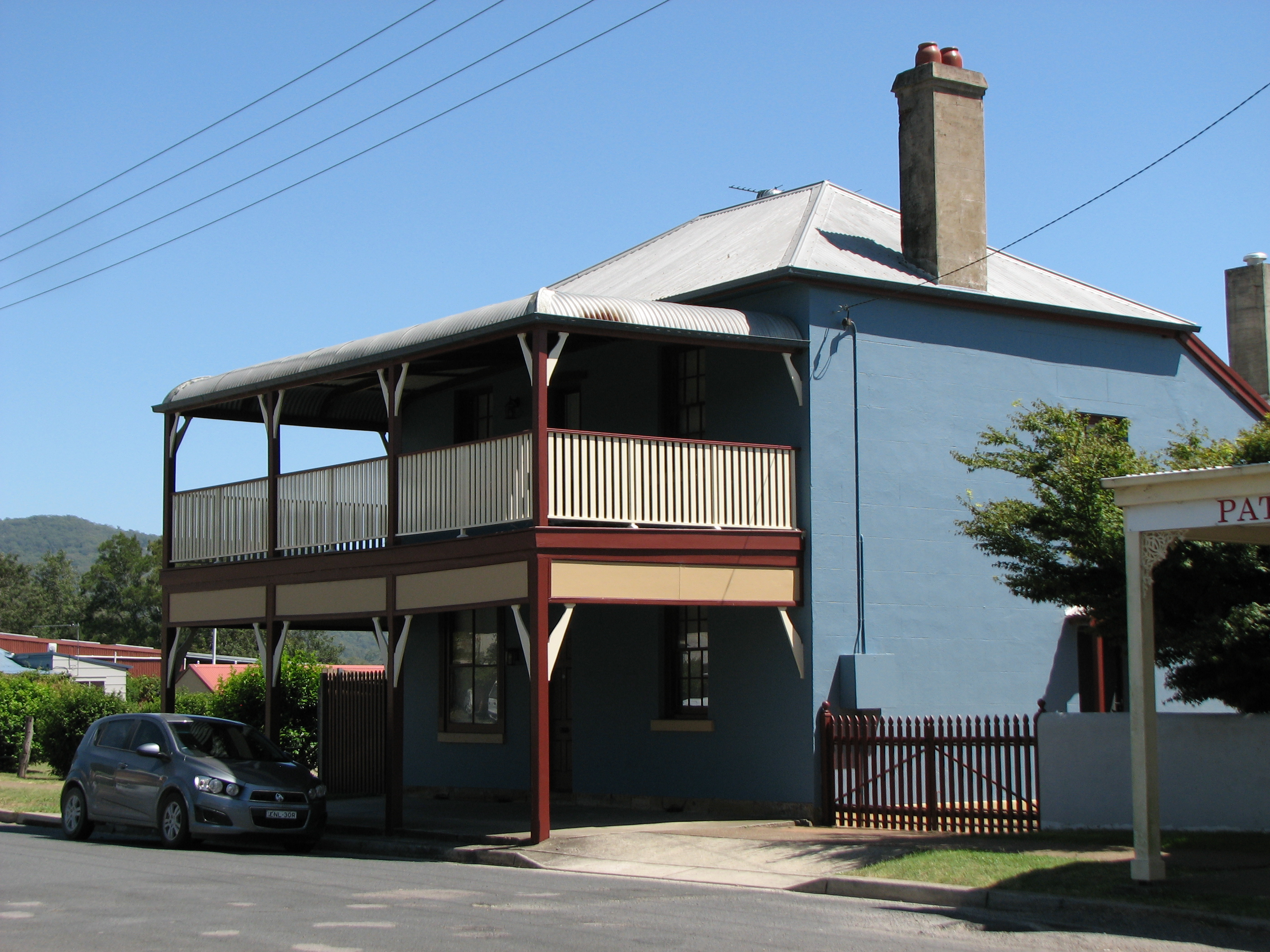
- Royal Oak Arms Hotel, Paterson, New South Wales

- Location within New South Wales Location within Australia
- 32.5988°S 151.6188°E
- Location: 18 King Street, Paterson, Dungog Shire, New South Wales, Australia

New South Wales Heritage Register
- Official name: Royal Oak Arms Hotel (former); Royal Oak Arms Hotel
- Type: state heritage (built)
- Designated: 2 April 1999
- Reference no.: 141
- Type: Hotel
- Category: Commercial

Royal Oak Arms Hotel is a heritage-listed former Australian pub, store and bank building at 18 King Street, Paterson, Dungog Shire, New South Wales, Australia. It was also known as the Royal Oak Inn. It was added to the New South Wales State Heritage Register on 2 April 1999.

== History ==
The exact date of the construction of the Royal Oak Inn remains unknown, however it is certain that it was built in the 1840s as a residence for Dr. Issac Scott Nind. Dr Nind was a surgeon stationed at Paterson to attend to convict gangs working in the area.

In 1853 William Morris Read purchased the property from Dr Nind and kept a wine and spirit store until his return to England in 1858.

Edward William Long bought the building in 1858, using it as a store until 1861, when he obtained a liquor license and began operating it as an inn, the 'Royal Oak'. He died in 1864. Daniel Long took over as licensee in 1865–66, Ellen Long in 1867 and Daniel Long again in 1868. An Elephannan Puxty was licensee from 1869 to 1877, George Seabrooke or Scabrooke from 1877 to 1879, and Thomas Swift from 1879 until 1881. The hotel was de-licensed in 1881, and the hotel contents were sold at auction in April 1882, as Swift was leaving the district.

From 1882 to 1902 the Commercial Banking Company of Sydney used the premises as a bank until in 1902 it moved into new premises across the street.

From 1902 to 1915 the premises were rented by Mr and Mrs Williamson who ran a small mixed business store including a barber, billiard room and refreshments.

William John McGill purchased the premises in 1915 and used the hotel as the family residence and the kitchen outbuildings as a butchering establishment. McGill had his brother in law Mr J. Thompson, a builder, demolish the front verandah and build the two storey verandah that still stands today. In 1930 William McGill died and left the property to his daughters.

Walter McGill purchased his brothers and two sister's share of the property and became the family home. The kitchen outbuildings continued to be used as a Butchers shop.

In 1968 Mr McGill subdived the allotments and sold the portion of land now known as Lot 55. The Royal Oak Arms Hotel was separated from the outbuildings.

Since 1968 the building has passed through a number of hands and has been uninhabited for the majority of that time.

In 1979 concerned for the lack of maintenance of the building, residents of Paterson requested the Heritage Council to take action under the Heritage Act to conserve the building. The action was also supported by the National Trust.

On 6 March 1981 a Permanent Conservation Order was placed over the Royal Oak Inn.

In 1987 through the Heritage Assistance Program funding was made available to assist in the restoration work being undertaken to the Royal Oak Inn. In 1994 the Heritage Council approved work for the restoration of the front verandah.

On 2 April 1999 the Royal Oak Inn was transferred to the State Heritage Register.

== Description ==
The Royal Oak Arms Inn is situated in what was once the busy commercial centre of the township of Paterson. It is a two-storey brick rendered building designed in the early Colonial Georgian style. Its original single-storey street verandah was replaced in the late 1900s with the two storey federation Style verandah that still stands today. A doorway was cut into the wall at the first floor to allow access onto the verandah.

The original timber shingles to the hipped and skillion roof have been overlaid with sheets of corrugated iron. The verandah addition is sheeted with corrugated iron and has a bull nose edge.

The original twelve paned windows were replaced with four pan windows before the turn of the century. The windows were shuttered. A number of the original elegant French doors to the ground floor rear verandah remain, however their shutters no longer exist.

The early twentieth century additions have altered the character of the building slightly but not adversely affected its appearance within the streetscape.

== Heritage listing ==
The Royal Oak Arms Inn is historically significant as a building that has stood for over 135 years within the centre of Paterson. The use of the building has changed to suit the needs of the town. The history of the building is strongly linked to the original settlement of Paterson and with its subsequent growth and development. It began as a residence for the convict surgeon, was used as an inn, hotel, bank, small store and residence as the township developed. The Royal Oak Arms Inn is significant as an example of early Georgian architecture within the townscape of Paterson. Located in a key position in the town of Paterson, the building forms a part of the townscape group with the hotel, Court House, Post Office and Church. It is an important element in the vista down Duke Street. The Royal Oak Arms Inn is socially significant as a landmark for the people and township of Paterson. It forms part of the image of Paterson, and image that lies with the original settlement and the growth that followed. The early twentieth century additions have altered the character of the building slightly but not adversely affected its appearance within the streetscape.

Royal Oak Arms Hotel was listed on the New South Wales State Heritage Register on 2 April 1999 having satisfied the following criteria.

The place is important in demonstrating the course, or pattern, of cultural or natural history in New South Wales.

The Royal Oak Arms Inn is historically significant as a building that has stood for over 135 years within the centre of Paterson. The use of the building has changed to suit the needs of the town. The history of the building is strongly linked to the original settlement of Paterson and with its subsequent growth and development. It began as a residence for the convict surgeon, was used as an inn, hotel, bank, small store and residence as the township developed. The Royal Oak Arms Inn is socially significant as a landmark for the people and township of Paterson. It forms part of the image of Paterson, and image that lies with the original settlement and the growth that followed.

The place is important in demonstrating aesthetic characteristics and/or a high degree of creative or technical achievement in New South Wales.

The Royal Oak Arms Inn is significant as an example of early Georgian architecture within the townscape of Paterson. Located in a key position in the town of Paterson, the building forms a part of the townscape group with the hotel, Court House, Post Office and Church. It is an important element in the vista down Duke Street.
