= Vacy, New South Wales =

Vacy
- Suburb
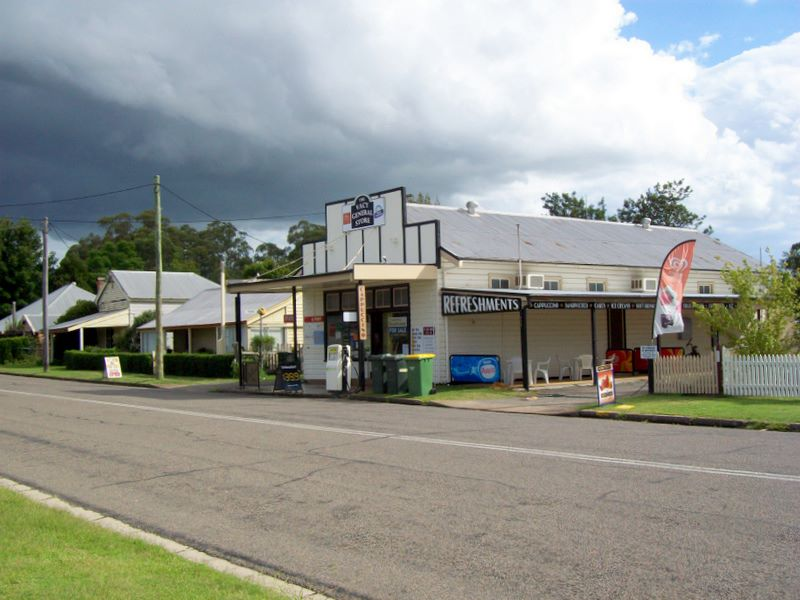
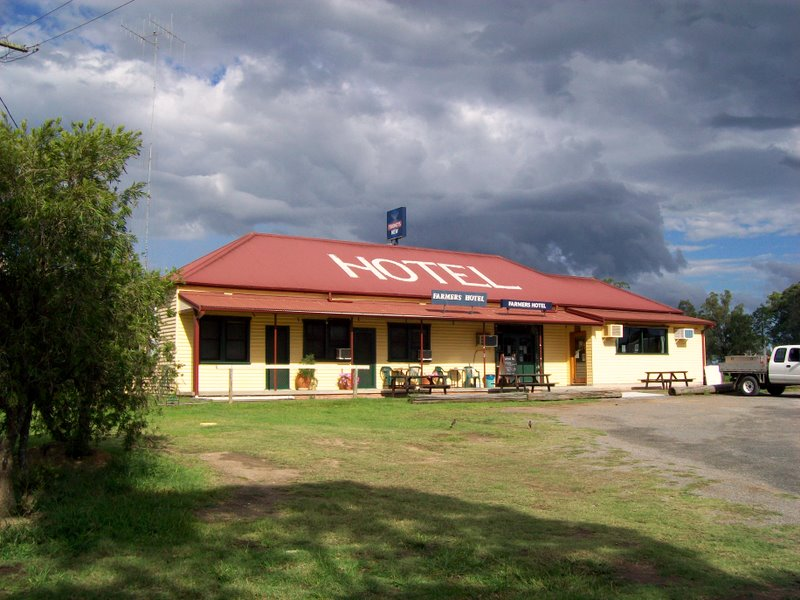
- General Store, Vacy Farmers Hotel, Vacy

- Coordinates: 32°31′53″S 151°34′8″E
- Country: Australia
- State: New South Wales
- Region: Hunter
- LGA: Dungog Shire
- Location: 189 km (117 mi) N of Sydney; 60 km (37 mi) NW of Newcastle; 30 km (19 mi) SW of Dungog
- Established: c. 1828

Government
  - State electorate: Upper Hunter
  - Federal division: Lyne

Area
  - Total: 59.5 km^{2} (23.0 sq mi)

Population
  - Total: 719 (SAL 2021)
  - Density: 9.2/km^{2} (24/sq mi)
- Time zone: UTC+10 (AEST)
  - Summer (DST): UTC+11 (AEDT)
- Postcode: 2421
- County: Durham
- Parish: Gresford

Vacy is a locality of the Dungog Shire local government area in the Hunter Region of New South Wales, Australia. Situated between Gresford and Paterson, it includes the village of Vacy, which was founded in the 1820s as a private town by John Cory, the owner of a large land grant. Vacy began to prosper in the 1850s and was a busy town by the 1870s. It remained a private town until it was sold in 1927 by the Cory family. The village is located at the junction of the Paterson and Allyn rivers. At the 2011 census, Vacy had a population of 547.

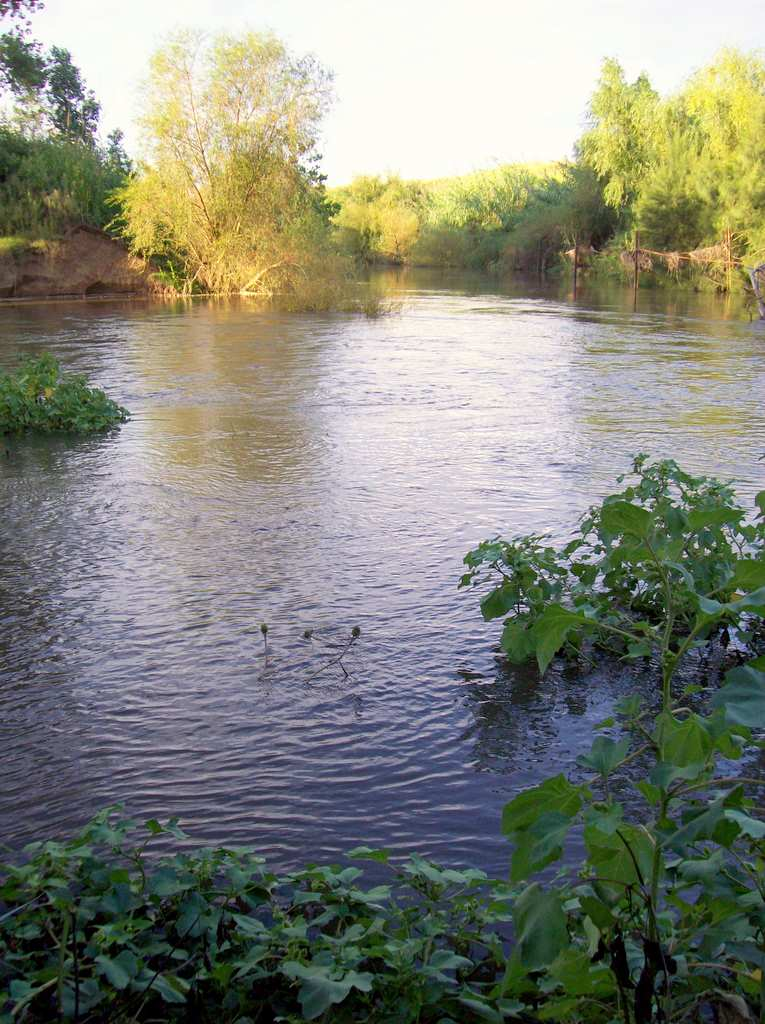
Paterson River at Vacy, joined by the Allyn River (top right)

Vacy includes a public school, general store, oval, school of arts hall, the Farmers Hotel, a motel, "Eaglereach" resort, a hairdressing salon, post office, cafe and a church.

Gilbert Cory, the son of John Cory developed the Vacy estate after his first marriage to Jeanette Rens. He lived there for the remainder of his life.

The rural nature of Vacy is demonstrated in the work of farmers managing beef cattle, dairy cattle, sheep, poultry and equine establishments, as well as other residents, retirees and working families with hobby farms and small acreages.

== Heritage listings ==
Vacy has a number of heritage-listed sites, including:

- 128 Main Road: Vacy Bridge over Paterson River

== Transport ==
There are approximately five buses every week in each direction. Buses depart at the general store.
