= Paterson railway station, New South Wales =

Railway station in New South Wales, Australia

Paterson
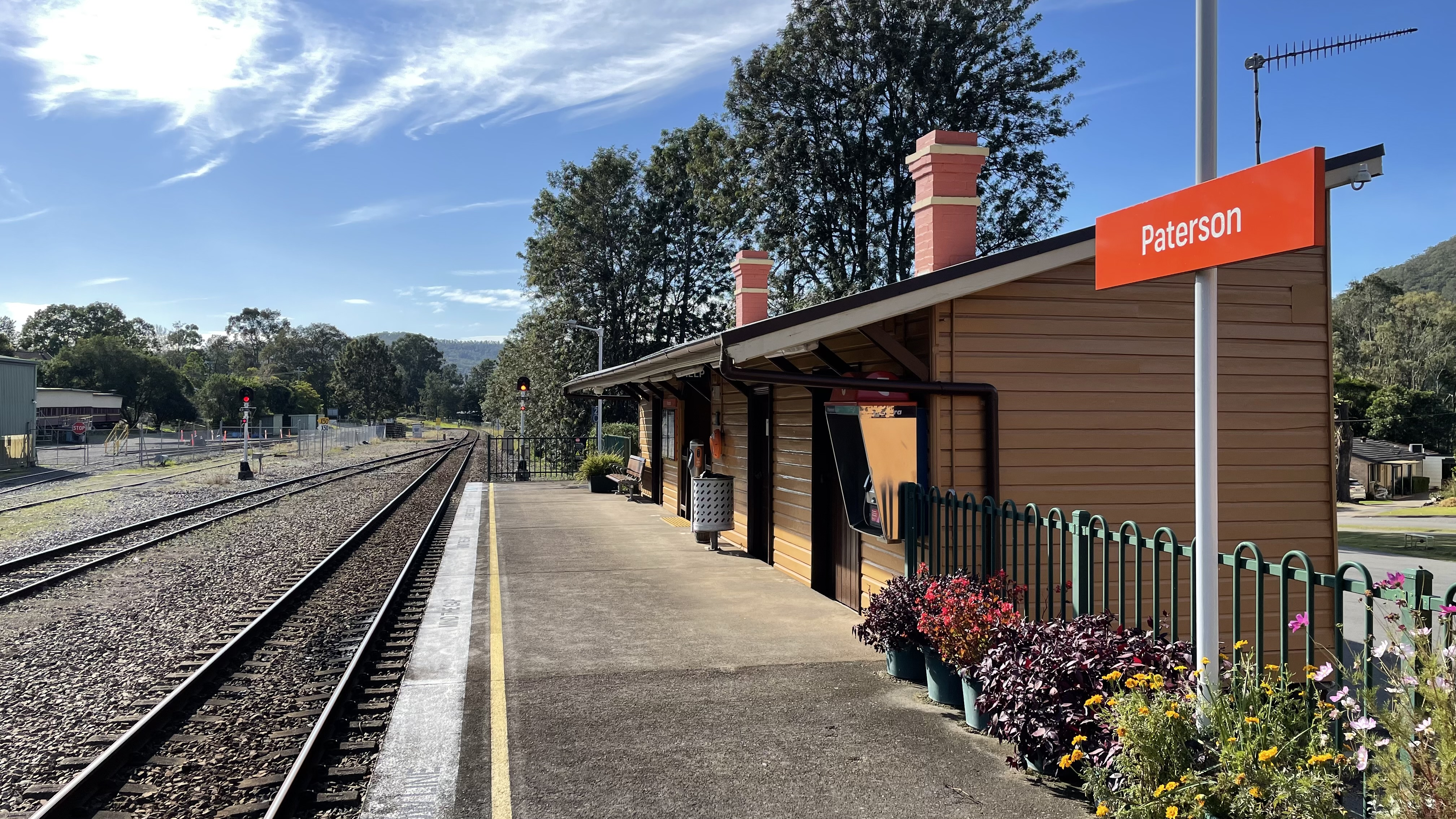
- North-east bound view from station platform, June 2024

General information
- Location: Railway Lane, Paterson; Australia
- Coordinates: 32°36′09″S 151°36′53″E
- Owner: Transport Asset Manager of New South Wales
- Operator: Sydney Trains
- Line: North Coast
- Distance: 213.22 km (132.49 mi) from Central
- Platforms: 1
- Tracks: 2
- Connections: Bus

Construction
- Structure type: Ground

Other information
- Station code: PTR
- Website: Transport for NSW

History
- Opened: 14 August 1911

Passengers
- 2025: 2,990 (year); 8 (daily) (Sydney Trains, NSW TrainLink)

Services
Preceding station	Intercity Trains	Following station
Martins Creek towards Dungog	Hunter Line	Mindaribba towards Newcastle Interchange
Martins Creek One-way operation	Hunter Line One weekday afternoon service	Telarah towards Newcastle Interchange
Location

Paterson railway station is located on the North Coast line in New South Wales, Australia. It serves the town of Paterson. It is serviced by Sydney Trains Hunter Line services travelling between Newcastle and Dungog. The station opened on 14 August 1911, and its original wooden station building is still in place.

== Platforms and services ==
Paterson station consists of a single platform. It is serviced by Sydney Trains Hunter Line services travelling between Newcastle and Dungog. There are five services in each direction on weekdays, with three on weekends and public holidays.

Opposite the platform is a 1,820 metre crossing loop. In the mid-1980s, the Rail Motor Society established its base on the site of the former freight yard opposite the station.

Platform	Line	Stopping pattern	Notes
1	HUN	services to Dungog & Newcastle (3–5 per day)	

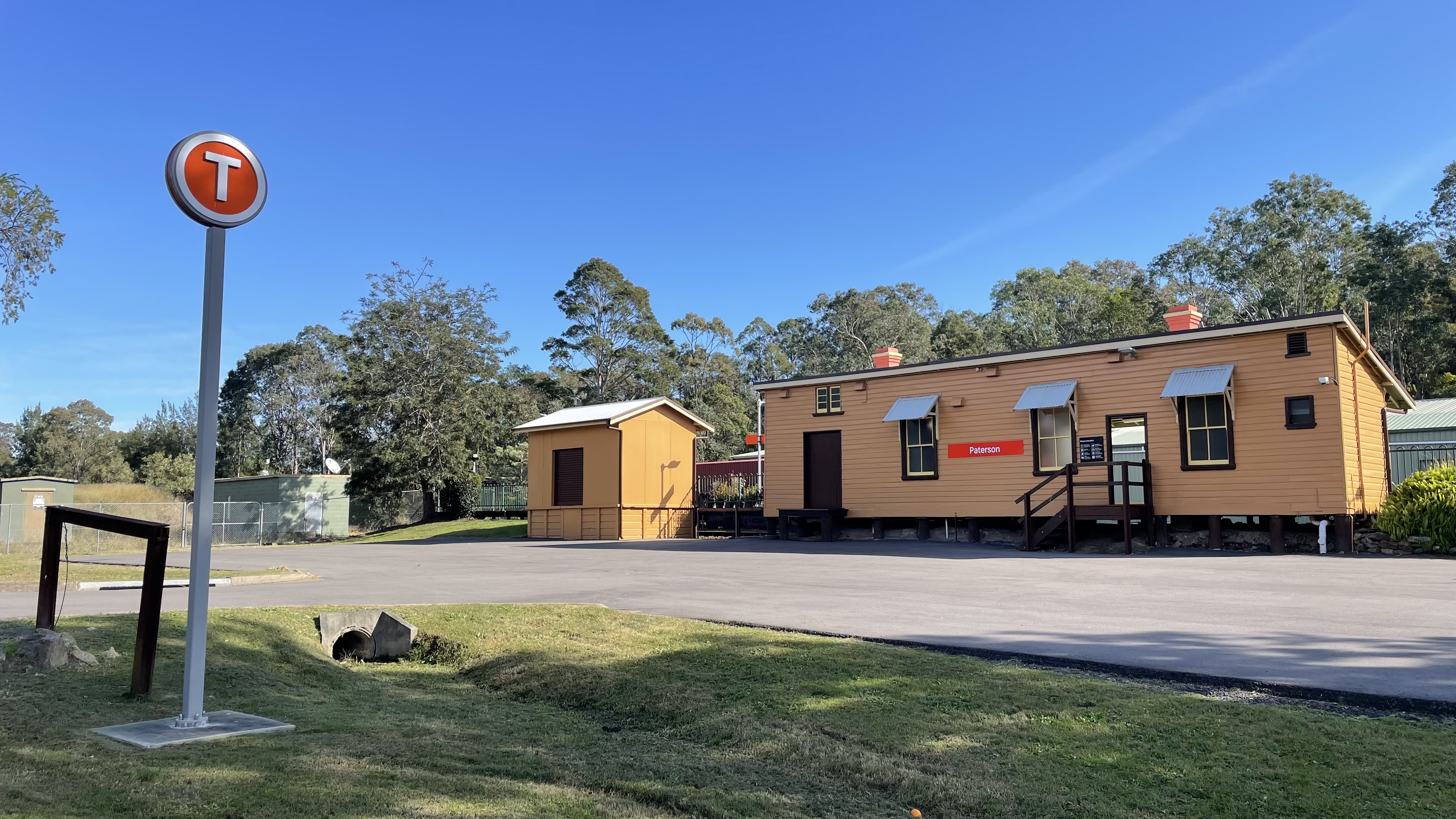
Platform buildings

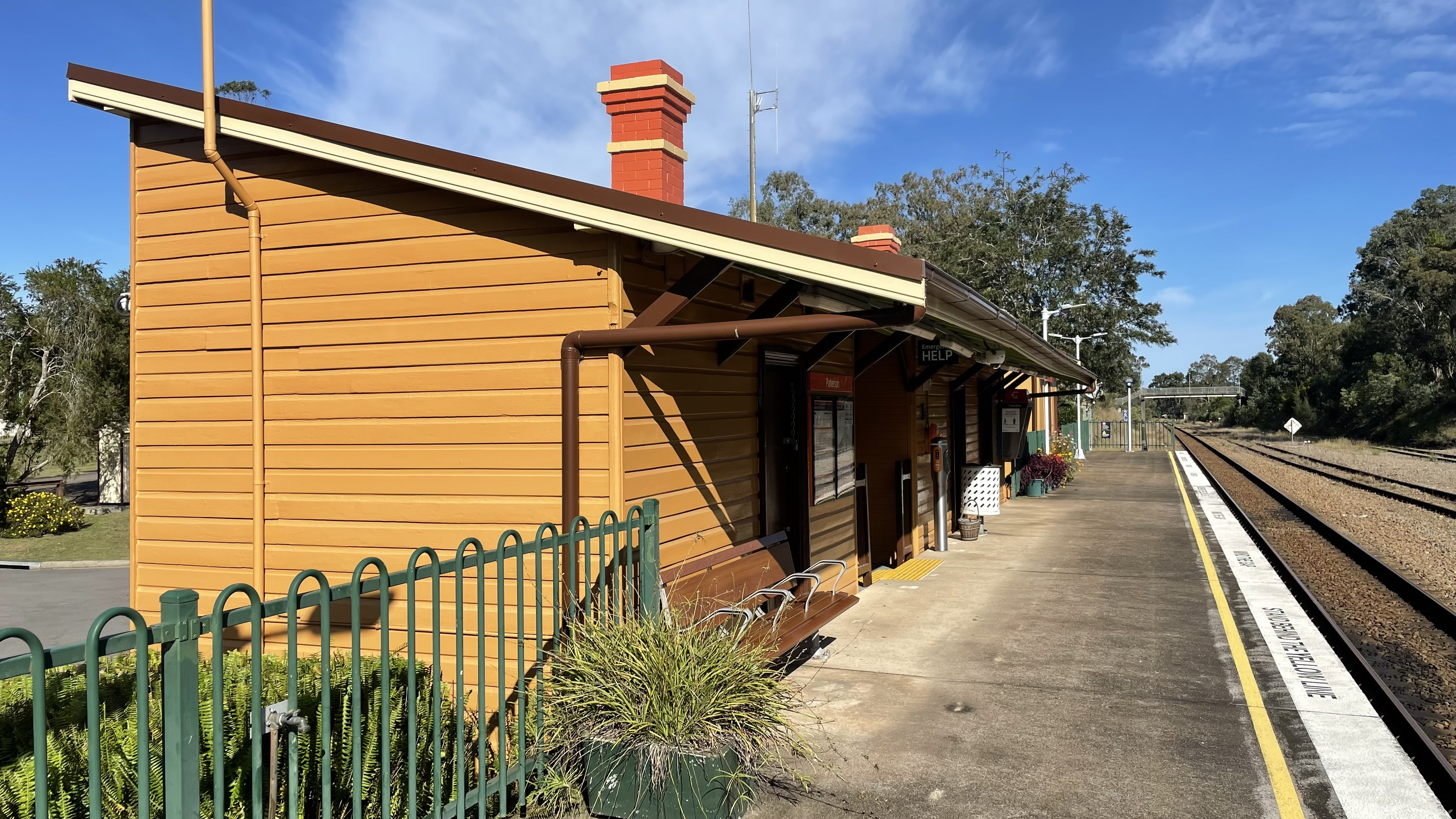
Southbound view on platform

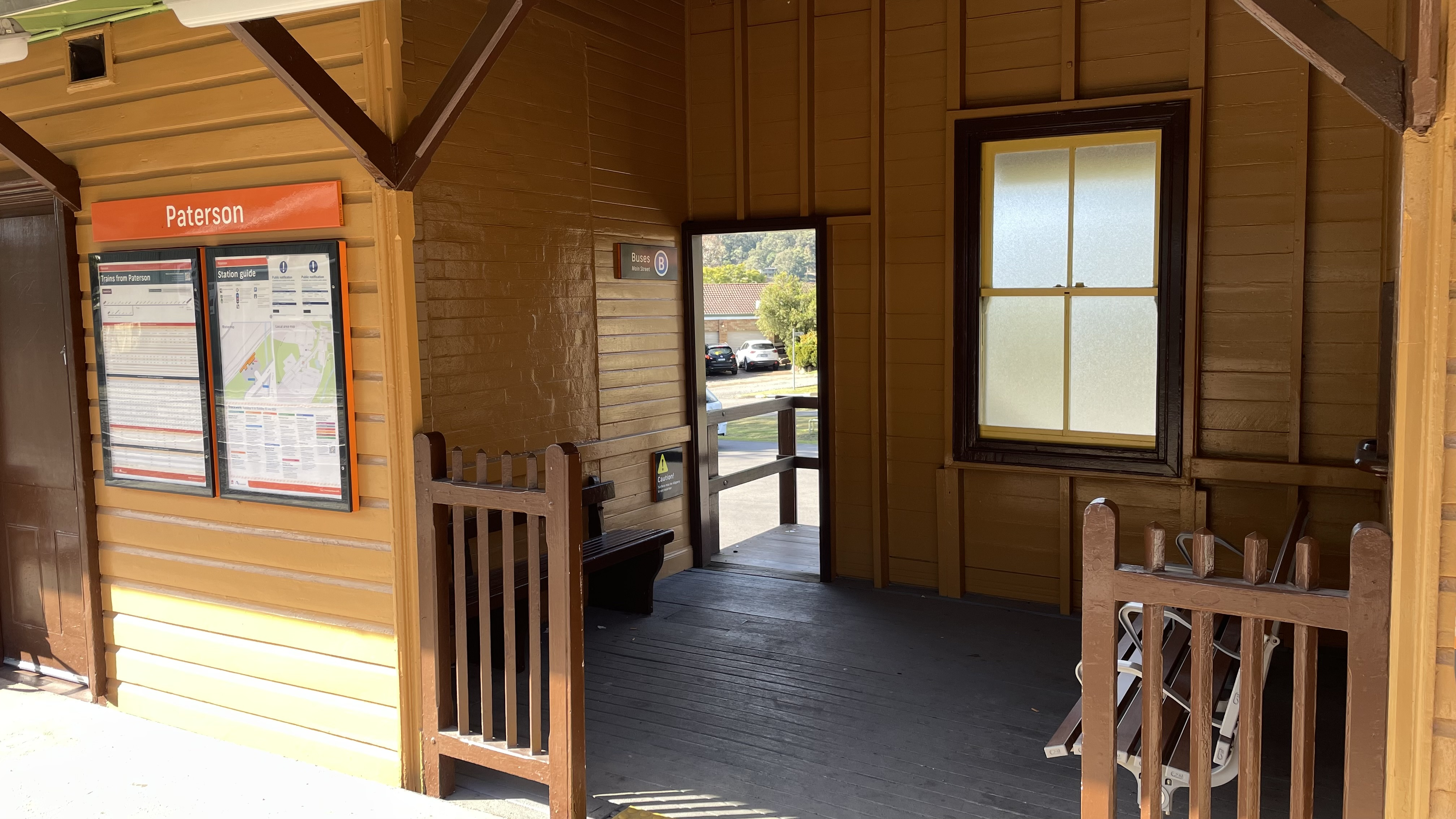
Covered waiting area

== Transport links ==
Hunter Valley Buses operates one bus route via Paterson station, under contract to Transport for NSW:

- 185: Largs to Maitland via Bolwarra & Lorn
