= Lostock Dam =

- Location of Lostock Dam in New South Wales
- Country: Australia
- Location: Hunter, New South Wales
- Coordinates: 32°18′54″S 151°27′04″E
- Purpose: Flood mitigation, hydro-power, irrigation, water supply and conservation
- Status: Operational
- Construction began: 1969
- Opening date: 1971
- Owner: State Water Corporation

Dam and spillways
- Type of dam: Embankment dam
- Impounds: Paterson River
- Height: 38 m (125 ft)
- Length: 701 m (2,300 ft)
- Elevation at crest: 92 m (302 ft)
- Dam volume: 623 m^{3} (22,000 cu ft)
- Spillways: 1
- Spillway type: Concrete lined, flip bucket chute spillway
- Spillway capacity: 2,860 m^{3}/s (101,000 cu ft/s)

Reservoir
- Creates: Lostock Dam
- Total capacity: 20,220 ML (714×10^{6} cu ft)
- Catchment area: 277 km^{2} (107 sq mi)
- Surface area: 220 ha (540 acres)
- Maximum water depth: 30 m (98 ft)
- Normal elevation: 155 m (509 ft) AHD

Power Station
- Operator: Delta Electricity
- Commission date: ~2010
- Type: Conventional
- Turbines: 2
- Installed capacity: 2 MW (2,700 hp); 1.92 MW (2,570 hp) (max. planned)
- Website; Lostock Dam

Lostock Dam is a minor rockfill and clay core embankment dam with a concrete lined, flip bucket spillway across the Paterson River upstream of the village of East Gresford in the Hunter region of New South Wales, Australia. The dam's purpose includes flood mitigation, irrigation, water supply and conservation. Mini hydro-power facilities were retrofitted in 2010. The impounded reservoir is also called Lostock Dam.

== Location and features ==
Commenced in 1969 and completed in 1971, the Lostock Dam is a minor dam on the Paterson River, a tributary of the Hunter River, and is located approximately 65 kilometres (40 mi) from both Maitland and Singleton, and also 93 kilometres (58 mi) north-west of Newcastle, on the upper reaches of the river. The dam was built by Dumez Australia under contract to the New South Wales Water Department of Land and Water Conservation following the drought of 1964–66. At that time there was a need for a water conservation storage in the Paterson Valley to stabilise and further develop rural productivity.

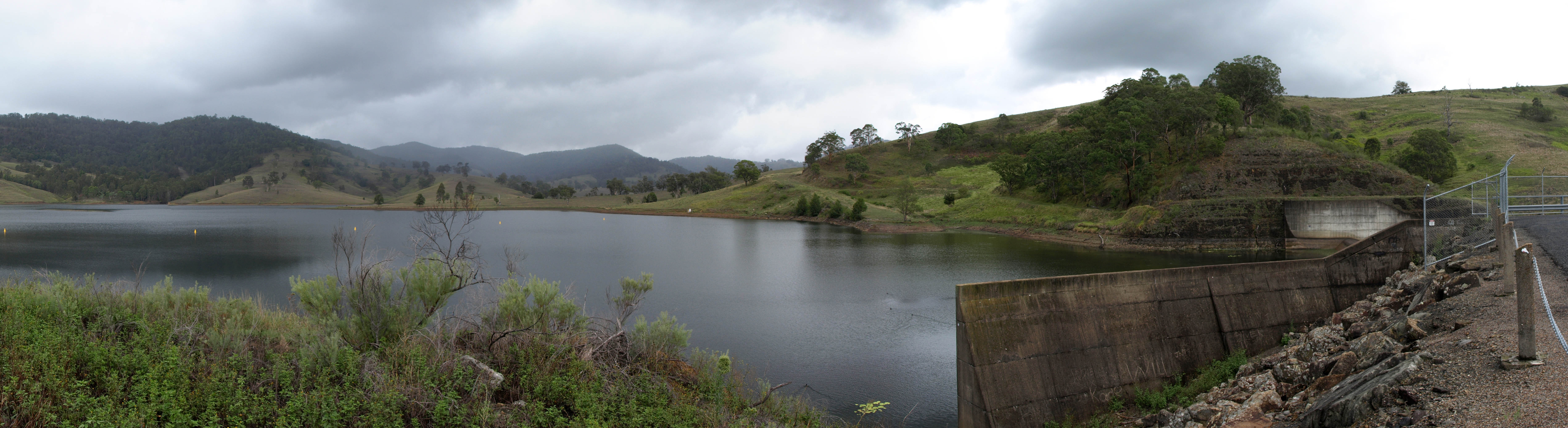

The dam wall height is 38 metres (125 ft) and is 701 metres (2,300 ft) long. The maximum water depth is 30 metres (98 ft) and at 100% capacity the dam wall holds back 20,220 megalitres (714×10^{6} cu ft) of water at 155 metres (509 ft) AHD. The surface area of the reservoir is 220 hectares (540 acres) and the catchment area is 277 square kilometres (107 sq mi). The ungated concrete lined, flip bucket chute spillway is capable of discharging 2,860 cubic metres per second (101,000 cu ft/s).

The name of the dam originates from the village of the same name, located approximately 2 kilometres (1.2 mi) downstream from the dam wall.

=== Power generation ===
A mini hydro-electric power station generates up to 2.2 megawatts (3,000 hp) of electricity from the flow of the water leaving Lostock Dam. Constructed by Heidemann Hydro Australia, the facility is managed by Delta Electricity.

== See also ==
- Delta Electricity
- Irrigation in Australia
- List of dams and reservoirs in New South Wales
