= The Wingham Chronicle =

Newspaper in New South Wales, Australia

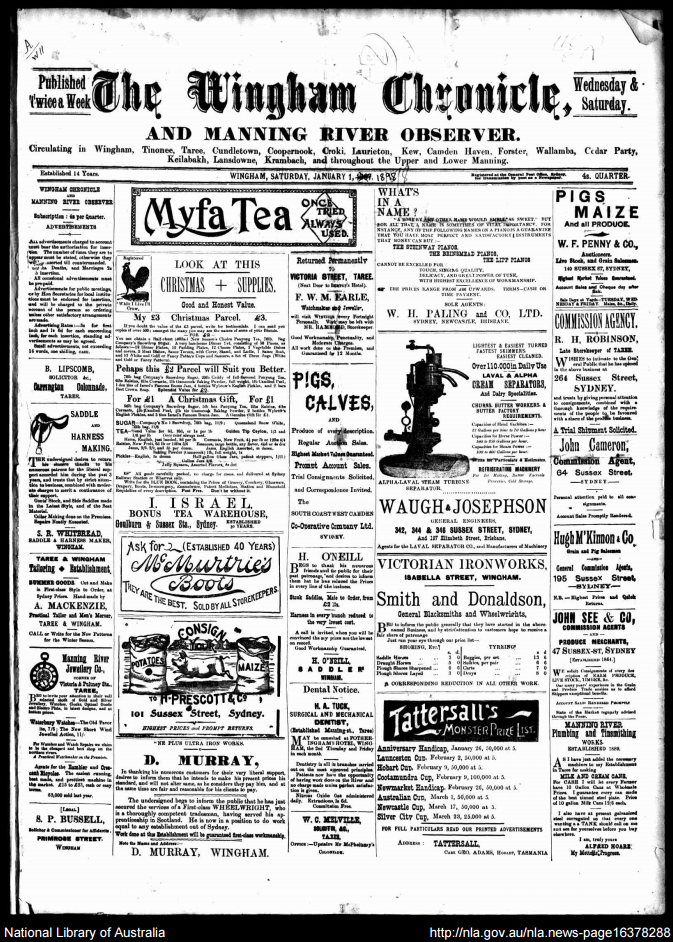
Front page of the Wingham Chronicle and Manning River Observer on 1 January 1898.

The Wingham Chronicle, previously published as The Wingham Chronicle and Manning River Observer, is a daily newspaper originally published in Wingham, New South Wales, Australia, now in Pyrmont, New South Wales by Fairfax Media.

== Newspaper history ==
The newspaper was founded in 1880 by Edward Rye Junior. It was originally issued weekly and became bi-weekly in February 1886. The title of the paper changed several times until May 1897 when it became The Wingham Chronicle and Manning River Observer, the title it retained until its initial closure in 1983. The newspaper's longest standing editor and proprietor was Frederick Arthur Fitzpatrick between the years 1916 and 1953. When Fitzpatrick retired he passed on the editorship to his son J.J. (Jack) Fitzpatrick who controlled the paper until approximately 1975. The newspaper closed in 1983, but was reopened by Consolidated Press on 1 October 1987 under the editorship of Lesley Joy Penfold, when it changed its title to The Wingham Chronicle .

A genuine paper besides being a vehicle for the dissemination of news throughout the district to which it is allied, should aspire to something higher. It should be an educator and should be able to place before its readers an intelligent outline of all 'matters that really matter' to the people. It should be able to fight, be prepared to censure friends when necessary, and applaud enemies when occasion demands.

— The Wingham Chronicle and Manning River Observer, 13 June 1933

== Digitisation ==
The paper is planned to be digitised as part of the Australian Newspapers Digitisation Program of the National Library of Australia.

== See also ==
- List of newspapers in Australia
- List of newspapers in New South Wales
