= Allyn River =

Allyn
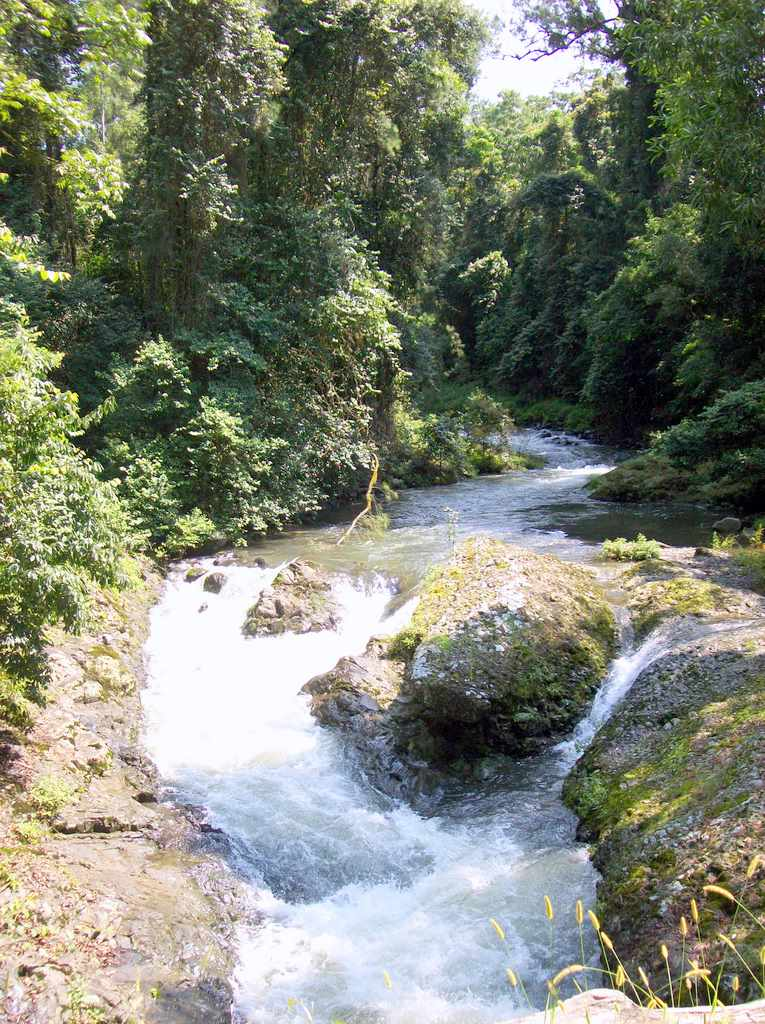
- Allyn River, surrounded by sub tropical rainforest

- Location of the Allyn River mouth in New South Wales

Location
- Country: Australia
- State: New South Wales
- Region: NSW North Coast (IBRA), Hunter
- LGA: Dungog
- Town: East Gresford

Physical characteristics
- Source: Allyn Range, Barrington Tops
  - location: near Careys Peak
  - coordinates: 32°21′42.9″S 151°31′55.668″E
  - elevation: 655 m (2,149 ft)
- Mouth: Paterson River
  - location: Vacy
  - coordinates: 32°3′43.26″S 151°24′57″E
  - elevation: 15 m (49 ft)
- Length: 82 km (51 mi)

Basin features
- River system: Hunter River catchment
- Tributaries
  - left: Chads Creek, Stony Creek (Dungog, New South Wales), Lewinsbrook Creek, McIntyre Creek, Mirari Creek
  - right: Masseys Creek, Bucks Creek

Allyn River, a perennial stream of the Hunter River catchment, is located in the Hunter region of New South Wales, Australia.

== Course ==
Allyn River rises on Allyn Range, on the slopes of the Gondwana Rainforests Barrington Tops, west of Careys Peak, and flows generally southeast, joined by seven minor tributaries, before reaching its confluence with the Paterson River near Vacy, descending 640 metres (2,100 ft) over its 82-kilometre (51 mi) course.

The course of the river flows through World Heritage listed high elevation rainforest, noted for its Antarctic beech; and then through lower elevation subtropical rainforest, including trees such as red cedar and small leaf fig. Some of the River Oak growing beside the stream are over 50 metres (160 ft) in height. Logging has been practiced in the area since the 1820s. In the middle course of the river, the geology includes sedimentary rocks such as the Allyn River Member.

== History ==
The Allyn River valley is the traditional territory of the Gringai clan of the Wonnarua people, a group of Aboriginal Australians.

== See also ==
- List of rivers of Australia
- Rivers of New South Wales
