= East Gresford, New South Wales =

East Gresford
- Town
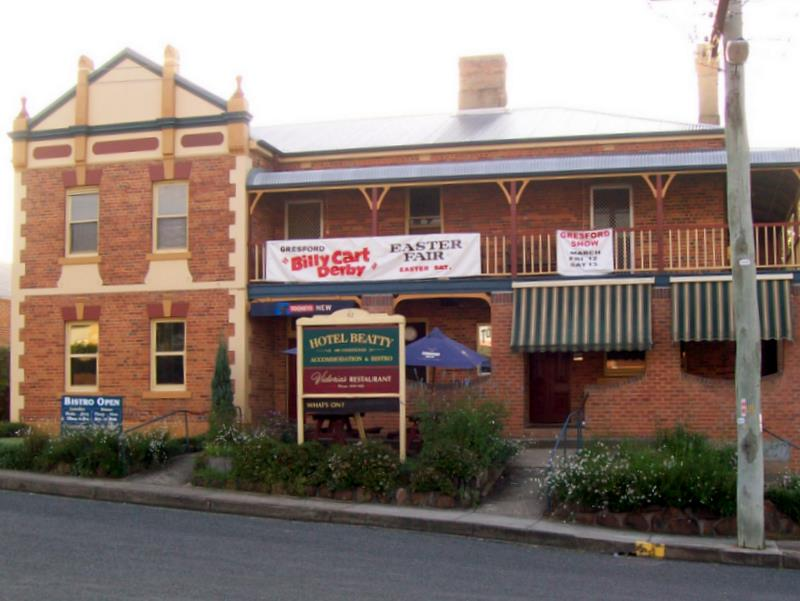
- Hotel Beatty, East Gresford

- Coordinates: 32°25′S 151°34′E
- Country: Australia
- State: New South Wales
- LGA: Dungog Shire
- Location: 192 km (119 mi) N of Sydney; 42 km (26 mi) NE of Singleton

Government
  - State electorate: Upper Hunter
  - Federal division: Lyne
- Elevation: 72 m (236 ft)

Population
  - Total: 289 (2006 census)
- Postcode: 2311
- Mean max temp: 23.3 °C (73.9 °F)
- Mean min temp: 12.1 °C (53.8 °F)
- Annual rainfall: 949.0 mm (37.36 in)
Localities around East Gresford
| Bingleburra | Allynbrook | Summer Hill |
| Summer Hill | East Gresford | Lewinsbrook |
| Summer Hill | Fishers Hill | Torryburn |

East Gresford is a village in the Hunter Region of New South Wales, Australia in Dungog Shire. The village is located 192 kilometres (119 mi) north of Sydney and the nearest major centres are Singleton some 42 kilometres (26 mi) southwest and Maitland to the south. In the 2006 census, it had a population of 289.

== History ==
The traditional owners of the area are the Gringai clan of the Wonnarua people, a group of Indigenous Australians.

The town is named after the Gresford village located in Wales, which is near Wrexham.

== Transport ==
Hunter Valley Buses operates one bus route through East Gresford:

- 185: Maitland to Gresford via Bolwarra, Paterson, Vacy and Torryburn

== Location ==
There are actually two small villages with the name 'Gresford'. There is Gresford (or West Gresford) on the Singleton side and East Gresford on the Maitland side. It appears that Gresford is the original township, as it is older and the location of the school and local Anglican church. But East Gresford is much larger and has the main shopping area. It is also home to the Gresford Scorpions Soccer Club.

The Gresford & District Community Group publishes the Gresford News, a monthly four-colour production which reports on activities in the district. It has a circulation of 800. The Community Group is also responsible for the creation of an arboretum featuring endangered and local native trees. Now in its third year of development there is increasing interest by groups to visit and learn about these important shrubs and trees.

East Gresford is close to the Barrington Tops National Park, which includes the highest peak in the Hunter Valley and is a World Heritage site. It also snows in the area each winter.

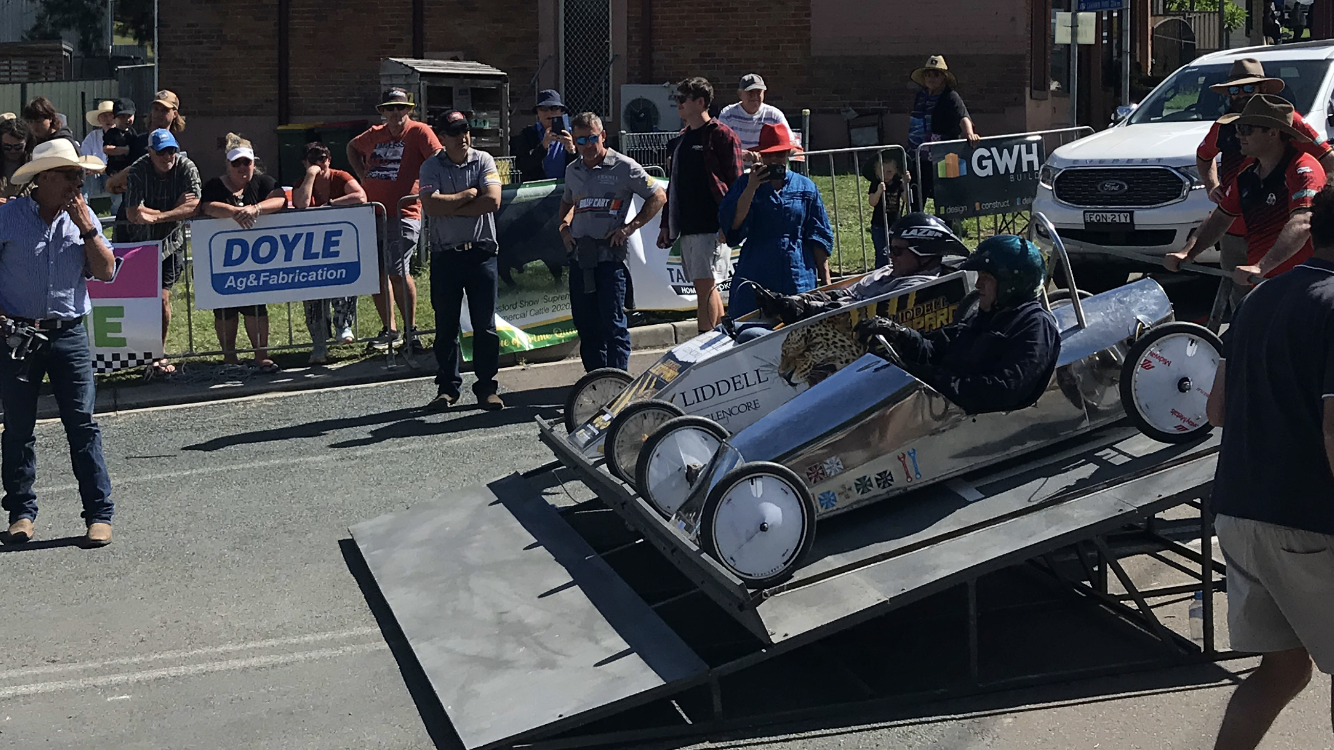
Gresford Billy Cart Derby

Park Street in East Gresford is the location for the popular Gresford Billy Cart Derby, the race is typically run annually on Easter Saturday, starting from a ramp beside The Beatty Hotel and finishing at the bottom of the hill beside the East Gresford Showground. The event was temporarily put on hiatus during the COVID-19 pandemic outbreak and has since returned.

In 2020 the annual Gresford Show was held in March. The showground is used as a camping site as it is located beside the Allyn River.

More information and updates on activities can also be obtained from the monthly publication of the Gresford News which is also available online.

== Climate ==
The areas surrounding East Gresford have a humid subtropical climate (Cfa) with hot summers and cool drier winters, similar to the Greater Western Sydney region.

Climate data for Lostock Dam
| Month | Jan | Feb | Mar | Apr | May | Jun | Jul | Aug | Sep | Oct | Nov | Dec | Year |
|---|---|---|---|---|---|---|---|---|---|---|---|---|---|
| Record high °C (°F) | 43.5 (110.3) | 45.6 (114.1) | 39.8 (103.6) | 36.7 (98.1) | 27.8 (82.0) | 25.0 (77.0) | 26.0 (78.8) | 28.3 (82.9) | 35.5 (95.9) | 38.5 (101.3) | 43.7 (110.7) | 42.0 (107.6) | 45.6 (114.1) |
| Mean daily maximum °C (°F) | 29.6 (85.3) | 28.6 (83.5) | 26.7 (80.1) | 23.6 (74.5) | 20.1 (68.2) | 17.0 (62.6) | 16.6 (61.9) | 18.5 (65.3) | 21.8 (71.2) | 24.7 (76.5) | 26.7 (80.1) | 28.9 (84.0) | 23.6 (74.5) |
| Mean daily minimum °C (°F) | 17.3 (63.1) | 17.2 (63.0) | 15.5 (59.9) | 12.6 (54.7) | 9.9 (49.8) | 7.7 (45.9) | 6.4 (43.5) | 6.8 (44.2) | 9.3 (48.7) | 11.8 (53.2) | 13.9 (57.0) | 16.1 (61.0) | 12.0 (53.6) |
| Record low °C (°F) | 9.2 (48.6) | 10.2 (50.4) | 5.6 (42.1) | 3.6 (38.5) | 0.7 (33.3) | 1.2 (34.2) | −1.7 (28.9) | −0.4 (31.3) | 1.0 (33.8) | 3.3 (37.9) | 6.0 (42.8) | 6.8 (44.2) | −1.7 (28.9) |
| Average precipitation mm (inches) | 124.2 (4.89) | 123.7 (4.87) | 124.4 (4.90) | 74.8 (2.94) | 70.1 (2.76) | 68.4 (2.69) | 38.3 (1.51) | 35.9 (1.41) | 48.1 (1.89) | 66.7 (2.63) | 90.3 (3.56) | 94.7 (3.73) | 973.7 (38.33) |
| Average precipitation days | 12.8 | 12.4 | 13.1 | 11.1 | 11.0 | 12.3 | 10.2 | 8.8 | 9.4 | 11.0 | 13.0 | 11.8 | 136.9 |
| Average relative humidity (%) | 53 | 59 | 61 | 55 | 56 | 61 | 54 | 46 | 43 | 50 | 50 | 45 | 53 |
