= Paterson River =

River in New South Wales, Australia

Paterson River Yimmang River, Cedar Arms River
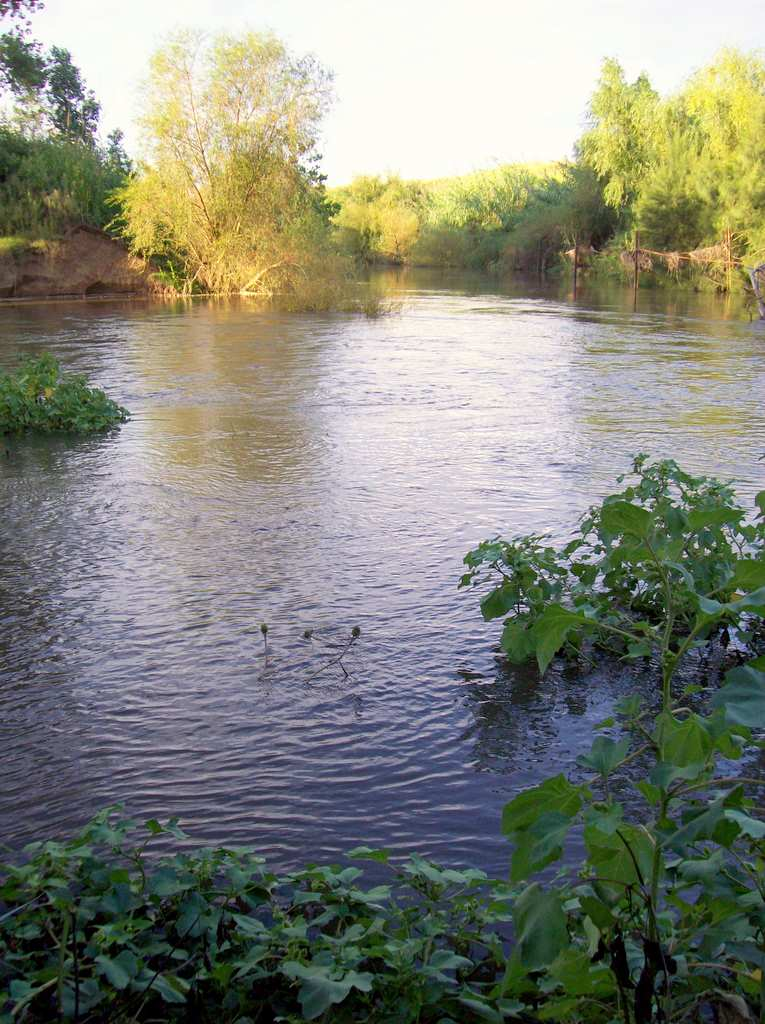
- Paterson River at Vacy, joined by the Allyn River (top right)
- Etymology: In honour of William Paterson

Location
- Country: Australia
- State: New South Wales
- Region: NSW North Coast (IBRA), Hunter, Mid North Coast
- Local government areas: Dungog; Maitland; Port Stephens
- Towns: Gresford, Vacy, Paterson, Woodville, Hinton

Physical characteristics
- Source: Barrington Tops
  - location: near Careys Peak
  - coordinates: 32°3′43.26″S 151°24′57″E
  - elevation: 256 m (840 ft)
- Mouth: Hunter River
  - location: Hinton
  - coordinates: 32°43′7.7″S 151°38′33.7″E
  - elevation: 3 m (9.8 ft)
- Length: 159 km (99 mi)

Basin features
- River system: Hunter River catchment
- Tributaries
  - left: Sheepstation Creek, Allyn River, Dunns Creek (New South Wales)
  - right: Boonabilla Creek, Horse Creek (New South Wales), Fenwicks Creek
- National park: Barrington Tops National Park

Paterson River, a perennial river that is part of the Hunter River catchment, is located in the Hunter and Mid North Coast regions of New South Wales, Australia.

== Course and features ==
Paterson River rises in the Barrington Tops National Park, west by north of Careys Peak, and flows generally south and southeast, joined by six minor tributaries including the Allyn River at Vacy, before reaching its confluence with the Hunter River between Hinton and Morpeth. Between Hinton and Duns Creek, the Paterson River forms the border between the Port Stephens and Maitland local government areas. The river system courses through fertile the farming land of the Paterson and Allyn River Valleys and the historic Patersons Plains, descending 933 metres (3,061 ft) over its 151 kilometres (94 mi) course.

The river is impounded by Lostock Dam, located 48 kilometres (30 mi) downstream from the source in the Barringtons. The embankment dam was constructed by the New South Wales Department of Water Resources to supply water for irrigation and was completed in 1971. The river is tidal to above the village of Paterson and below Vacy.

Riverside towns within the Paterson's catchment include Gresford, Vacy, Paterson, Woodville and Hinton.

Colonel William Paterson surveyed the area along the river in 1801. Later Governor King named it in his honour.
