= Gresford, New South Wales =

Gresford is a locality in the Dungog Shire, New South Wales, Australia.

== Transport ==
Hunter Valley Buses operates one bus route through Gresford:

- 185: Gresford to Maitland via Torryburn, Vacy, Paterson and Bolwarra

== Events ==
- Australia Day Luncheon, 26 January
- Gresford Agricultural Show, Second Friday and Saturday in March
- Gresford Billy Cart Derby, Easter Sunday
- Gresford Rodeo and Campdraft, on the last weekend in August
- Landcare Annual Field day and Dinner, held in October
- GAPS carols, held in December
