= Kanuka =

Kanuka or Kānuka may refer to:

- Kanuka or Kānuka (Kunzea ericoides), a shrub or tree endemic to New Zealand
- Kānuka Hills, a range of hills in New Zealand
- Kanooka (Tristaniopsis laurina), or water gum, an Australian rainforest tree
- Hill kanooka (Tristaniopsis collina), or hill water gum, an Australian rainforest tree
- Kanuka Clancy, a fictional character from Patlabor, an anime and manga franchise
