= Mount Royal (New South Wales) =

Mountain in Australia

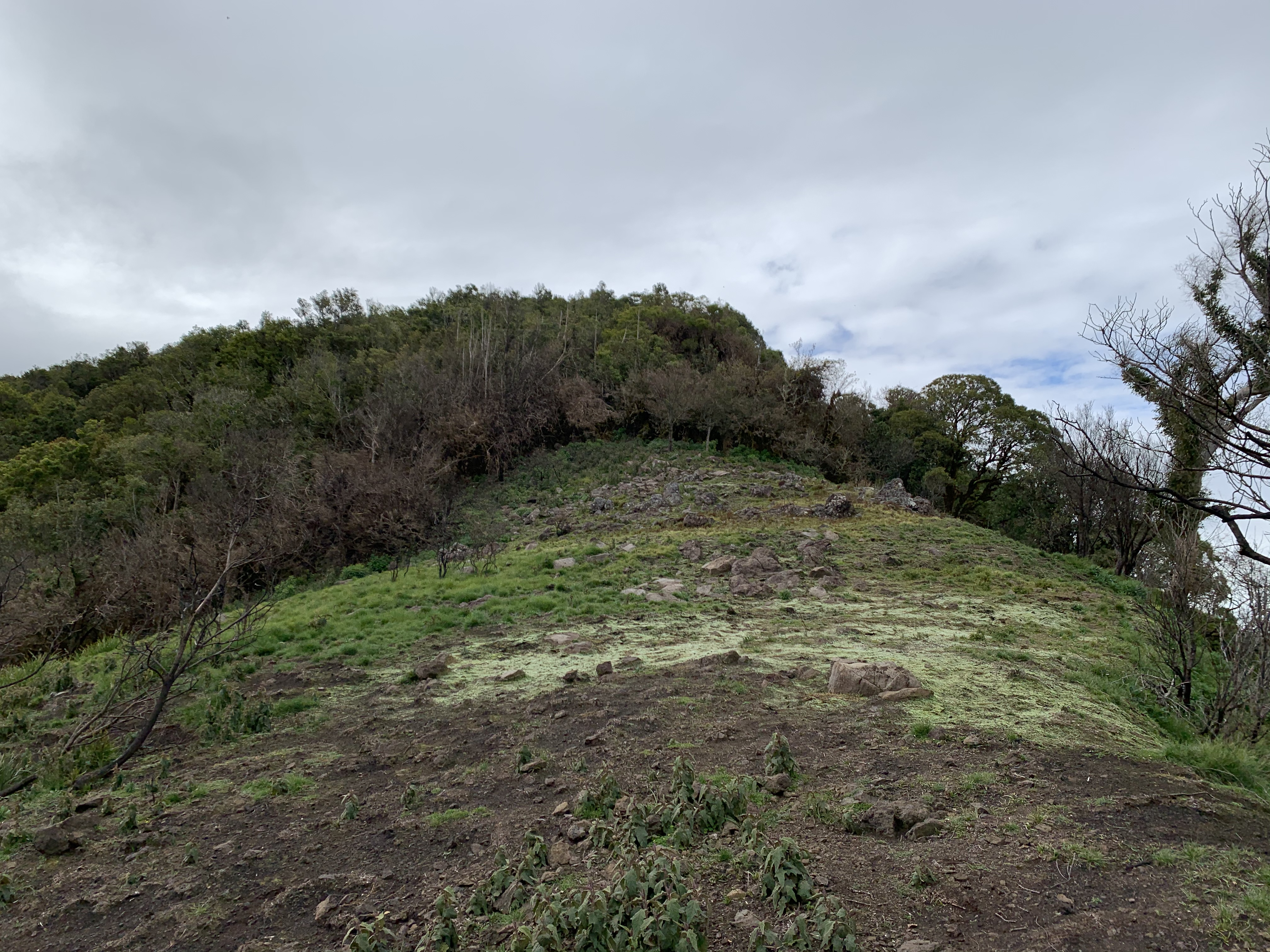
- rainforest covered summit of Mount Royal.

Highest point
- Elevation: 1,185 m (3,888 ft)
- Coordinates: 32°10.454′S 151°19.571′E

Geography
- Location: Hunter Region, Australia
- Country: Australia
- Parent range: Mount Royal Range

Geology
- Rock age: Late Paleocene
- Mountain type: basalt cap

Mount Royal is situated at the southern end of the Mount Royal Range in the Barrington Tops region of eastern Australia. It is part of the World Heritage Gondwana Rainforests of Australia.

The lower sections of the mountain are made up of sedimentary rocks such as mudstones. A residual basalt cap appears at 1,100 metres (3,600 ft) above sea level. It originated from the flow of the nearby Barrington Volcano. The mountain is partially in Mount Royal National Park and Barrington Tops National Park.

== History ==
The first European settler to discover and summit Mount Royal was Ludwig Leichhardt in 1843.

== Flora ==
The high elevation rainforest growing on the red/brown soils lacks the Antarctic beech despite apparently ideal conditions. Their place the upper canopy is taken by the golden sassafras. The elevated narrow rainforest features hanging moss, often covered in mist.

The mountain's summit is covered in a low rainforest thicket, composed mostly of the hill water gum. Other noteworthy plants on the mountain include New England blackbutt, chainfruit, prickly ash, grass tree and the mountain walnut. Another interesting feature of Mount Royal is the grassy balds, surrounded by temperate rainforest. Fire caused by lightning is one speculative theory of their origin.

The lower south east slopes of Mount Royal support a well developed sub-tropical rainforest. Significant species include the Australian red cedar, citronella, rosewood and the giant stinging tree.

== Fauna ==
A considerable variety of birds and animals are found in the area. Wedge-tailed eagles, eastern grey kangaroos and tiger snakes are common. Some of the more rare inhabitants include: the rufous scrub-bird, paradise riflebird, wompoo fruit dove, Parma wallaby, rough-scaled snake, stuttering frog, Booroolong frog and the Davies' tree frog. The Hastings River mouse was rediscovered here in the 1980s.

== Gallery ==
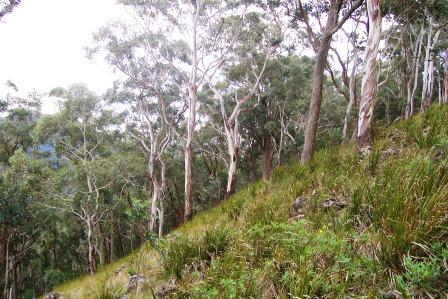
Mount Royal - eucalyptus forest

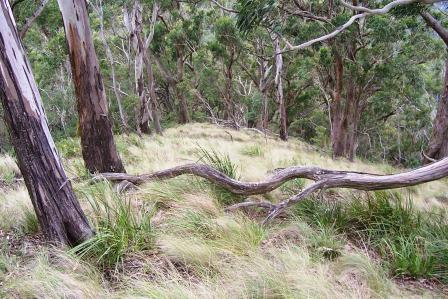
Mount Royal - eucalyptus forest

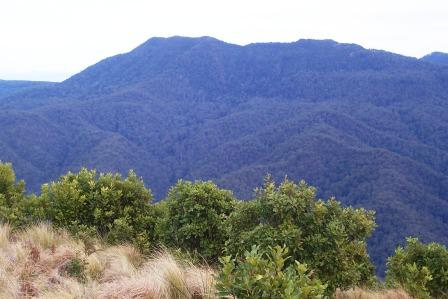
Mount Royal, photographed from Mount Cabrebald

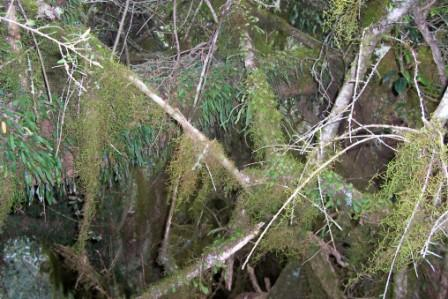
Cloud forest, moss and ferns

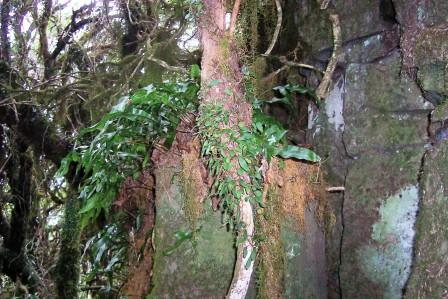
Cloud forest, basalt and ferns

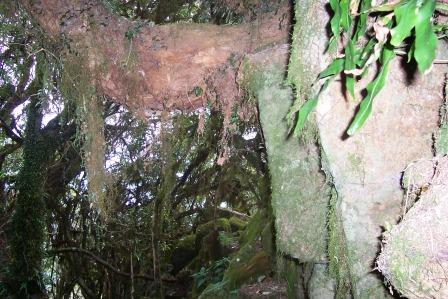
Cloud forest, basalt, ferns and moss

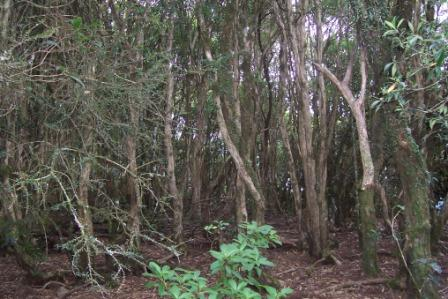
Cloud forest, Hill water gum rainforest at summit

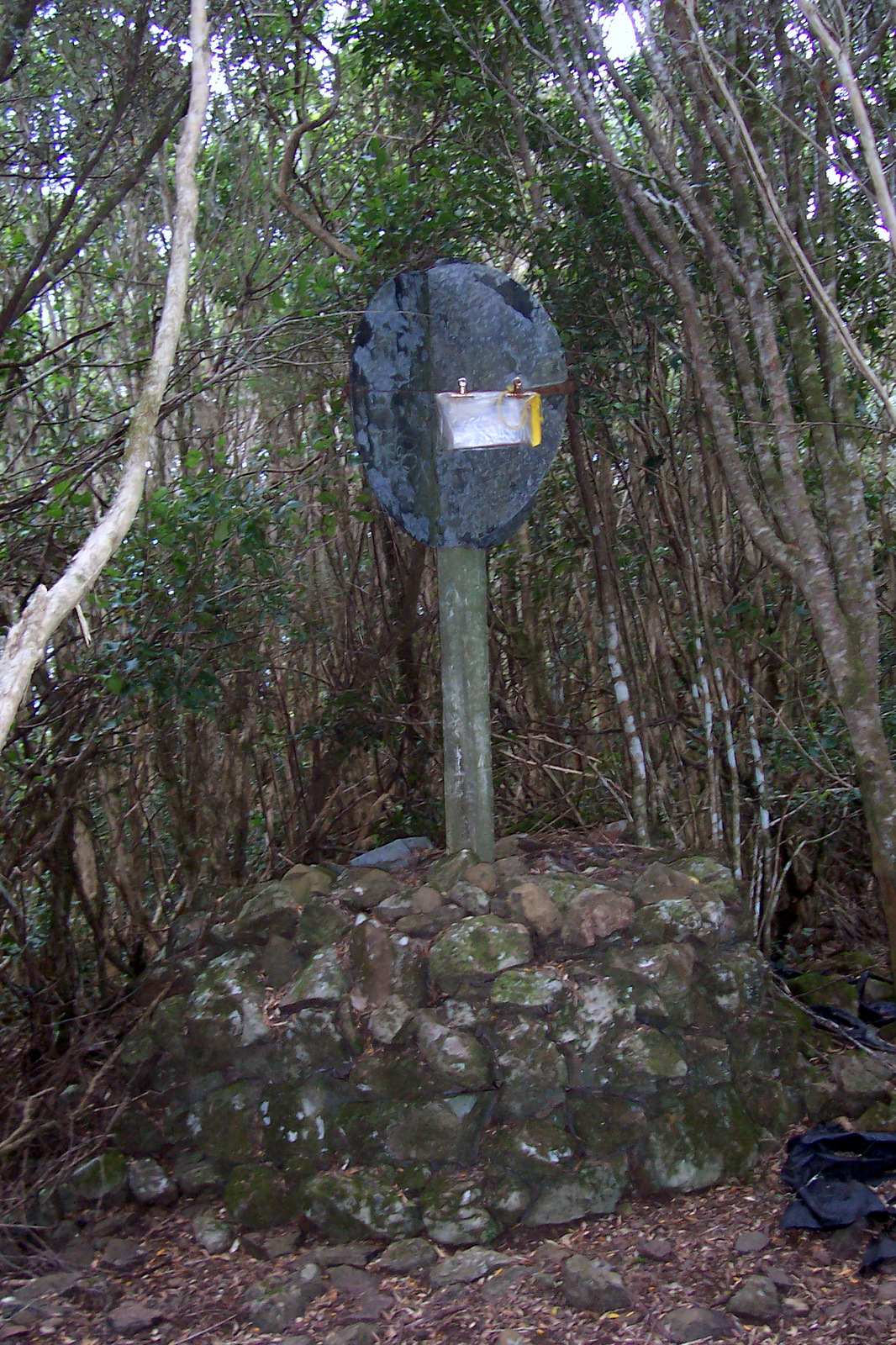
Summit

== See also ==
- List of mountains in Australia § New South Wales
