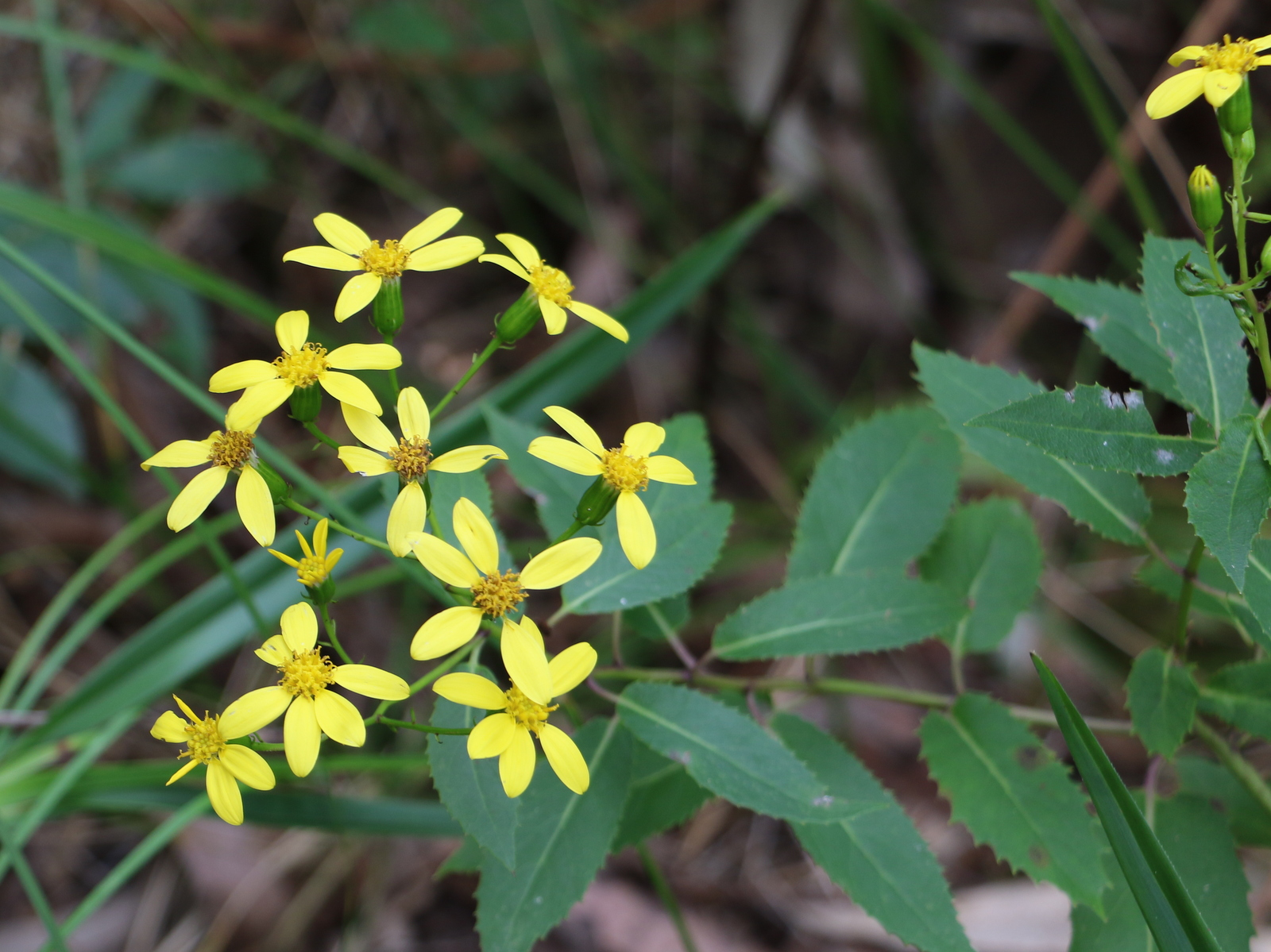
- Mount Cabrebald, Australia

Scientific classification
- Kingdom: Plantae
- Clade: Tracheophytes
- Clade: Angiosperms
- Clade: Eudicots
- Clade: Asterids
- Order: Asterales
- Family: Asteraceae
- Genus: Lordhowea
- Species: L. amygdalifolia

Binomial name
- Lordhowea amygdalifolia (F.Muell.) Schmidt-Leb.

Synonyms
- Senecio amygdalifolius F.Muell.

= Lordhowea amygdalifolia =

Species of flowering plant

Lordhowea amygdalifolia, synonym Senecio amygdalifolius, is a species of flowering plant in the daisy family (Asteraceae). It occurs in the Australian states of New South Wales and Queensland, in wet eucalyptus forest or around the margins of rainforest. Ferdinand von Mueller first described it in 1859, as Senecio amygdalifolius, from a collection made by Dr. Hermann Beckler, near the Hastings River.
