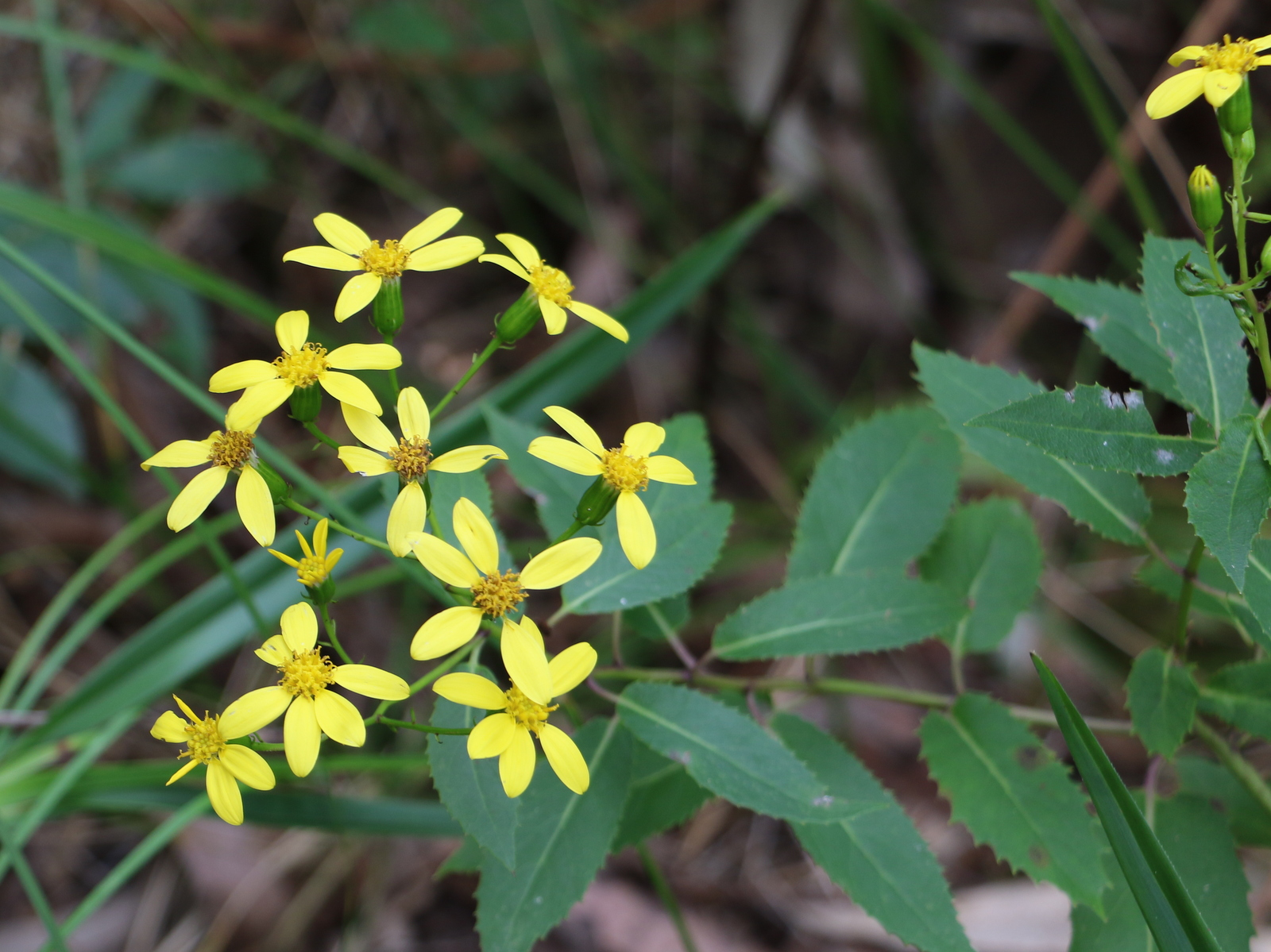
- Lordhowea amygdalifolia on Mount Cabrebald, Australia

Scientific classification
- Kingdom: Plantae
- Clade: Tracheophytes
- Clade: Angiosperms
- Clade: Eudicots
- Clade: Asterids
- Order: Asterales
- Family: Asteraceae
- Subfamily: Asteroideae
- Tribe: Senecioneae
- Genus: Lordhowea; B.Nord.

Species
- See text.

= Lordhowea (plant) =

Genus of plants

Lordhowea is a genus of flowering plant in the family Asteraceae, native to eastern and south-eastern Australia and Lord Howe Island. The genus was established by Bertil Nordenstam in 1978.

== Description ==
As circumscribed in a 2020 study, species of the genus Lordhowea are somewhat tall and open herbaceous to shrubby plants with wide and undivided leaves. Lordhowea insularis is particularly shrubby. The flower heads are arranged in a cymose panicle. All except L. insularis have long ray florets. The three species whose chromosome number is known have the unusual value of n = 19.

== Taxonomy ==
The genus Lordhowea was established by Bertil Nordenstam 1978 with the sole species Lordhowea insularis, endemic to Lord Howe Island, which Nordenstam transferred from Senecio. The genus remained monotypic until 2020, when a molecular phylogenetic study of Australian species placed in the tribe Senecioneae found that L. insularis formed a clade with three species then placed in Senecio. This clade was clearly distinct from other Senecio species, both genetically and morphologically. Accordingly, the authors of the 2020 study expanded Lordhowea to include these three mainland Australian species.

=== Species ===
As of January 2023, Plants of the World Online accepted four species:

- Lordhowea amygdalifolia (F.Muell.) Schmidt-Leb.
- Lordhowea insularis (Benth.) B.Nord.
- Lordhowea pilosicrista (I.Thomps.) Schmidt-Leb.
- Lordhowea velleioides (A.Cunn. ex DC.) Schmidt-Leb.
