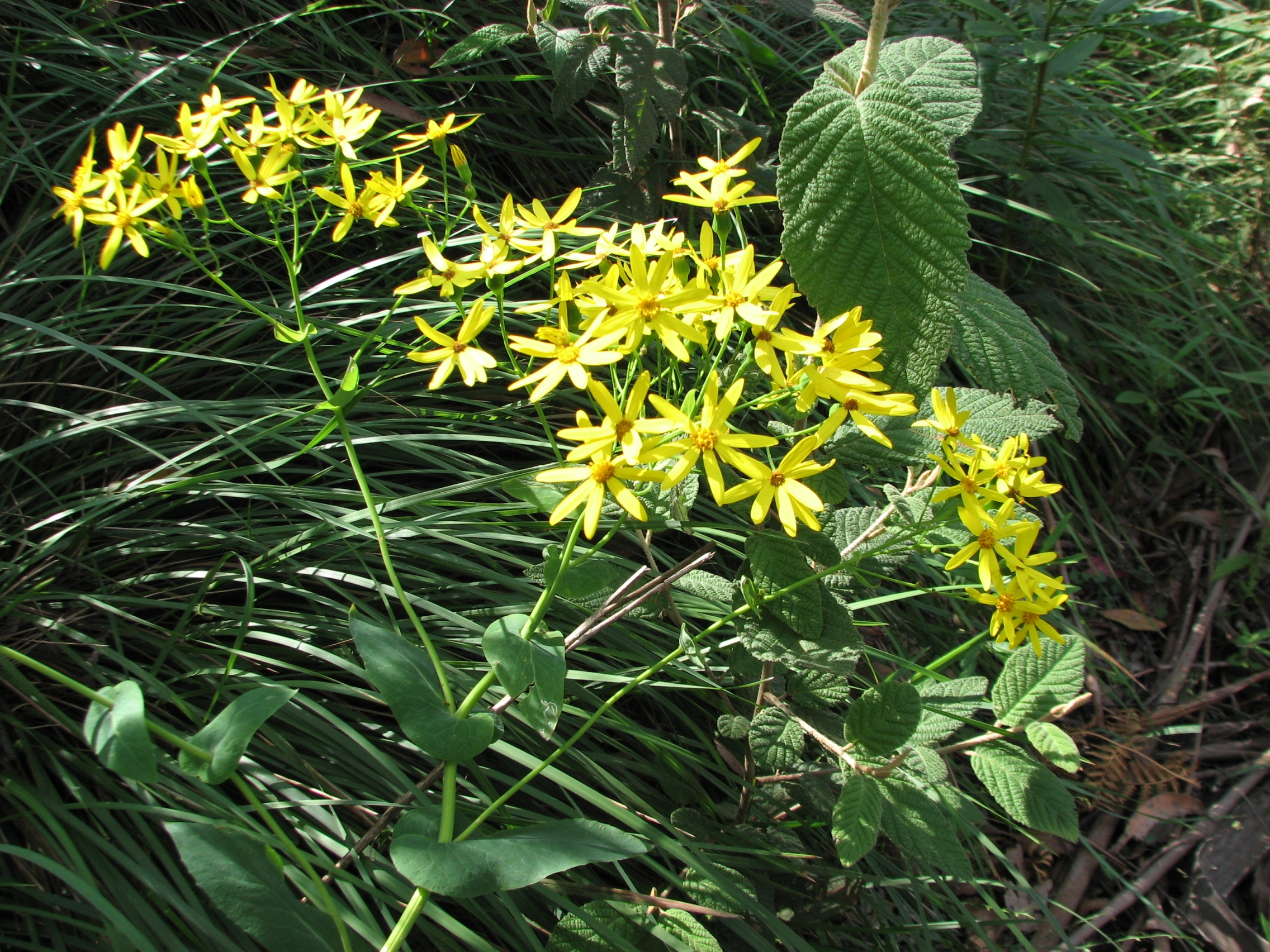

Scientific classification
- Kingdom: Plantae
- Clade: Tracheophytes
- Clade: Angiosperms
- Clade: Eudicots
- Clade: Asterids
- Order: Asterales
- Family: Asteraceae
- Genus: Lordhowea
- Species: L. velleioides

Binomial name
- Lordhowea velleioides (A.Cunn. ex DC.) Schmidt-Leb.

Synonyms
- Senecio velleioides A.Cunn. ex DC.

= Lordhowea velleioides =

Species of flowering plant

Lordhowea velleioides, synonym Senecio velleioides, is a species of flowering plant in the family Asteraceae. It is commonly known as forest groundsel.

The species occurs in the Australian states of New South Wales, Victoria and Tasmania.

== Taxonomy ==
A description of the species was first published in 1838 by Augustin Pyramus de Candolle using the name Senecio velleioides, which de Candolle attributed to Allan Cunningham. A 2020 molecular phylogenetic study of Australian species placed in the tribe Senecioneae found that Senecio velleioides was part of a clade containing Lordhowea insularis that was clearly distinct from other Senecio species, both genetically and morphologically. Accordingly, the authors of the 2020 study expanded Lordhowea to include S. velleioides.
