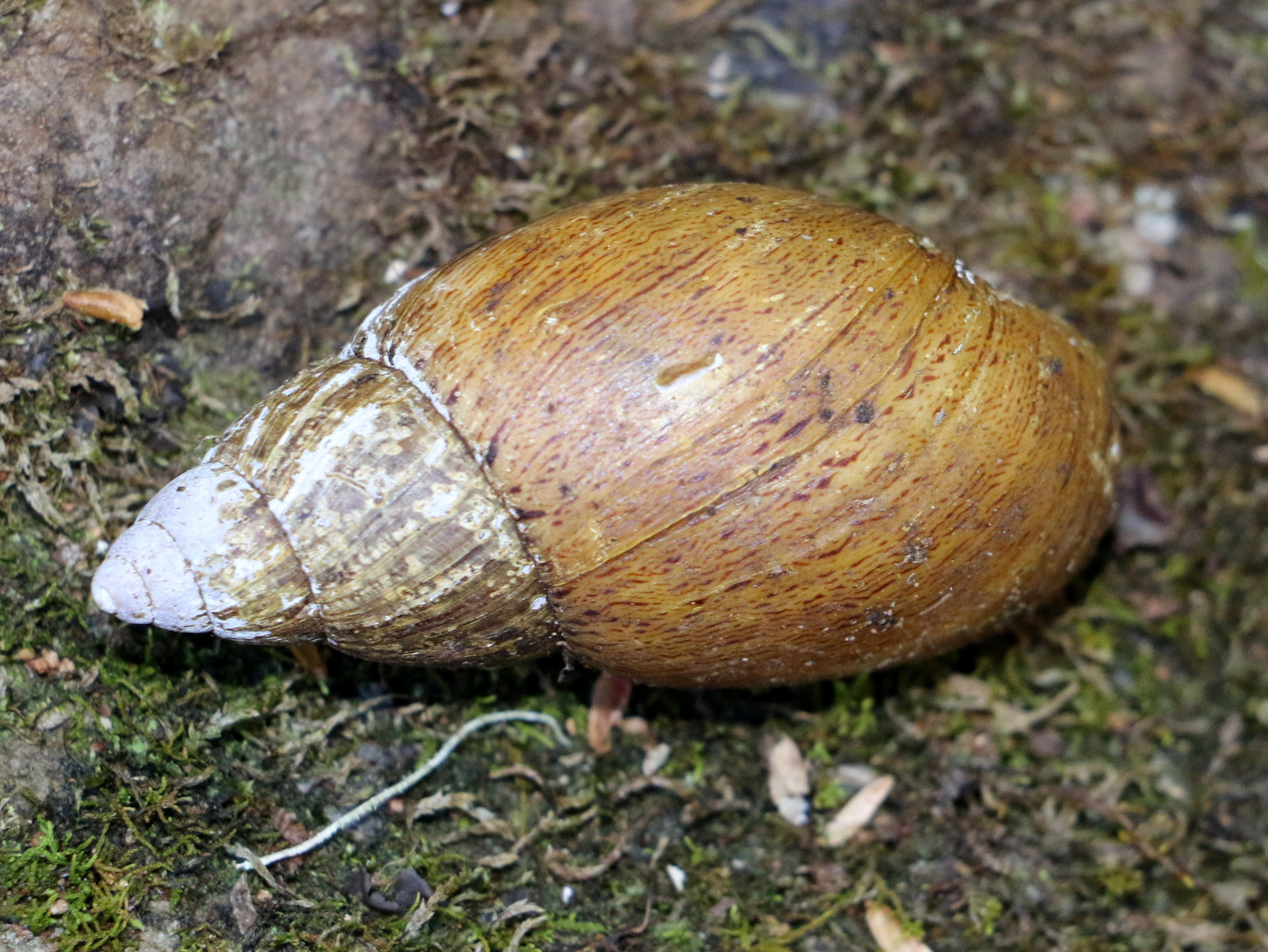
- Empty shell in rainforest at Mount Royal, Australia

Scientific classification
- Kingdom: Animalia
- Phylum: Mollusca
- Class: Gastropoda
- Order: Stylommatophora
- Informal group: Sigmurethra
- Family: Caryodidae
- Genus: Pygmipanda
- Species: P. atomata

Binomial name
- Pygmipanda atomata Gray, 1834

Synonyms
- Bulimus atomatus Gray, 1834; Panda atomata azonata Hedley, 1892; Panda atomata elongata Hedley, 1892

= Pygmipanda atomata =

Species of gastropod

Pygmipanda atomata, the dwarf panda snail, is a species of air-breathing land snail, a terrestrial pulmonate gastropod mollusc in the family Caryodidae.
