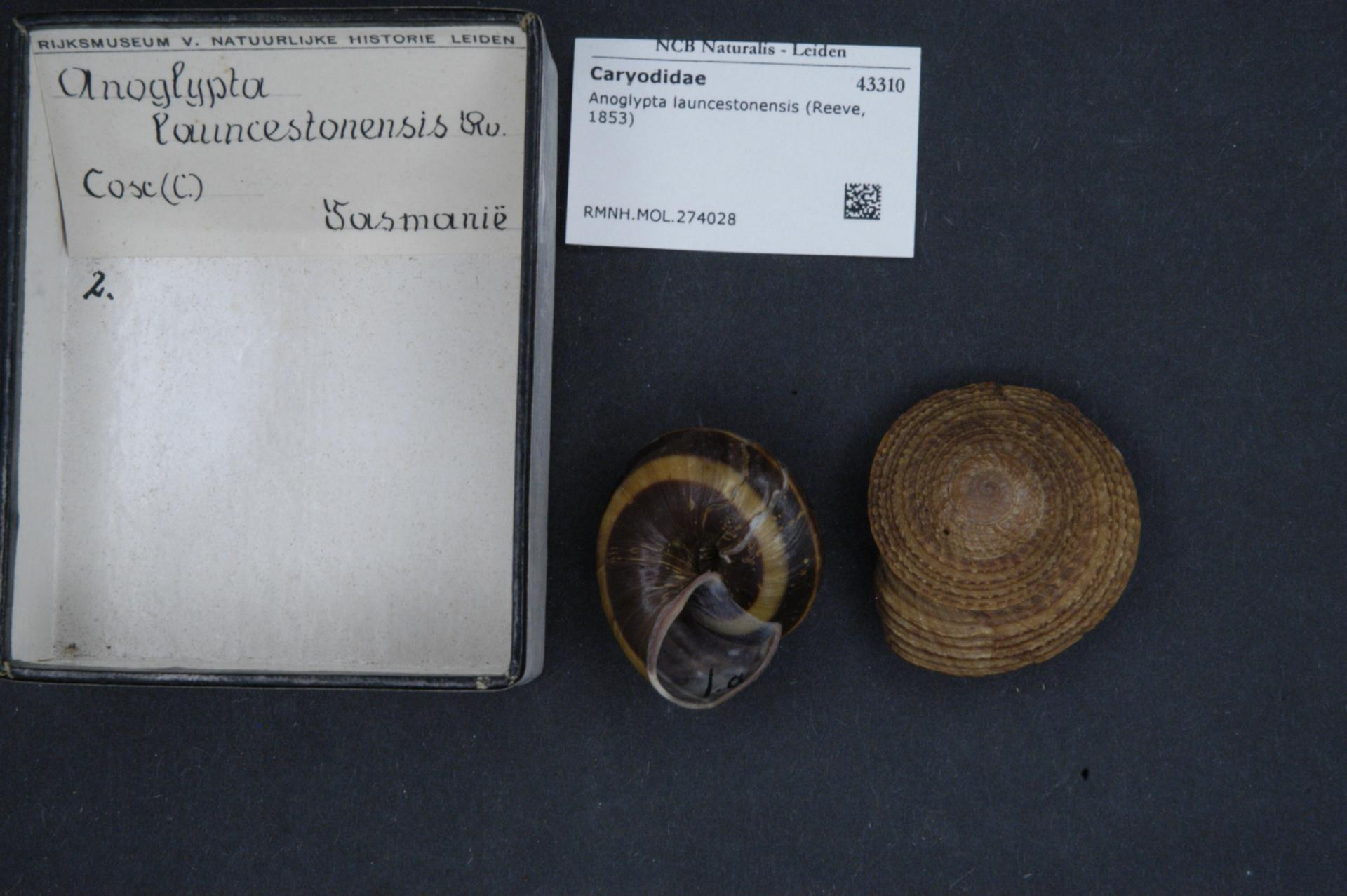

Conservation status
- Near Threatened (IUCN 3.1)

Scientific classification
- Kingdom: Animalia
- Phylum: Mollusca
- Class: Gastropoda
- Order: Stylommatophora
- Family: Caryodidae
- Genus: Anoglypta
- Species: A. launcestonensis

Binomial name
- Anoglypta launcestonensis (Reeve, 1853)

Synonyms
- Helix launcestonensis Reeve, 1853

= Granulated Tasmanian snail =

Species of gastropod

The granulated Tasmanian snail (Anoglypta launcestonensis) is a species of air-breathing land snail, a terrestrial pulmonate gastropod mollusk in the family Caryodidae. The specific epithet launcestonensis references Launceston, Tasmania.

== Distribution ==
This species is endemic to Australia.
