= Pieres Peak =

Mountain in New South Wales, Australia

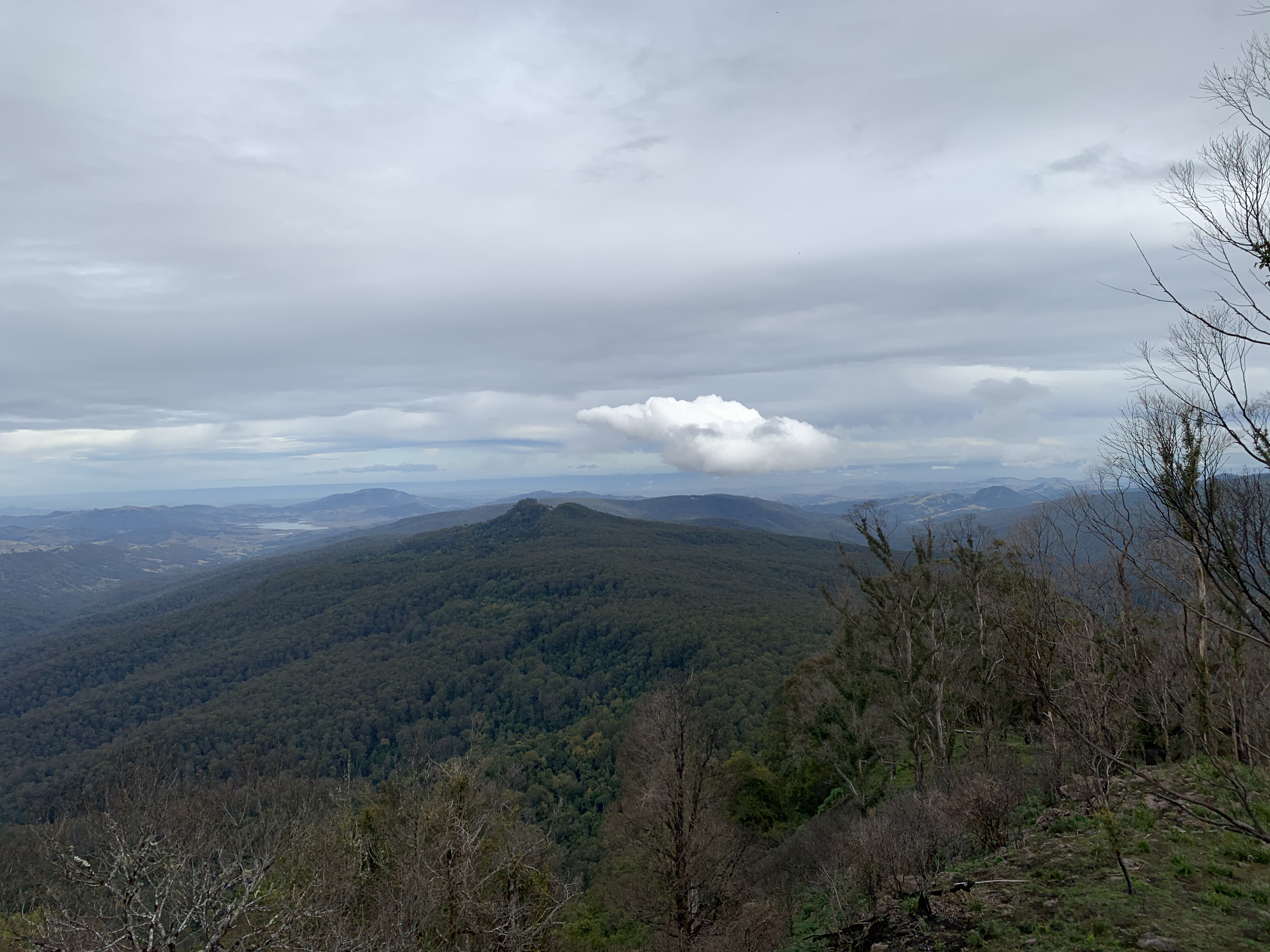
- Pieres Peak viewed from Mount Royal.

Highest point
- Elevation: 985 m (3,232 ft)
- Coordinates: 32.2097°S 151.3043°E

Geography
- Location: Hunter Region, Australia
- Country: Australia
- State(s): New South Wales, Australia
- Parent range: Mount Royal Range

Geology
- Rock age: Late Paleocene

Climbing
- Easiest route: Pieres Peak Trail

Pieres Peak is a mountain in the Mount Royal Range in Northern New South Wales.

It is located entirely within the Mount Royal National Park.

A 3.7 km (2.3 mi) long out and back walking trail has been established from the Youngville camping area to the summit of the peak.
