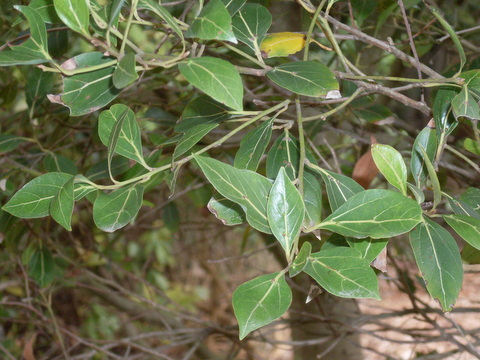
- Leaves from Mount Royal

Conservation status
- Least Concern (IUCN 3.1)

Scientific classification
- Kingdom: Plantae
- Clade: Tracheophytes
- Clade: Angiosperms
- Clade: Magnoliids
- Order: Laurales
- Family: Lauraceae
- Genus: Cryptocarya
- Species: C. foveolata

Binomial name
- Cryptocarya foveolata C.T.White & W.D.Francis

Synonyms
- Cryptocarya cinnamomifolia var. parvifolia F.M.Bailey; Cryptocarya microphylla Kosterm.; Cryptocarya parvifolia (F.M.Bailey) Domin

= Cryptocarya foveolata =

Species of tree

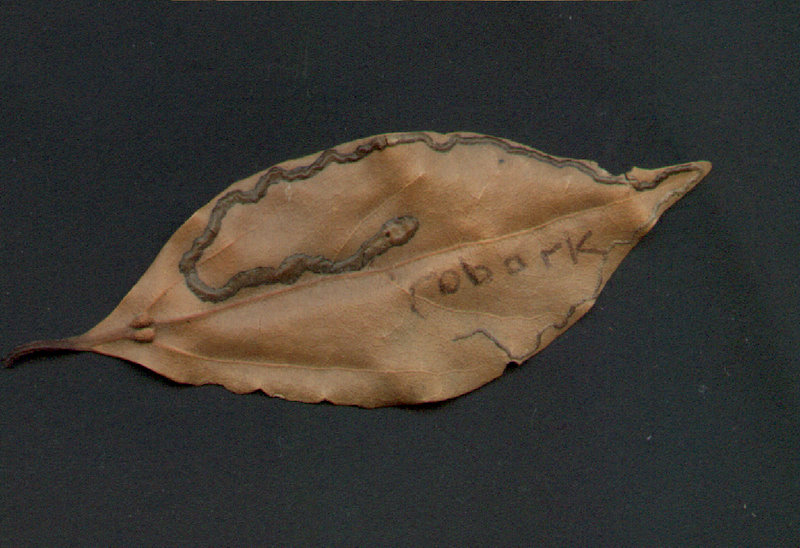
Leaf miner trail on a fallen mountain walnut leaf from Cobark Park, Barrington Tops. Note the prominent two glands (fovelae) at the base of the leaf

Cryptocarya foveolata, commonly known as small-leaved laurel, small-leaved cryptocarya or mountain walnut, is a species of flowering plant in the family Lauraceae and is endemic to eastern Australia. It is a medium-sized to large tree with elliptic to egg-shaped leaves, cream coloured, perfumed, tube-shaped flowers, and spherical black drupes.

== Description ==
Cryptocarya foveolata is a medium-sized to large tree, typically growing to 40 m (130 ft) high with a trunk dbh of 120 cm (47 in), the stem sometimes butressed. The bark is brown, mostly smooth with lines of vertical bumps running up the trunk. The leaves are arranged alternately, elliptic to egg-shaped, 35–70 mm (1.4–2.8 in) long and 20–36 mm (0.79–1.42 in) long on a petiole 4–7 mm (0.16–0.28 in) long. The leaves usually have 3 distinct veins and are green on the upper surface, more or less glaucous on the lower surface and have many small pits on the surfaces. One or two pairs of hollow glands (domatia) are present at the base of the leaf.

The flowers are cream-coloured, perfumed, and arranged in panicles or racemes in leaf axils and are shorter than the leaves. The perianth tube is 1.5–1.6 mm (0.059–0.063 in) long and 1.6–1.8 mm (0.063–0.071 in) wide and covered with soft hairs. The tepals are 1.9–2.5 mm (0.075–0.098 in) long and 1.0–1.5 mm (0.039–0.059 in) wide, the outer anthers 0.9–1.1 mm (0.035–0.043 in) long and 0.6–0.8 mm (0.024–0.031 in) wide, the inner anthers about 1 mm (0.039 in) long and 0.6–0.7 mm (0.024–0.028 in) wide. The ovary is 1.0–1.1 mm (0.039–0.043 in) long and 0.6 mm (0.024 in) wide and the style is glabrous. Flowering mainly occurs in November and December, and the fruit is a spherical black drupe, 13–14 mm (0.51–0.55 in) long and 15–16 mm (0.59–0.63 in) wide.

== Taxonomy ==
Cryptocarya foveolata was first formally described in 1924 by Cyril Tenison White and William Douglas Francis in Proceedings of the Royal Society of Queensland. The specific epithet (foveolata) means 'minutely pitted'.

== Distribution and habitat ==
Cryptocarya foveolata grows in rainforests on fertile soils, mostly 600 m (2,000 ft) or higher above sea level, and is often seen in association with the Antarctic beech. The natural range of distribution is from Mount Royal in the Barrington Tops to the McPherson Range on the border of Queensland and New South Wales.
