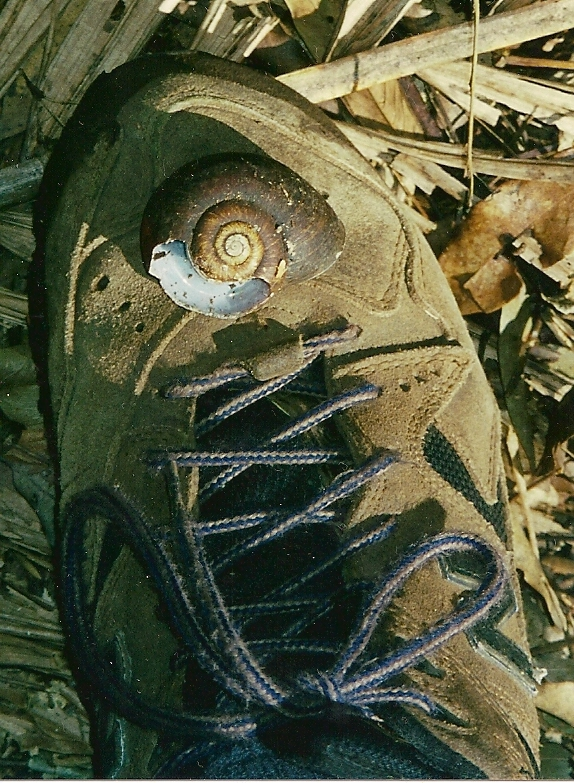
- A broken shell of Pedinogyra rotabilis at Border Ranges National Park, Australia

Scientific classification
- Kingdom: Animalia
- Phylum: Mollusca
- Class: Gastropoda
- Order: Stylommatophora
- Family: Caryodidae
- Genus: Pedinogyra
- Species: P. rotabilis

Binomial name
- Pedinogyra rotabilis (Reeve, 1852)
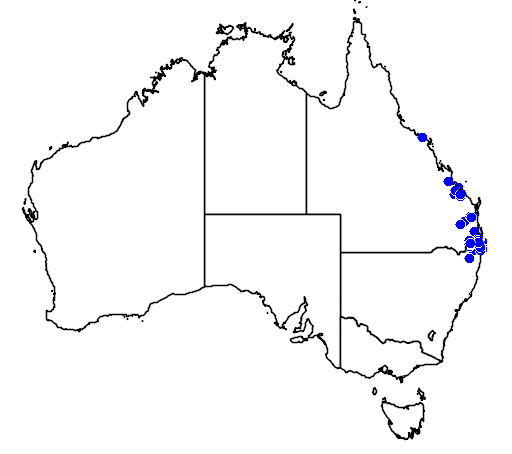
- Distribution map of Pedinogyra rotabilis

Synonyms
- Helix rotabilis Reeve, 1852

= Pedinogyra rotabilis =

Species of gastropod

Pedinogyra rotabilis is a species of air-breathing land snail, a terrestrial pulmonate gastropod mollusc in the family Caryodidae.

== Distribution ==
This species is endemic to Australia.
