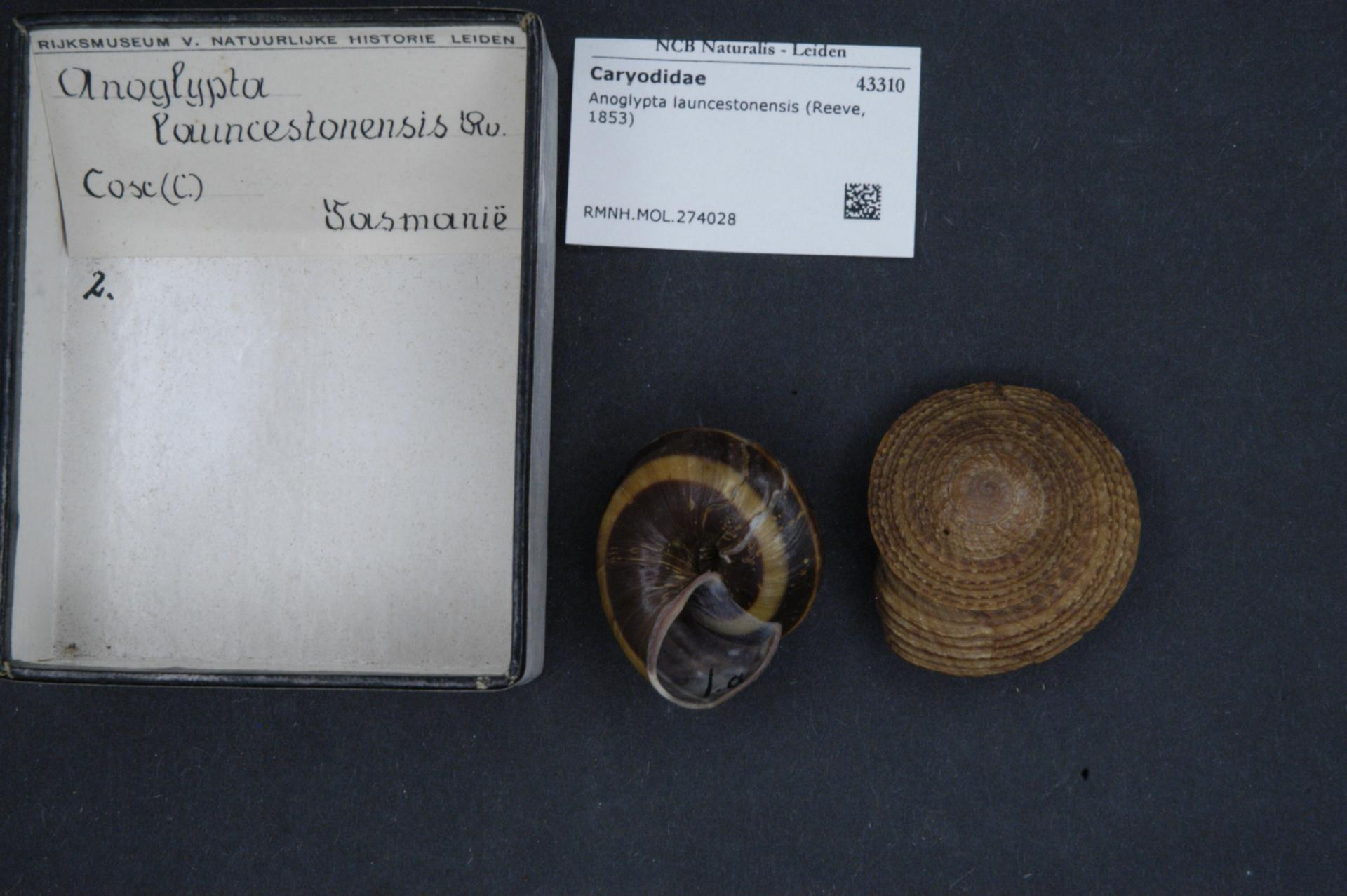

Scientific classification
- Kingdom: Animalia
- Phylum: Mollusca
- Class: Gastropoda
- Order: Stylommatophora
- Family: Caryodidae
- Genus: Anoglypta; Martens, 1860

= Anoglypta =

Genus of gastropods

Anoglypta is a genus of air-breathing land snail, a terrestrial pulmonate gastropod mollusk in the family Caryodidae.

== Species ==
This genus contains the following species:

- Anoglypta launcestonensis Reeve, 1853 - Granulated Tasmanian snail
