= Mount Royal National Park =

National park in Australia

- IUCN category II (national park)
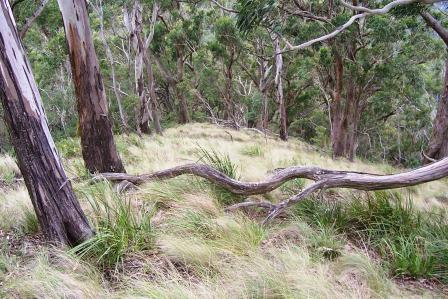
- Eucalyptus on a steep ridge near Mount Royal

- Location within New South Wales
- Location: New South Wales
- Coordinates: 32°12′1″S 151°19′25″E
- Area: 69 km^{2} (27 sq mi)
- Established: 1 January 1997
- Governing body: NSW National Parks & Wildlife Service
- Website: Official website

The Mount Royal National Park is a protected national park located in the Hunter region of New South Wales, Australia. Gazetted in 1997, the 6,920-hectare (17,100-acre) park is situated approximately 187 kilometres (116 mi) north of Sydney. Sections of the park had been subject to logging, which was disrupted by a blockade in 1989.

The park is part of the Barrington Tops group World Heritage Site Gondwana Rainforests of Australia inscribed in 1986 and added to the Australian National Heritage List in 2007.

During the 2019 Australian Bushfire Season, the park was damaged by the 'Mount Royal 1' fire.

== Major Peaks ==
Mount Royal is the highest peak at 1,186m.

Pieres Peak is a major peak south of Mount Royal at 986m.

== Fauna ==
The park is home to endangered animal species such as parma wallaby, rufous scrub bird, paradise riflebird, hastings river mouse and the glossy black-cockatoo.

The animals that live here do not seem to have evolved, today they look like their fossil remains.

== See also ==
- Protected areas of New South Wales
- Mount Royal
- Mount Royal Range
