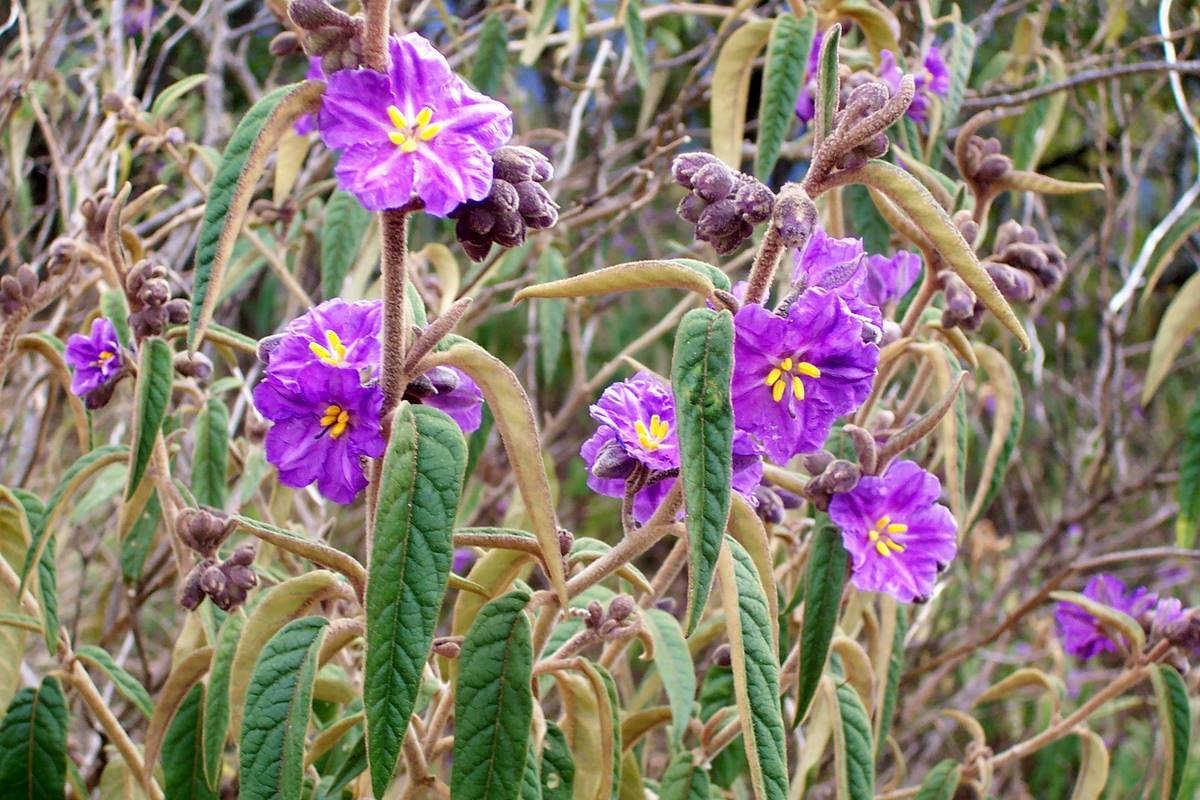
- Mount Cabrebald, Australia

Scientific classification
- Kingdom: Plantae
- Clade: Tracheophytes
- Clade: Angiosperms
- Clade: Eudicots
- Clade: Asterids
- Order: Solanales
- Family: Solanaceae
- Genus: Solanum
- Species: S. curvicuspe

Binomial name
- Solanum curvicuspe Domin

= Solanum curvicuspe =

Species of shrub

Solanum curvicuspe is a shrub found in the mountain ranges of the north east of New South Wales, Australia. Purple flowers form from August to October.
