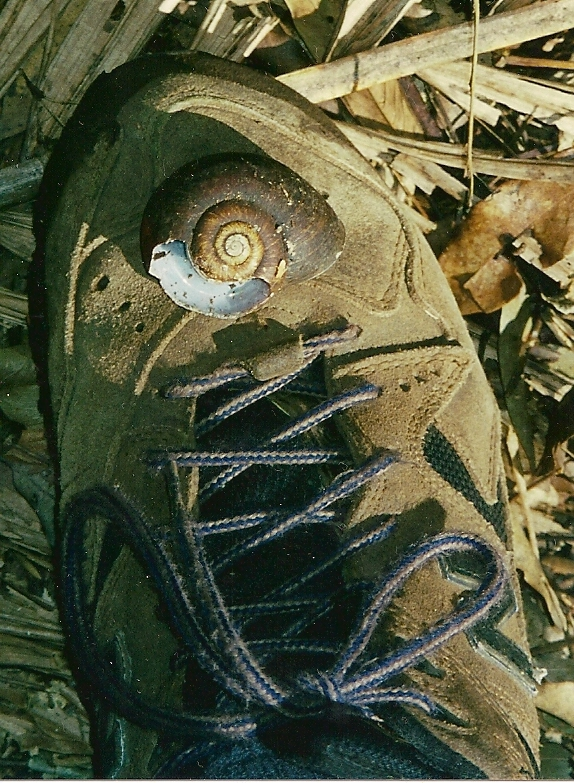
- A broken shell of Pedinogyra rotabilis at Border Ranges National Park, Australia

Scientific classification
- Kingdom: Animalia
- Phylum: Mollusca
- Class: Gastropoda
- Order: Stylommatophora
- Superfamily: Rhytidoidea
- Family: Caryodidae; Connolly, 1915

Genera
- See text

Synonyms
- Anoglyptidae Iredale, 1937; Hedleyellidae Iredale, 1937; Pedinogyridae Iredale, 1937

= Caryodidae =

Family of gastropods

Caryodidae is a taxonomic family of air-breathing land snails, terrestrial pulmonate gastropod mollusks in the superfamily Acavoidea (according to the taxonomy of the Gastropoda by Bouchet & Rocroi, 2005).

This family is endemic to eastern Australia.

This family has no subfamilies (according to the taxonomy of the Gastropoda by Bouchet & Rocroi, 2005).

This family was previously treated as a subfamily of the family Acavidae.

== Genera ==
The family Caryodidae has no subfamilies.

Genera and species within this family include:

- Anoglypta Martens, 1860
- Brazieresta Iredale, 1933
- Caryodes Albers, 1850 - type genus
- Hedleyella Iredale, 1914
- Pandofella Iredale, 1933
- Pedinogyra Albers, 1860
  - Pedinogyra allani Iredale, 1937
  - Pedinogyra effossa Iredale, 1937
  - Pedinogyra hayii (Griffith & Pidgeon, 1833)
  - Pedinogyra minor (Mousson, 1869)
  - Pedinogyra hayii (Reeve, 1852)
  - Pedinogyra rotabilis (Reeve, 1852)
- Pygmipanda Iredale, 1933 includes Pygmipanda atomata
