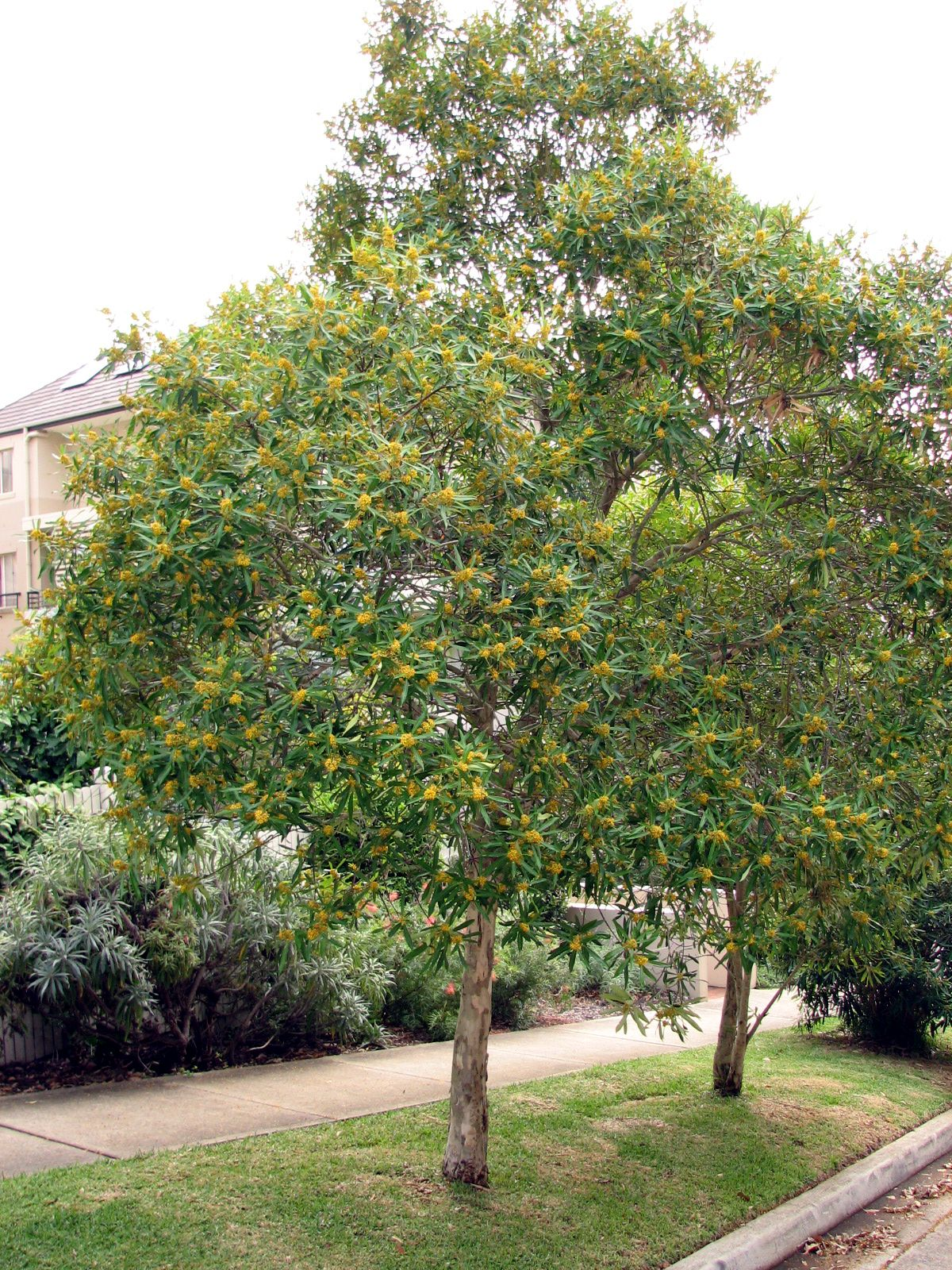

Scientific classification
- Kingdom: Plantae
- Clade: Tracheophytes
- Clade: Angiosperms
- Clade: Eudicots
- Clade: Rosids
- Order: Myrtales
- Family: Myrtaceae
- Genus: Tristaniopsis
- Species: T. laurina

Binomial name
- Tristaniopsis laurina (Sm.) Peter G.Wilson & J.T.Waterh.

Synonyms
- Tristiana laurina

= Tristaniopsis laurina =

Species of tree

Tristaniopsis laurina, the water gum or kanooka, is a tree species native to Australia. It usually grows near the eastern coastline and along the banks of streams, where the trunks and branches tend to be shaped in the direction of the current and give an indication of the flood height.

== Description ==
Tristaniopsis laurina has a slow rate of growth, and usually reaches 15–30 feet (4.6–9.1 m) tall. The tree is multi-branched, and may be pruned to maintain a compact shape. It can grow to be 128 feet (39 m) tall in native habitats.

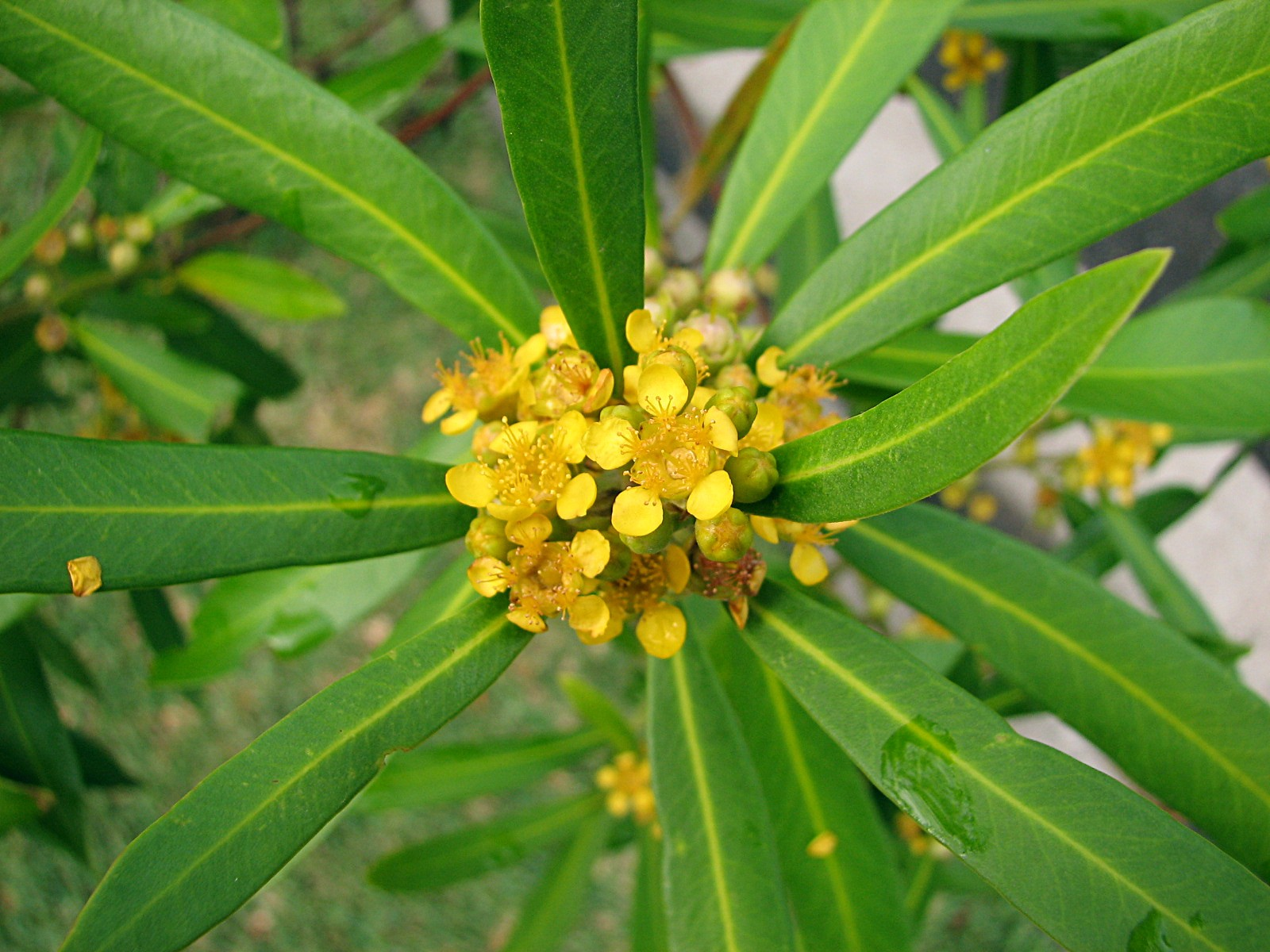

The flowers are bright yellow and have a distinctive and, to some, unpleasant odour. They attract honeybees as well as small native species of bee. They usually bloom in the late spring or early summer.

== Cultivation ==
Tristaniopsis laurina is cultivated as an ornamental tree by plant nurseries, for use in gardens and civic landscaping. It is popular because it is easy to grow and is a good shade tree. Many are planted as street trees, especially in Sydney.

== See also ==
- Tristaniopsis collina, hill water gum
- Syzygium francisii, giant water gum
- Syzygium crebrinerve, black water gum
