= Lordhowea insularis =

Scientific classification
- Kingdom: Plantae
- Clade: Tracheophytes
- Clade: Angiosperms
- Clade: Eudicots
- Clade: Asterids
- Order: Asterales
- Family: Asteraceae
- Genus: Lordhowea
- Species: L. insularis

Binomial name
- Lordhowea insularis (Benth.) B.Nord.

Synonyms
- Senecio insularis Benth.

Genus of flowering plants

Lordhowea insularis is a species of flowering plants in the groundsel tribe within the daisy family. It is endemic to Australia's Lord Howe Island in the Tasman Sea.

Lordhowea insularis is a tall, woody herb growing to 1–2 m in height with distinctive, deeply toothed leaves and clusters of yellow flowers. It is found on basalt soils on open, sunny ridges, as well as in light-canopied forest. Its seeds are wind-dispersed.
