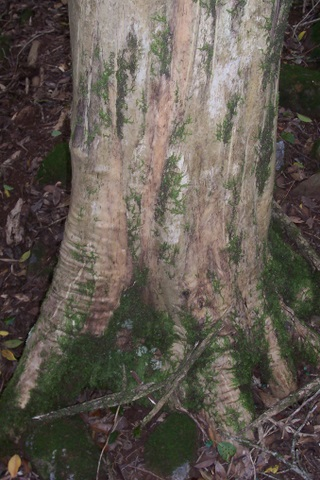
- Tristaniopsis collina at 1170 metres above sea level, Mount Royal, Australia

Conservation status
- Least Concern (IUCN 3.1)

Scientific classification
- Kingdom: Plantae
- Clade: Tracheophytes
- Clade: Angiosperms
- Clade: Eudicots
- Clade: Rosids
- Order: Myrtales
- Family: Myrtaceae
- Genus: Tristaniopsis
- Species: T. collina

Binomial name
- Tristaniopsis collina Peter G.Wilson & J.T.Waterh.

= Tristaniopsis collina =

Hill water gum

Species of tree

Tristaniopsis collina, known as hill water gum or hill kanuka, is a tree of eastern Australia.

The natural range of T. collina is from near Mount Gulaga (36° S) in the south of New South Wales to the border with the state of Queensland at the McPherson Range (28° S). The usual habitat is rainforest away from streams on shallow soils at high altitude. However, it can occasionally be seen at low altitudes such as at Seal Rocks and Chatswood West. T. collina is remarkably similar to the related T. laurina (Water Gum), but the latter species is strictly riparian.

== Description ==
Tristaniopsis collina is a small to medium tree, up to 35 m (115 ft) in height and up to 75 cm (30 in) in trunk diameter. The trunk is irregular, not cylindrical. The bark is grey or creamy, very thin, with papery fibres that come off to touch. Branchlets are coloured purple and angular in cross section. The alternate simple leaves are around 5 to 8 cm (2 to 3 in) long, with a long thin tip, and numerous oil dots of varying sizes. The midrib is sunken on the top surface, but raised below.

Yellow flowers form in cymes from November to January. The fruit is a dry capsule maturing from April to July. The fruit is practically identical to that of T. laurina. The winged seeds are 5 mm (0.2 in) long and 2 mm (0.08 in) broad.

== Conservation status ==
The IUCN Red List assesses the species as Least Concern.
