= Mount Cabrebald =

Mountain in New South Wales, Australia

Cabrebald
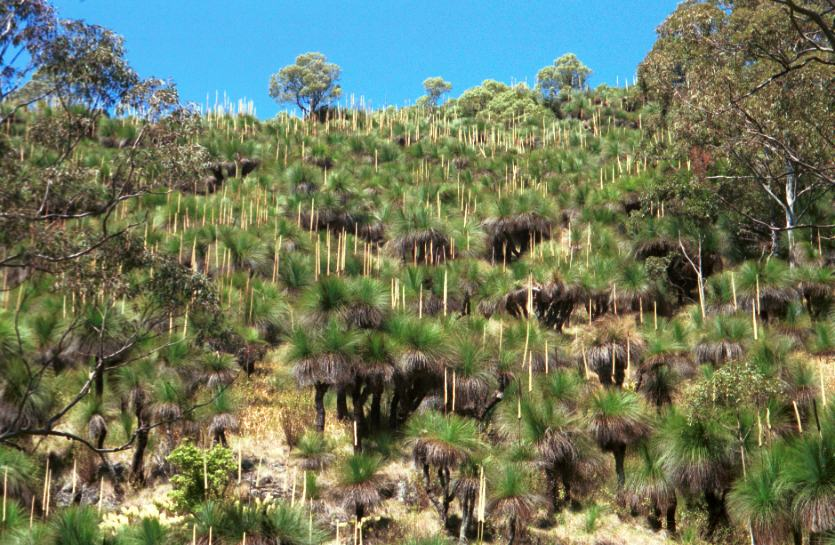
- Grass trees covering the northern side of Mount Cabrebald

Highest point
- Elevation: 1,017 m (3,337 ft)
- Coordinates: 32°08′57″S 151°23′01″E

Geography
- Location: Barrington Tops, New South Wales, Australia
- Parent range: Barrington Tops

Geology
- Rock age: Eocene

Mount Cabrebald is a mountain located within the Barrington Tops National Park, in the Upper Hunter region of New South Wales, Australia. With an elevation of 1,017 metres (3,337 ft) above sea level, the mountain is situated 200 kilometres (120 mi) north of Sydney, near Singleton.

Noted for the (previously) grass covered summit in a heavily forested area. Also for the 12-hectare (30-acre) Grass Tree forest, the tall eucalyptus forest and rainforest in fire free areas. The 360 degree views from the summit are considered some of the finest in this World Heritage region. Other plants found on the mountain include New England blackbutt, Australian red cedar and giant stinging tree.

== Gallery ==
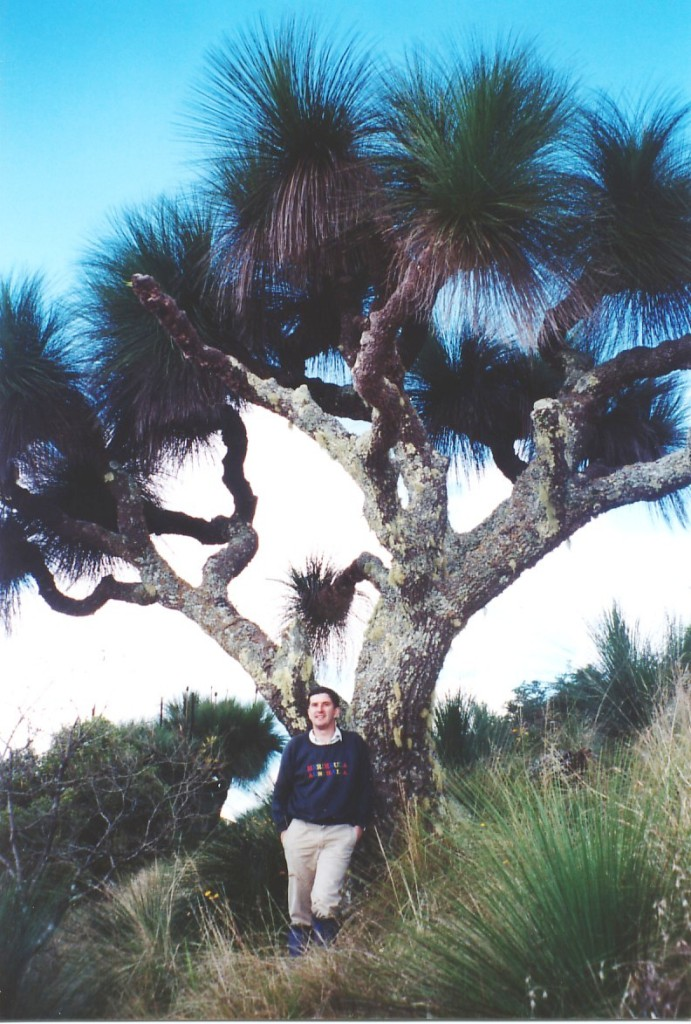
8 metre tall grass tree at Mount Cabrebald

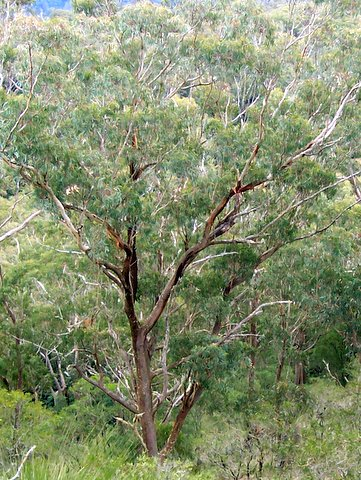
New England blackbutt at Mount Cabrebald

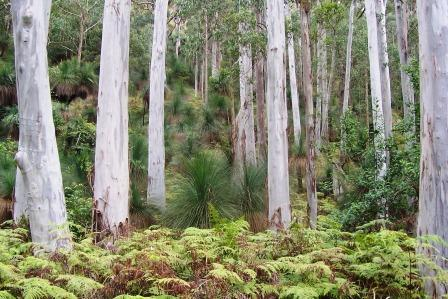
Sydney blue gums growing on red/brown soil at Mount Cabrebald

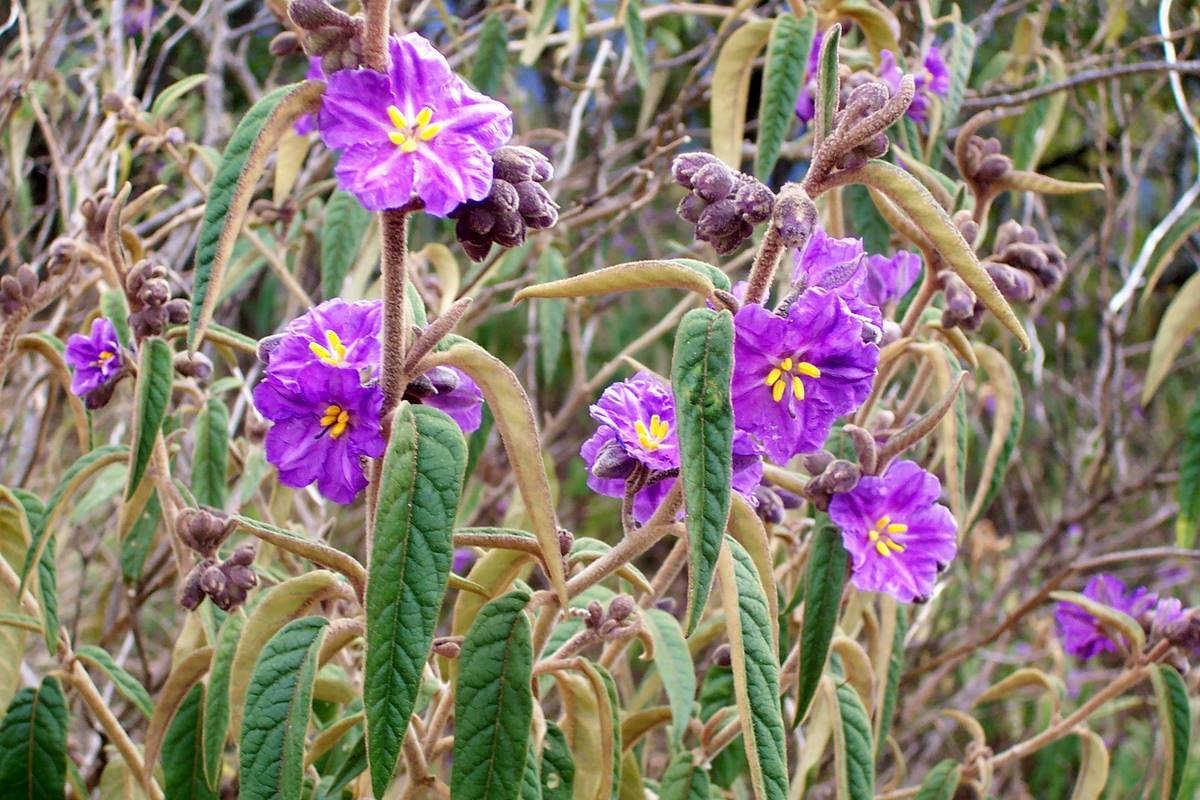
Flowering Solanum curvicuspe on the summit of Mount Cabrebald

== See also ==
- List of mountains of Australia § New South Wales
