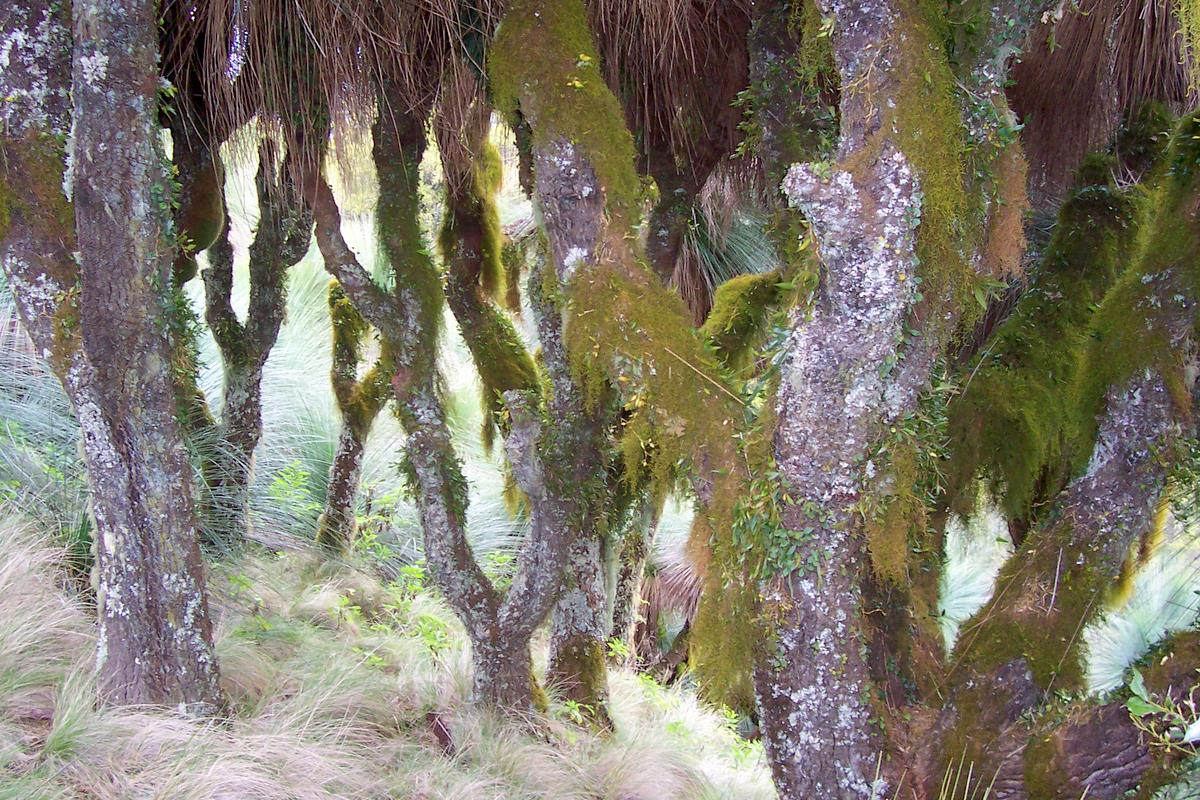
- Grass tree forest – Barrington Tops National Park, Australia

Conservation status
- Least Concern (IUCN 3.1)

Scientific classification
- Kingdom: Plantae
- Clade: Tracheophytes
- Clade: Angiosperms
- Clade: Monocots
- Order: Asparagales
- Family: Asphodelaceae
- Subfamily: Xanthorrhoeoideae
- Genus: Xanthorrhoea
- Species: X. glauca

Binomial name
- Xanthorrhoea glauca D.J.Bedford

Synonyms
- Xanthorrhoea australis R.Br.

= Xanthorrhoea glauca =

Species of flowering plant

Xanthorrhoea glauca is a large plant in the genus Xanthorrhoea, widespread in eastern Australia. The trunk can grow in excess of 5 metres tall, and may have many branches. It is occasionally seen in large communities in nutrient rich soils. The leaves are a grey or bluish glaucous green.

Two sub-species are recognised; subspecies angustifolia and glauca.

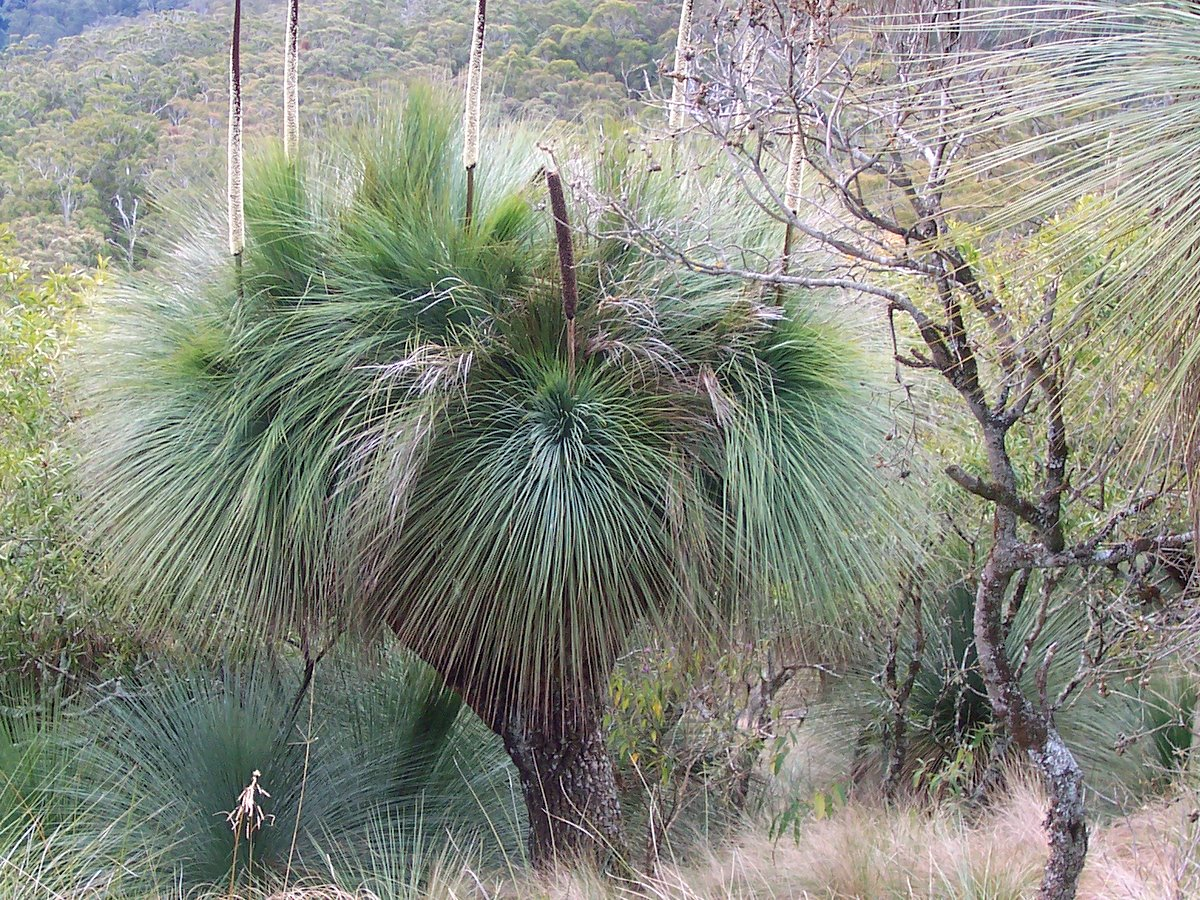

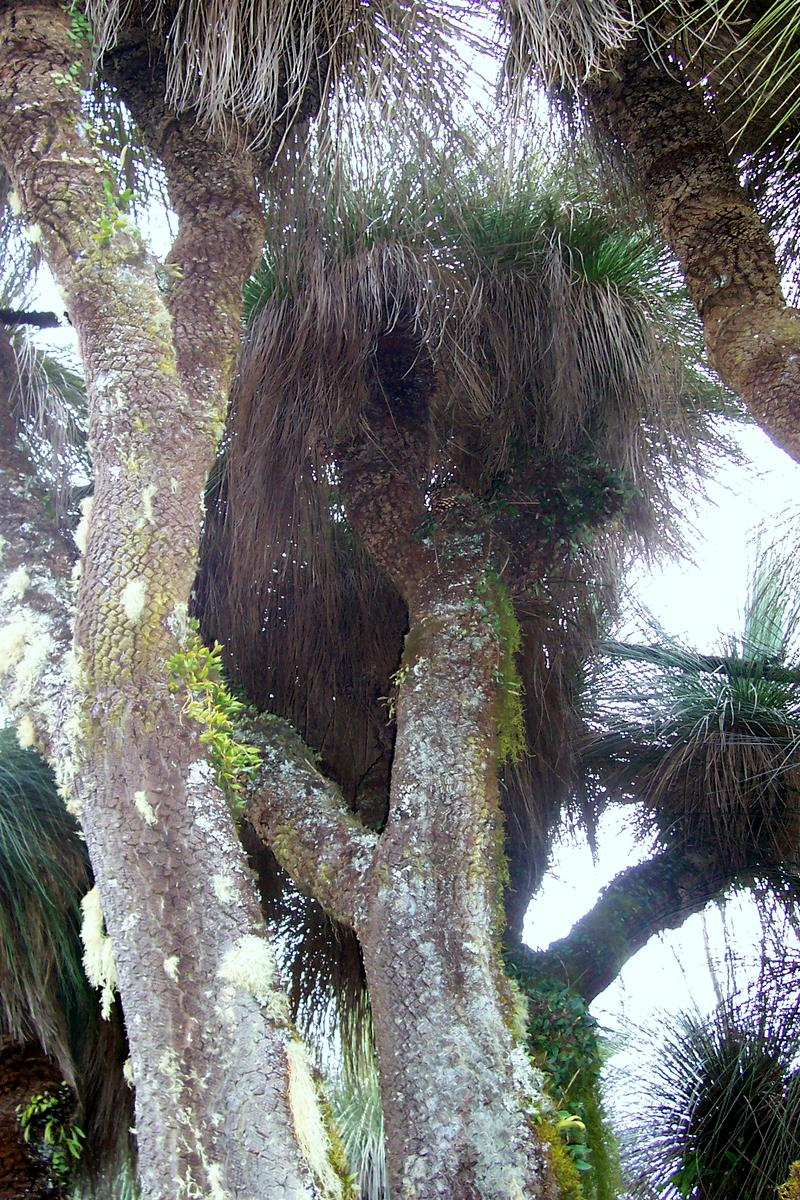

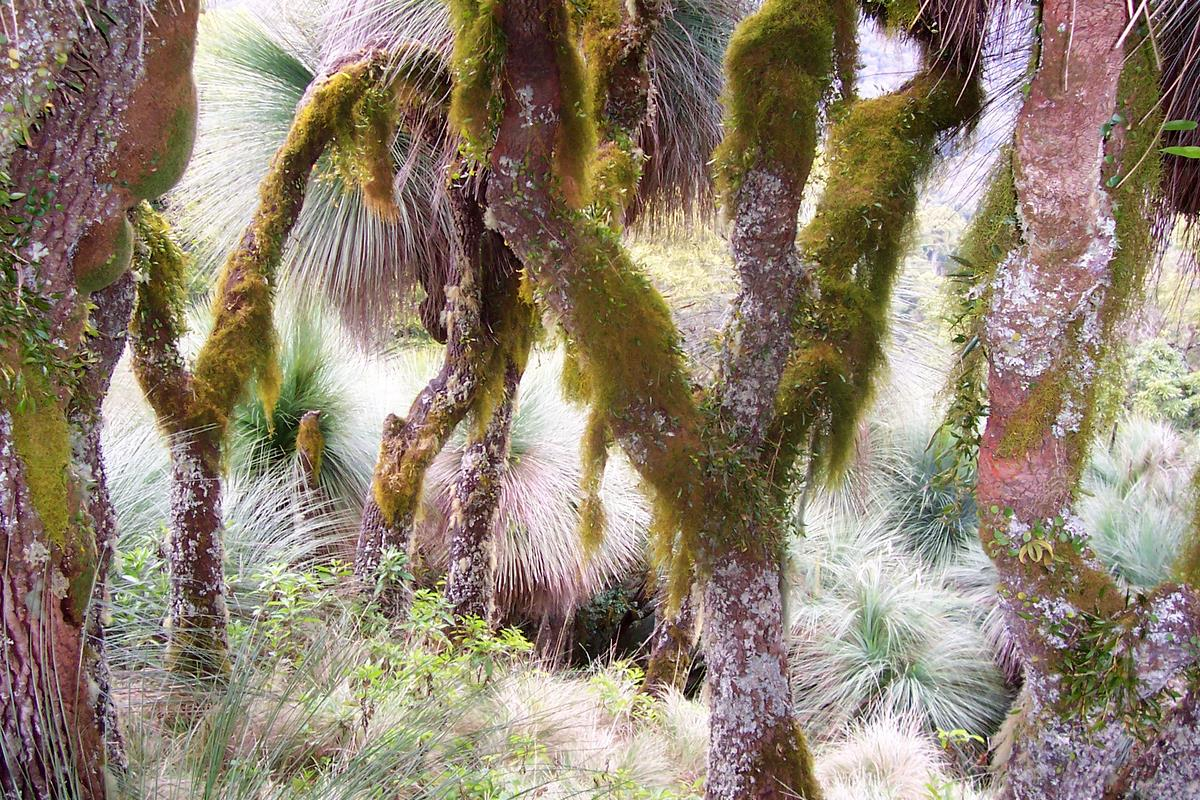

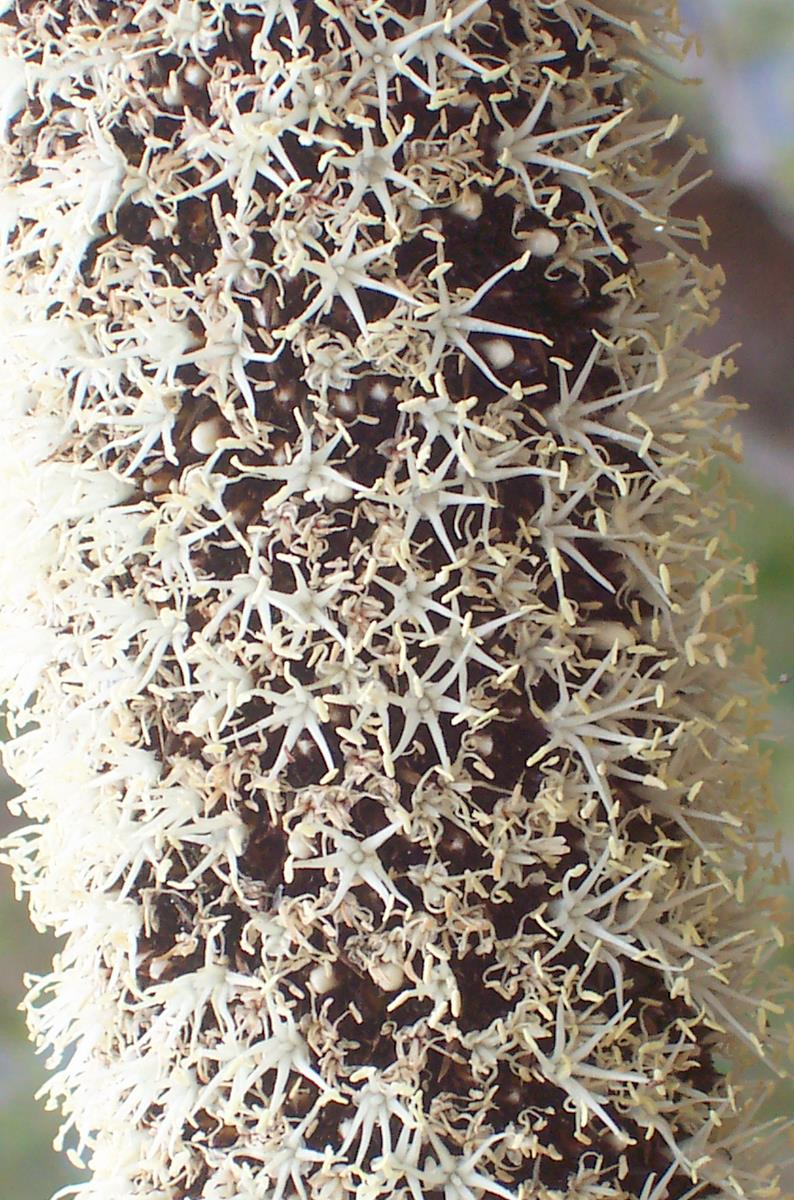

== Aboriginal (Ngunnawal) uses ==
The flower spike soaked in water makes a sweet drink. The growing part of the leaf stem and the white leaf bases can be eaten. The dried flower stems form a base for fire drills when making a fire. The resin from the base of the leaves is a glue used when making weapons and axes.
