= Chisholm, New South Wales =

Chisholm
- Suburb
- Coordinates: 32.758°S 151.626°E
- Country: Australia
- State: New South Wales
- Region: Hunter
- City: Maitland
- LGA: City of Maitland
- Location: 23 km (14 mi) NNW of Newcastle; 7 km (4.3 mi) SE of Maitland
- Established: 2007

Government
  - State electorate: Maitland
  - Federal division: Paterson

Area
  - Total: 6.371 km^{2} (2.460 sq mi)

Population
  - Total: 1,461 (2016 census)
  - Density: 229.32/km^{2} (593.94/sq mi)
- Postcode: 2322
- County: Northumberland
- Parish: Alnwick
Suburbs around Chisholm
Tenambit	Morpeth	Berry Park
East Maitland	Chisholm	Berry Park
Metford	Thornton	Thornton

Chisholm is a suburb in the City of Maitland, New South Wales, Australia. It is 23 kilometres (14 mi) north-northwest from Newcastle, and 7 kilometres (4 mi) south-east from Maitland. The traditional owners and custodians of the Maitland area are the Wonnarua people.

As at the 2016 Census, Chisholm had a population of almost 1,500. On 6 October 2011 it was announced that an additional 5,000 housing lots were to be released which estimated accommodation for an additional 15,000 residents.

== Population ==
In the 2016 Census, there were 1,461 people in Chisholm. 88.0% were born in Australia and 92.6% spoke only English at home. The most common responses for religion were Catholic 32.2%, Anglican 24.3% and No Religion 22.2%.

== Geography ==
Chisholm is located on a low ridge falling to the surrounding floodplain and wetlands, and further to the Hunter River. Chisholm is bordered by Raymond Terrace Road towards the south, and Mcfarlanes Road towards the east. Towards the north, and west Chisholm borders a natural watercourse, and wetlands.

== Transport ==
As of 27 January 2015 Chisholm is serviced by bus route 189 (Thornton to Stockland Green Hills via Chisholm), with stops at:

- Corner of Settlers Boulevard and Raymond Terrace Road (Thornton Side)
- Settlers Boulevard near the roundabout
- Grasshawk Drive at St. Aloysius Catholic Primary School

The closest train station is Thornton railway station.

== Facilities ==
The first school located in Chisholm is St. Aloysius Catholic Primary School. The closest public primary school is Thornton Public School, and the secondary school is Francis Greenway High School. In 2018 St. Bede's Catholic College opened to cater for the increased demand for Catholic Education in the Maitland region. St Bede's Catholic College is currently located next to St. Aloysius Catholic Primary School. A child care centre, St Nicholas Early Education, is located alongside St Aloysius. There are two other childcare centres in Chisholm.

In September 2022, Maitland City Council approved a development application submitted by Revelop to construct a shopping centre branded as Chisholm Plaza. Construction was scheduled to begin in April 2023, and continuing through to completion in December 2023. However, this never occurred. The centre has not been built yet and some residents are disapproving of this. It is hoped that construction will begin soon, although that may not happen. The Chisholm Plaza is said to boast two supermarkets, a bottle shop, cafes, restaurants, a tavern, and 40 lettable shop fronts for speciality retailers. In addition to these retail offerings the site will also house medical/allied health care facilities, another early education centre, and lifestyle facilities including a gym and swim school.
