= Dunmore Bridge =

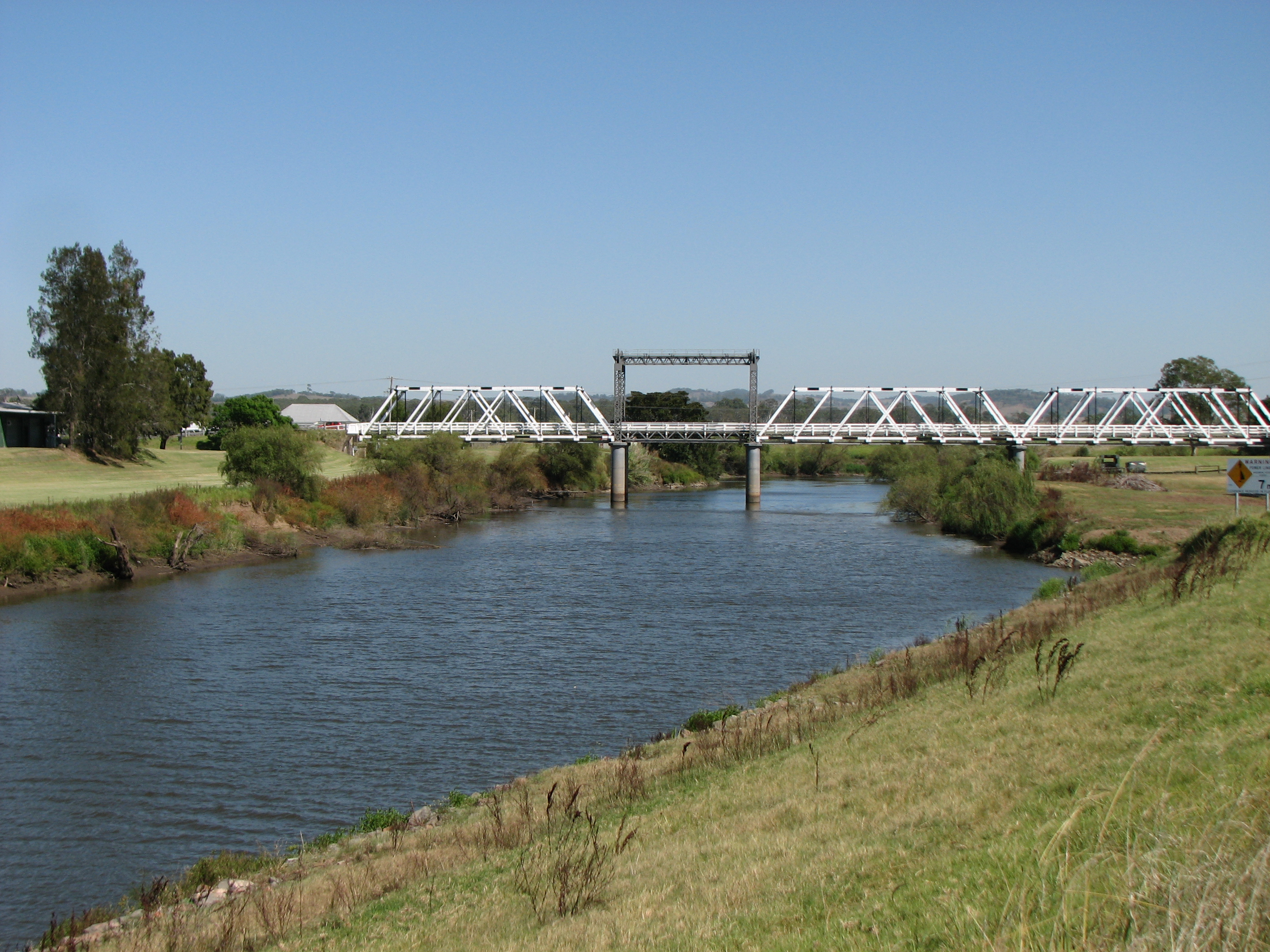
- Dunmore Bridge, Clarence Town Road, Woodville, NSW
- Coordinates: 32°40′49″S 151°36′20″E
- Carries: Clarence Town Road
- Crosses: Paterson River
- Locale: Woodville, New South Wales, Australia
- Owner: Transport for NSW

Characteristics
- Design: Allan truss
- Material: Timber
- Total length: 130.5 metres (428 ft)
- Width: 4.3 metres (14 ft)
- Longest span: 34.4 metres (113 ft)
- No. of spans: 3; 34.2 metres (112 ft); 34.4 metres (113 ft); 33.8 metres (111 ft)
- Clearance above: 4.6 metres (15 ft)

History
- Designer: Percy Allan
- Constructed by: S. McGill
- Construction cost: A£12,433
- Opened: 15 December 1899
- Replaces: Dunmore Bridge (1863)

New South Wales Heritage Register
- Official name: Dunmore Bridge over the Paterson River
- Type: State heritage (built)
- Designated: 20 June 2000
- Reference no.: 1467
- Type: Road Bridge
- Category: Transport - Land
- Builders: S. McGill, Morpeth

The Dunmore Bridge is a heritage-listed road bridge that carries Clarence Town Road across the Paterson River in Woodville, New South Wales, Australia. It was designed by Percy Allan and built in 1899 by Morpeth contractor, S. McGill. The property is owned by Transport for NSW. It was added to the New South Wales State Heritage Register on 20 June 2000.

== History ==
=== Timber truss bridges and Allan trusses ===
Timber truss road bridges have played a significant role in the expansion and improvement of the NSW road network. Prior to the bridges being built, river crossings were often dangerous in times of rain, which caused bulk freight movement to be prohibitively expensive for most agricultural and mining produce. Only the high priced wool clip of the time was able to carry the costs and inconvenience imposed by the generally inadequate river crossings that often existed prior to the trusses construction.

Timber truss bridges were preferred by the Public Works Department from the mid 19th to the early 20th century because they were relatively cheap to construct, and used mostly local materials. The financially troubled governments of the day applied pressure to the Public Works Department to produce as much road and bridge work for as little cost as possible, using local materials. This condition effectively prohibited the use of iron and steel, as these, prior to the construction of the steel works at Newcastle in the early 20th century, had to be imported from England.

Allan trusses were the first truly scientifically engineered timber truss bridges, and incorporate American design ideas for the first time. This is a reflection of the changing mindset of the NSW people, who were slowly accepting that American ideas could be as good as or better than European ones. The high quality and low cost of the Allan truss design entrenched the dominance of timber truss bridges for NSW roads for the next 30 years.

Percy Allan, the designer of Allan truss and other bridges, was a senior engineer of the Public Works Department, and a prominent figure in late 19th century NSW.

Timber truss bridges, and timber bridges generally were so common that NSW was known to travellers as the "timber bridge state".

=== Dunmore Bridge ===
The bridge was built in 1899 by S. McGill at a cost of A£12,433, with J. Ferguson as inspector in charge of the work, under principal assistant engineer of bridges Ernest de Burgh. It replaced the 1863 Dunmore Bridge, which had been damaged in a flood in January 1895, and by 1896 was reported to be so suffering from the "ravages of cobra, white ant and rot" that a new bridge was required. Contractor McGill also built the Morpeth Bridge and the Hinton Bridge nearby. The new bridge was opened on 15 December 1899 by Walter Bennett MP, the Member for Durham.

The lifting mechanism for the lift span has since been removed. The timber truss spans were replaced in 2013 with the same design, except replacing the wrought iron vertical tension members with steel and using blackbutt timber instead of grey ironbark.

== Description ==
Dunmore Bridge is an overhead braced Allan type timber truss road bridge. It has three timber truss spans, each of 34.2 metres (112 ft), 34.4 metres (113 ft), and 33.8 metres (111 ft). It has an internal steel truss lift span of 17.8 metres (58 ft). There is a single approach span at each end giving the bridge an overall length of 130.5 metres (428 ft). The bridge has a height restriction of 4.6 metres (15 ft) because of the overhead bracing between the tops of the trusses.

The main spans of the superstructure are supported by twin cast iron cylinder piers. The bridge provides a single lane carriage way with a minimum width of 4.3 metres (14 ft) and a footpath. An Armco guardrail protects vehicular traffic, and a timber post and rail fence is provided on the footpath. The lifting mechanism is no longer in service following the removal of the lifting ropes and counter weights.

The bridge was reported to be in good condition as at 13 September 2005. It has been well maintained by the RTA.

== Heritage listing ==
Completed in 1899, the Dunmore bridge is a representative example of an Allan truss road bridge, and is one of three surviving overhead braced timber truss road bridges in NSW. The bridge also has a lift span to allow river traffic under it, which is a rare feature that also contains much technical significance and information about engineering technology of the late 19th century. Most of its engineering details are intact, and the bridge is in good condition. As a timber truss road bridge, it has many associational links with important historical events, trends, and people, including the expansion of the road network and economic activity throughout NSW, and Percy Allan, the designer of this type of truss.

Allan trusses were third in the five-stage design evolution of NSW timber truss bridges, and were a major improvement over the McDonald trusses which preceded them. Allan trusses were 20% cheaper to build than McDonald trusses, could carry 50% more load, and were easier to maintain. The people who live in the area around the bridge (Woodville and the Hunter region) value the bridge highly, and as such it has social significance. Dunmore Bridge is located in the Hunter region, which has 15 historic bridges each constructed before 1905, and it gains heritage significance from its proximity to the high concentration of other historic bridges in the area. In 1998 there were 38 surviving Allan trusses in NSW of the 105 built, and 82 timber truss road bridges survive from the over 400 built. The Dunmore bridge is a rare and representative example of Allan timber truss road bridges, and is assessed as being Nationally significant, primarily on the basis of its technical and historical significance.

Dunmore Bridge over the Paterson River was listed on the New South Wales State Heritage Register on 20 June 2000 having satisfied the following criteria.

The place is important in demonstrating the course, or pattern, of cultural or natural history in New South Wales.

Through the bridge's association with the expansion of the NSW road network, its ability to demonstrate historically important concepts such as the gradual acceptance of NSW people of American design ideas, and its association with Percy Allan, it has historical significance.

The place is important in demonstrating aesthetic characteristics and/or a high degree of creative or technical achievement in New South Wales.

The bridge exhibits the technical excellence of its design, as all of the structural detail is clearly visible. In the context of its landscape it is visually attractive. As such, the bridge has moderate aesthetic significance.

The place has a strong or special association with a particular community or cultural group in New South Wales for social, cultural or spiritual reasons.

Timber truss bridges are prominent to road travellers, and NSW has in the past been referred to as the "timber truss bridge state". Through this, the complete set of bridges gain some social significance, as they could be said to be held in reasonable esteem by many travellers in NSW. The Dunmore bridge is valued by the people of the Hunter region.

The place possesses uncommon, rare or endangered aspects of the cultural or natural history of New South Wales.

Highly rare - only combination of overhead Allan truss and lift span

The place is important in demonstrating the principal characteristics of a class of cultural or natural places/environments in New South Wales.

Highly representative of overhead braced Allan trusses: in 1998 there were 38 surviving Allan trusses in NSW of the 105 built, and 82 timber truss road bridges survive from the over 400 built.

== See also ==
- List of road bridges in New South Wales
- List of bridges in Australia
