= Tenambit =

- Suburb
- Coordinates: 32°44′34″S 151°36′24″E
- Country: Australia
- State: New South Wales
- Region: Hunter
- City: Maitland
- LGA: City of Maitland
- Location: 161 km (100 mi) N of Sydney; 31 km (19 mi) NW of Newcastle; 5 km (3.1 mi) E of Maitland

Government
  - State electorate: Maitland
  - Federal division: Paterson

Area
  - Total: 2.7 km^{2} (1.0 sq mi)
- Elevation: 20 m (66 ft)

Population
  - Total: 2,901 (2016 census)
  - Density: 853/km^{2} (2,210/sq mi)
- Time zone: UTC+10 (AEST)
  - Summer (DST): UTC+11 (AEDT)
- Postcode: 2323
- County: Northumberland
- Parish: Maitland
Suburbs around Tenambit
East Maitland	Raworth, Morpeth	Morpeth
East Maitland	Tenambit	Berry Park
East Maitland	East Maitland, Metford	East Maitland

Tenambit is a suburb of the city of Maitland, a city and local government area in the Hunter Region of New South Wales, Australia. It is located approximately 5 kilometres (3 mi) east of the Maitland CBD. The suburb is on sloping ground, which decreases from approximately 40 metres (131 ft) AMSL in the west to 10 m (33 ft) AMSL at the eastern edge of the suburb. At the 2016 census it had a population of approximately 2,900.

== St Egwin's Church ==
St Egwin's is a church under the Anglican Diocese of Newcastle. It was erected c. 1890.

== Sport ==
=== Rugby Union ===
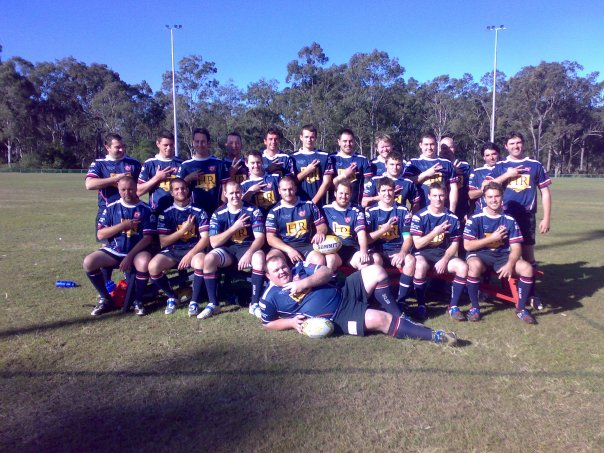
The East Maitland Eagles in 2009

Tenambit is home to the East Maitland Eagles, who play in the Newcastle and Hunter Rugby Union. Their playing strip consists of red, blue and white.

Reformed in 2007, the team reached the semi-finals in 2007, 2008 and 2009, also taking out the minor and major premierships in C grade in 2010.

The club has also produced two Bert McGregor Medalists - Craig Clark in 2007 and Adam Hewitt in 2010. (The Bert McGregor Medal is awarded to the Best & Fairest player in 2nd Division (C Grade)).
