= Morpeth Bridge =

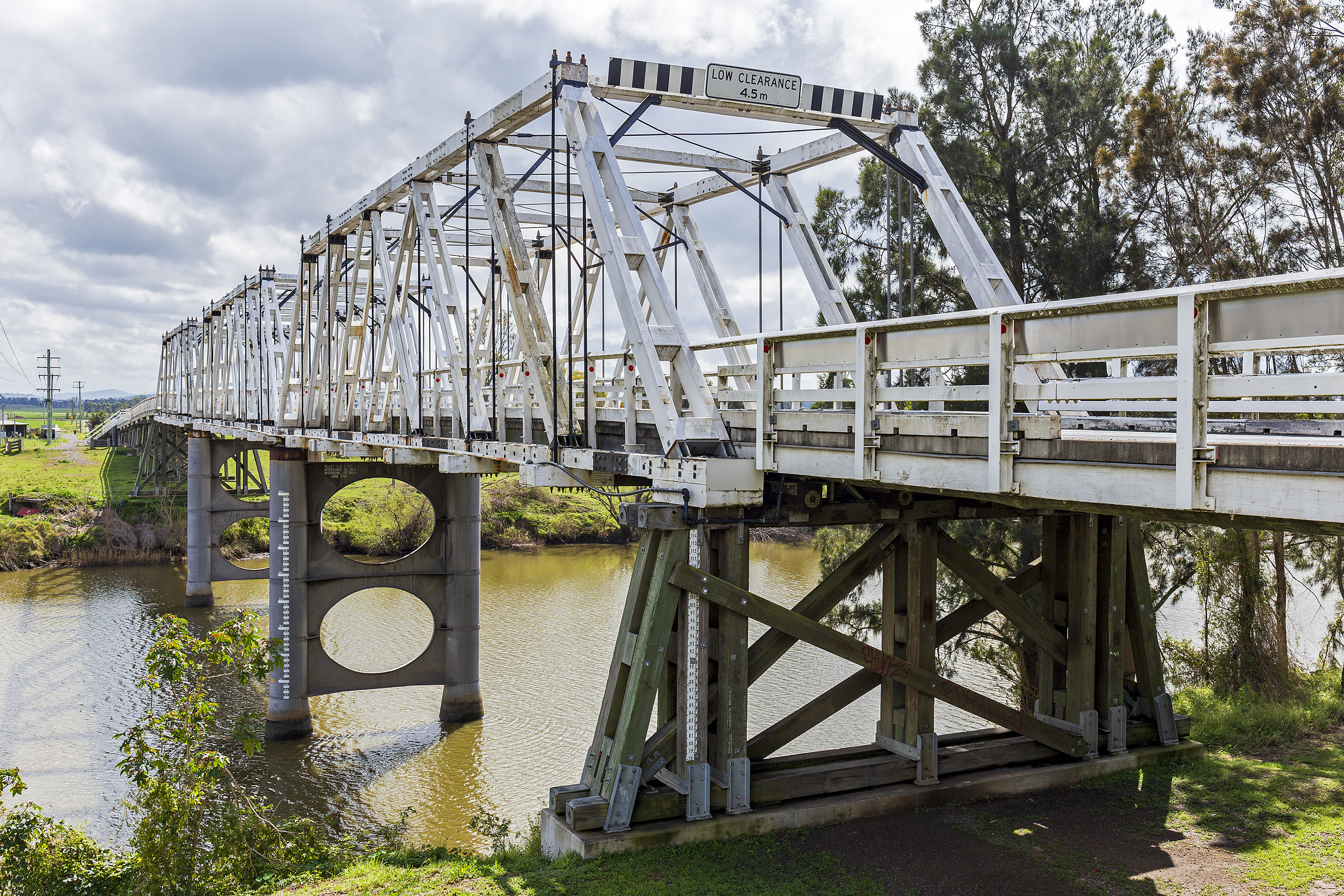
- Morpeth Bridge in September 2019
- Coordinates: 32°43′26″S 151°37′36″E
- Crosses: Hunter River
- Locale: Morpeth, New South Wales, Australia
- Owner: Transport for NSW

Characteristics
- Design: Allan truss
- Material: Iron, Wood
- Trough construction: Iron cylinders
- Total length: 820 ft (250 m)
- Longest span: 3× 110 ft (34 m) + numerous 35 ft (11 m)
- No. of spans: 1 + 3 main + 15
- Piers in water: 2
- Clearance above: 12 ft (3.8 m)
- No. of lanes: 2

History
- Designer: Percy Allan
- Constructed by: Samuel McGill
- Fabrication by: Mort's Dock & Engineering Company—bridge cylinders
- Construction start: 1896
- Construction end: 1898
- Construction cost: A£8,260
- Opened: 15 June 1898

Statistics

New South Wales Heritage Register
- Official name: Morpeth Bridge over the Hunter River
- Type: state heritage (built)
- Designated: 20 June 2000
- Reference no.: 1476
- Type: Road Bridge
- Category: Transport – Land

Morpeth Bridge is a heritage-listed road bridge over the Hunter River at Morpeth, New South Wales, Australia. It was designed by Percy Allan and built from 1896 to 1898 by Samuel McGill. It is also known as Morpeth Bridge over the Hunter River. The property is owned by Transport for NSW.

Opened on 15 June 1898, the Morpeth Bridge is a timber trestle bridge employing Allan trusses. It has two central iron cylinder span supports fabricated by Mort's Dock & Engineering Company. It is managed by Transport for NSW. The bridge was added to the New South Wales State Heritage Register on 20 June 2000.

== History ==
Morpeth was part of a land grant made to Lieutenant Edward Charles Close by Governor Brisbane in 1821. Influenced by its desirable location on the Hunter River and the realisation of the area's immense potential, by the 1830s Morpeth had evolved from a riverside forest to a frontier town and busy river port. During its time as a major agricultural and industrial hub Morpeth contributed to the development of the entire Hunter Valley. A punt service was established across the river from Queen's Wharf to Phoenix Park and Hinton to the north.

Local lobbying for a bridge over the Hunter River at Morpeth began as early as March 1885, when the Morpeth Progress Committee drafted a petition calling for the construction of a bridge across the Hunter to connect with Phoenix Park to the north. By August 1885 the local member, Robert Wisdom proposed that the community should request that the Department of Public Works construct two bridges (the second being over the Paterson River at Hinton) which would better serve the people of the region as it would:

"supply a long necessary public want to the residents of Morpeth, Hinton, Seaham, Clarence Town, East and West Maitland and surrounding districts..."

Tenders for the construction of the Morpeth Bridge over the Hunter River were called for in the Government Gazette in June 1896. The call requested tenders for the:

"erection of a Timber truss Bridge on Iron Piers over the Hunter River at Morpeth; also alternative tenders for a bridge with composite Truss spans on Timber Piers."

In August 1896 it was announced that the tender was won by S. McGill of Inverell. The estimated cost of its construction was £9,000, the actual final cost was £9,239/11/5. Construction was delayed in part by flooding along the Hunter River which occurred in February on 1897; as a result of this flooding scaffolding erected for the bridge was washed away.

The Morpeth Bridge was opened in June 1898. It, along with the then proposed Hinton Bridge over the Paterson River, was intended to provide a route between Morpeth, Hinton, Wallalong, Phoenix Park and Largs. The bridge replaced a hand-powered punt and was built as a National Work. The bridge opening ceremony was attended by J.H. Young, the Colonial Secretary and several Members of Parliament. Attendees from the general public were reminded during the accompanying speeches that they were, to a degree, indebted to their political representatives for the existence of the Bridge, and that they could repay the debt by voting accordingly at the then upcoming general elections. The Bridge opening was described as a "very successful and enjoyable one" - entertainment included the Morpeth Brass band and a long procession of school children.

The Bridge was described as consisting of:

"three timber truss spans, of 100ft. 3in. each, resting on iron cylinder river piers and timber land piers, with fourteen timber beam spans of 35 feet each, extending on a grade 1 to 30 to the low-lying lands of Phoenix Park. The roadway is 18 feet in width, and in order to clear the tramway on the Morpeth side it was necessary to keep the Bridge 16 feet above flood level."

The bridge was considered by the Department of Public Works to be an important construction, and it was noted in the annual report for 1898 that the "question of affording access to the town of Morpeth from the low-lying lands of Phoenix Park had long been under consideration". A photograph of the bridge was included with the Annual Report for 1898 showing the three truss spans and iron cylinder piers. As a result of the erection of the Bridge, navigation of the Hunter River above the Bridge was limited and Queens Wharf in Morpeth fell into disrepair.

== Description ==
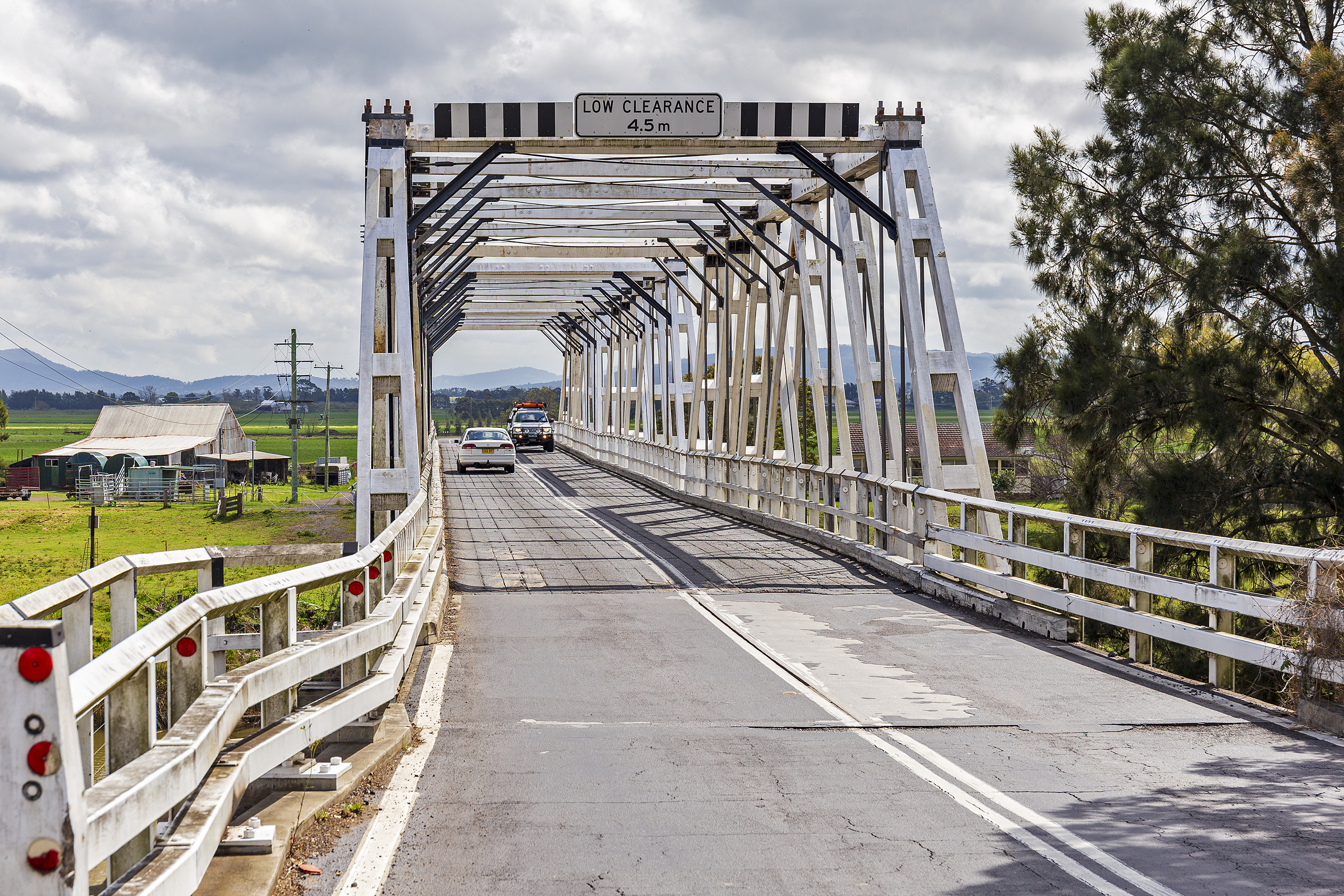
Bridge deck, September 2019

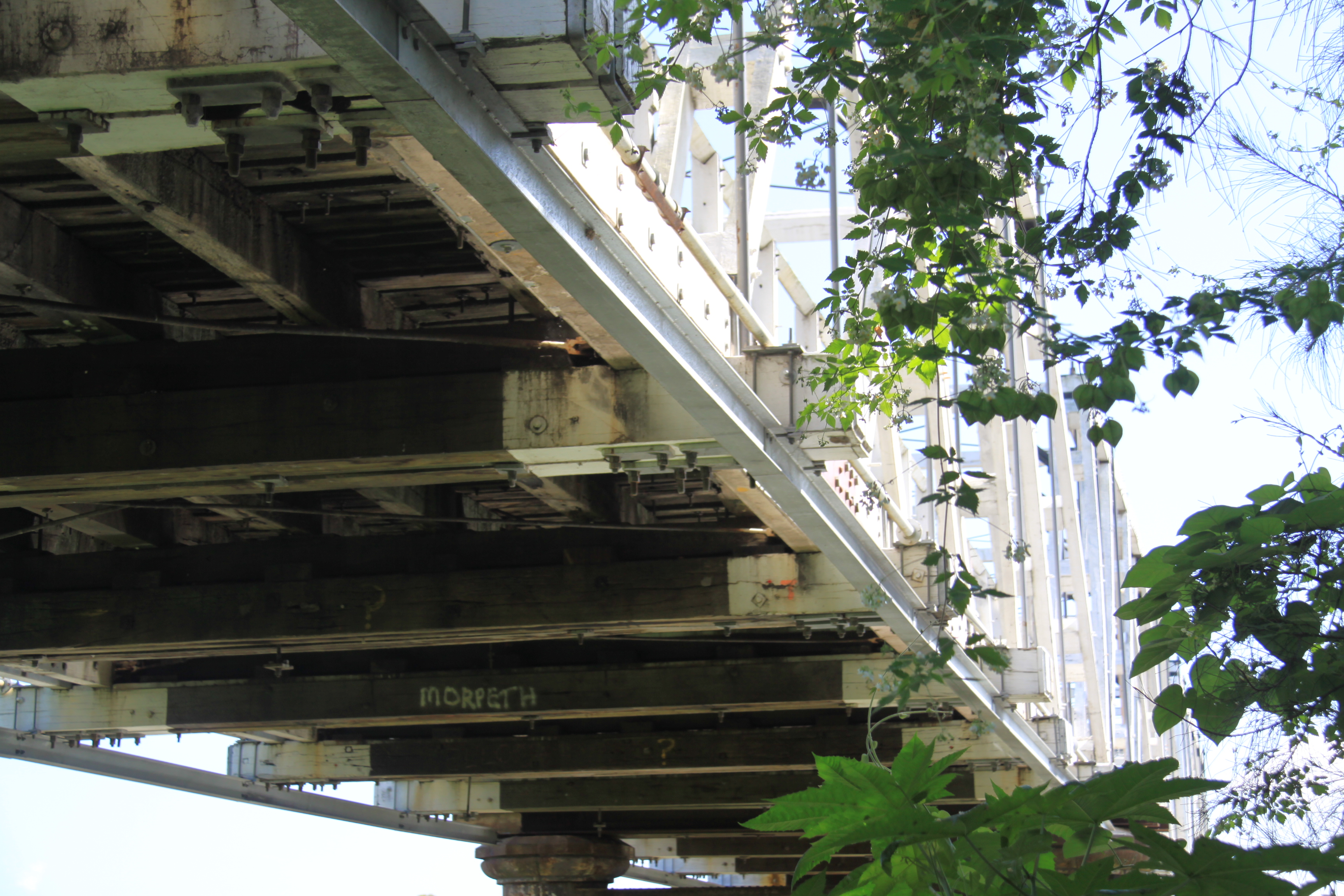
Underside of the bridge, 2009

The bridge has three 33.6-metre (110 ft) timber Allan truss spans, flanked by timber beam spans supporting concrete decking units. The roadway width is 5.5 metres (18 ft) and the main spans are supported on twin iron cylinder piers. The approaches have timber piers.

Some of the features of the modified Howe truss developed by Allan are the use of paired timber elements throughout, which allowed any component to be replaced while the bridge remained in service, without the need to temporarily prop the trusses from below. The truss consists of timber top and bottom chords, timber compression diagonals and tension rods as verticals; the tension rods could be used to adjust the geometry and counteract shrinkage. Furthermore, cast-iron shoes at all joints ensured proper truss action and a good transfer of member forces at the joints.

Allan's design was lighter and more economical than the McDonald truss it replaced. They were also designed to be more accessible for painting and repair, and to use shorter lengths of timber which were much easier to obtain and to manoeuvre during construction.

Flood evacuation stairs are located on the northern approach adjacent to Pier 9.

Evidence of former Morpeth branch railway line may be present in the vicinity of span 1 on the Morpeth town side.

=== Modifications and dates ===
There has been a continual replacement process of defective timbers over the lifetime of the bridge; however it can be considered as having its original fabric.

Between 2008 and 2011 the bridge was upgraded by RMS to increase the load capacity in line with current traffic requirements. The timber planking on the truss spans and approach spans was replaced with Stress Laminated Timber decking and concrete decking units respectively. The timber ordinance railing was replaced with a visually similar steel railing in order to comply with current safety codes. The seven northernmost approach spans were replaced with a raised embankment delineated by textured concrete retaining walls. Flood evacuation stairs were removed from Pier 13 and reinstated at Pier 9 in 2013.

Architectural lighting was installed in 2021 ahead of the Morpeth Bicentenary. The lights were turned on for the first time on 20 November 2021. The lights are switched on nightly 60 minutes before sunset until 10:30pm.

The lights are able to be set to various lighting sequences based on nominated commemorative days and events.

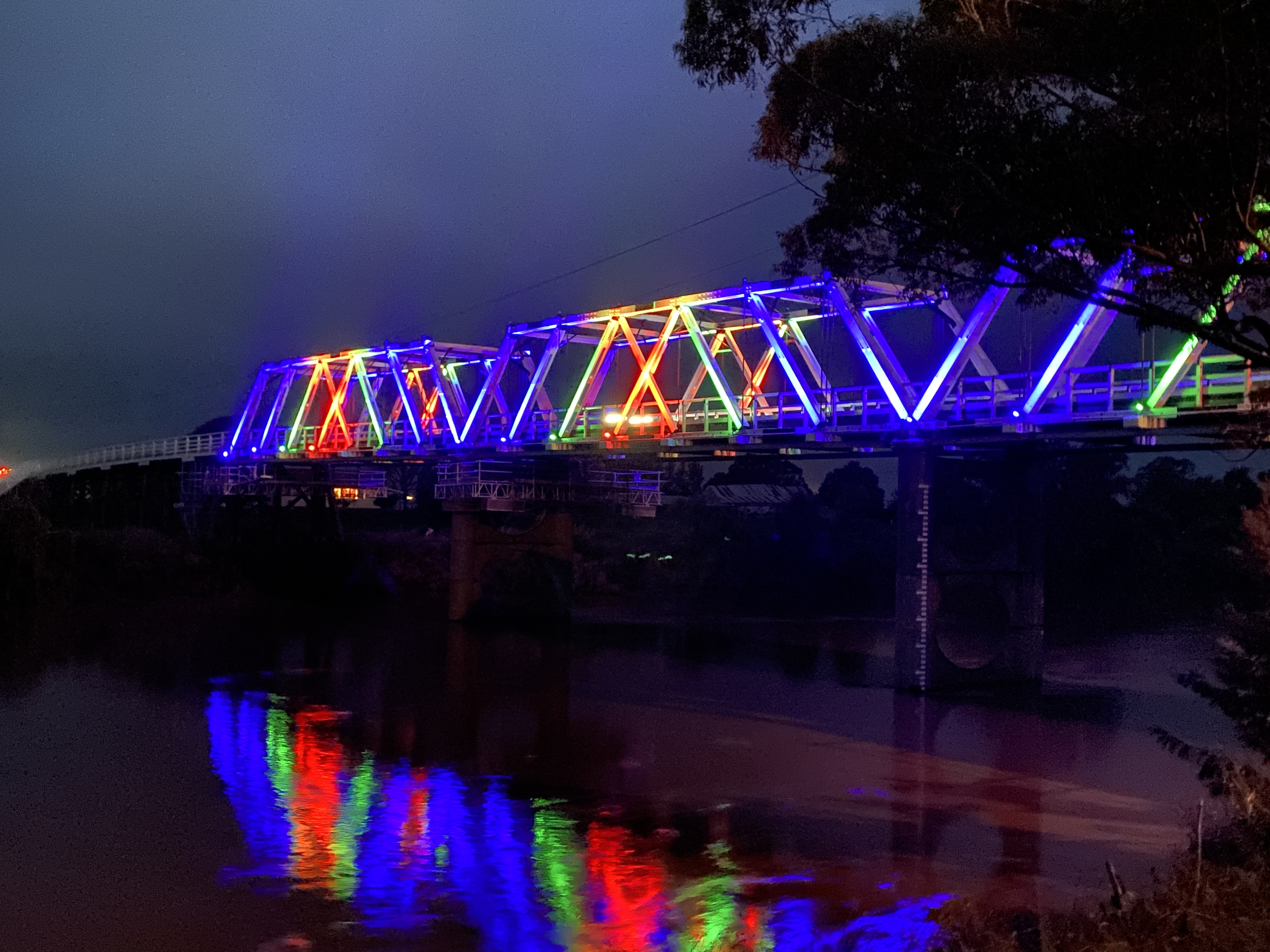
Morpeth Bridge, NSW lit up at night time in November 2021. Photo by Mitchell Griffin

=== Further information ===
There are concerns about modern heavy truck loads on the bridge, as those loads exceed what was expected when the bridge was originally designed.

== Heritage listing ==
Completed in 1898, the Morpeth Bridge is a substantial and rare overhead braced Allan type timber truss road bridge that has provided an important river crossing since its completion. As a timber truss road bridge, it has many associational links with important historical events, trends, and people, including the expansion of the road network and economic activity throughout New South Wales, and Percy Allan, the designer of this type of truss.

Allan trusses were third in the five stage design evolution of New South Wales timber truss road bridges, and were a major improvement over the McDonald trusses which preceded them. Allan trusses were 20% cheaper to build than McDonald trusses, could carry 50% more load, and were easier to maintain. Only six examples of overhead braced Allan type timber road bridges were built of these only two remain, two under RMS control (Morpeth Bridge and Dunmore Bridge) while Hampden Bridge was under the control of Wagga Wagga City Council until its demolition in 2014. Technically they represented the high water mark of timber bridge construction in Australia; the top braces enabled the construction of 156-foot (48 m) spans on the Macleay River Bridge, the greatest ever achieved. In 2013 there are 24 surviving Allan trusses in New South Wales of the 104 built. From an aesthetic perspective, the dominance of the truss grouping and associated approach bridges provides an important counterpoint to the perpendicularly aligned main street of Morpeth for which it serves as a "gateway". The town and bridge are within a heritage conservation zone. On the northern approaches of the bridge are a small flight of stairs which serve as a dedicated and purpose-built flood evacuation access route, this feature is unique to Morpeth Bridge amongst the bridges in the Hunter Valley.

Morpeth Bridge was listed on the New South Wales State Heritage Register on 20 June 2000 having satisfied the following criteria.

The place is important in demonstrating the course, or pattern, of cultural or natural history in New South Wales.

Through the Bridge's association with the expansion of the New South Wales road network, its ability to demonstrate historically important concepts such as the gradual acceptance of New South Wales people of American design ideas, and its association with Percy Allan, it has historical significance.

The town of Morpeth was a historic Hunter River port. It remains an historic town and is well complemented by the Bridge.

By the standards of this criterion, Morpeth Bridge can be considered to be of state significance.

The place has a strong or special association with a person, or group of persons, of importance of cultural or natural history of New South Wales's history.

Morpeth Bridge represents the efforts and motivation of the local community to lobby for a series of permanent crossings on the road north from Morpeth to Hinton and beyond in the Lower Hunter Valley. The bridge was built by S. McGill, whose construction teams were also responsible for building the nearby Dunmore Bridge at Woodville and Hinton Bridge, both of which are listed on the SHR. Designed by Percy Allan who is regarded as one of Australia's foremost bridge engineers being associated in the design and construction of 583 bridges during his 49-year career (1878–1927) in the New South Wales Department of Public Works.

The place is important in demonstrating aesthetic characteristics and/or a high degree of creative or technical achievement in New South Wales.

The aesthetic significance of the Bridge is manifested in two ways; the first is the design and construction excellence that the Bridge exhibits and the second is its visual appeal including the relationship between the Bridge and its visual setting and the way that they complement each other.

Morpeth Bridge is an imposing and distinctive structure in its setting. It is a clearly visible and dominant component of the Morpeth townscape. It is encapsulated in the setting of a modified landscape of roads, gardens and buildings which it played a part in forming.

The place has a strong or special association with a particular community or cultural group in New South Wales for social, cultural or spiritual reasons.

Timber truss bridges are prominent to road travellers and New South Wales has in the past been referred to as the "timber truss bridge state". Through this, the complete set of bridges gain some social significance, as they could be said to be held in reasonable esteem by many travellers in New South Wales.

The Bridge has significance to the local community as an important item of heritage which historically supported the economic and social development of the district and provided an important permanent road link between Morpeth and towns to the north. The Bridge was only built due to intense lobbying on the part of the Morpeth Progress Association.

The place has potential to yield information that will contribute to an understanding of the cultural or natural history of New South Wales.

Morpeth Bridge is assessed to have technical significance as an Allan truss and represents some major technical developments that were made in timber truss bridge designs by the New South Wales Public Works Department.

Morpeth Bridge is one of only three large Allan truss style bridges complete with full overhead bracing remaining of six built and is the only triple span, overhead braced Allan truss not to incorporate a lift span.

The place possesses uncommon, rare or endangered aspects of the cultural or natural history of New South Wales.

Morpeth Bridge is one of 24 surviving Allan trusses in New South Wales of the 104 built. Of this truss type Morpeth Bridge is one of only 6 large Allan truss style bridges complete with full overhead bracing built and one of only two remaining open to traffic.

Morpeth Bridge exhibits a rare relationship to an adjacent historic townscape setting and is unique amongst the bridges of the Hunter Valley for featuring flood evacuation stairs.

The place is important in demonstrating the principal characteristics of a class of cultural or natural places/environments in New South Wales.

The Bridge, with its distinctive overhead braced spans is regarded as representative of this type of rarely constructed (in Australia) type of timber truss bridge.

When the bridge was built in 1898 Phoenix Park had no levee and was frequently flooded, even more so than it is at present. Flooding was a characteristic of Phoenix Park and the farmers relied on the stairs as a last resort flood escape by walking along the high river bank at a time when wading through floodwater to the end of the bridge would have been hazardous, if not impossible; The flood evacuation stairs are therefore representative of the farm culture of the district.

== See also ==
- Historic bridges of New South Wales
- List of bridges in Australia
