= Morpeth, New South Wales =

Morpeth
- Suburb
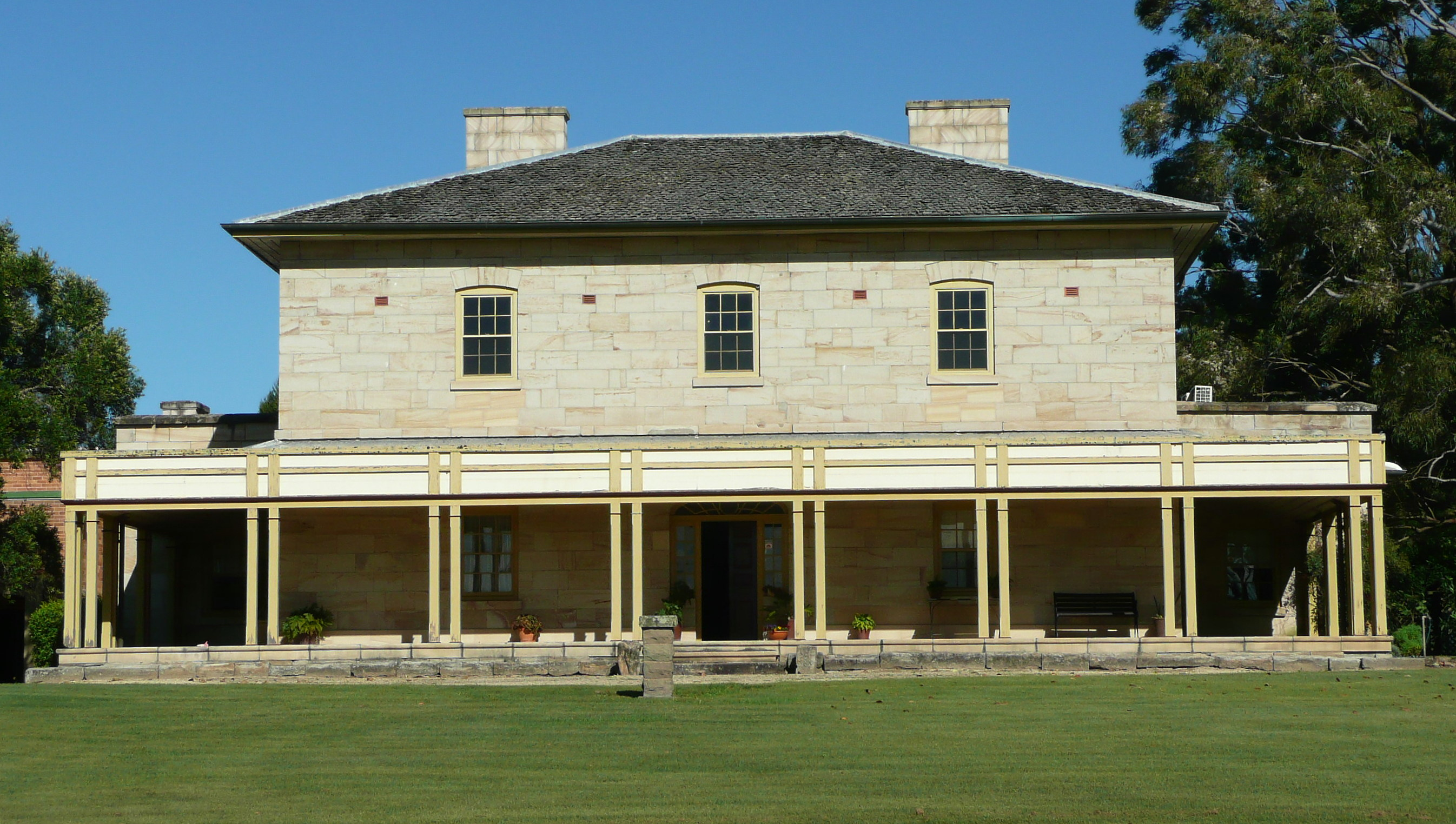
- Closebourne House, Morpeth

- Coordinates: 32°43′34″S 151°37′54″E
- Country: Australia
- State: New South Wales
- Region: Hunter
- City: Maitland
- LGA: City of Maitland
- Location: 165 km (103 mi) N of Sydney; 35.2 km (21.9 mi) NNW of Newcastle; 7.9 km (4.9 mi) ENE of Maitland
- Established: 1821

Government
  - State electorate: Maitland
  - Federal division: Paterson

Area^{Note3}
  - Total: 4.8 km^{2} (1.9 sq mi)
- Elevation^{Note2}: 15 m (49 ft)

Population
  - Total: 1,403 (2016 census)^{Note1}
  - Density: 188/km^{2} (490/sq mi)
- Time zone: UTC+10 (AEST)
  - Summer (DST): UTC+11 (AEDT)
- Postcode: 2321
- County: Northumberland
- Parish: Alnwick
Suburbs around Morpeth
Raworth	Phoenix Park	Hinton
Raworth	Morpeth	Berry Park
Tenambit	Chisholm	Berry Park

Morpeth is a suburb of the city of Maitland in the Hunter Region of New South Wales, Australia. It is on the southern banks of the Hunter River at the border between the City of Maitland and Port Stephens Council LGAs. The major population centre, where almost all residents of the suburb reside, is the historical town of Morpeth which takes its name from Morpeth, Northumberland, near Newcastle upon Tyne, in England.

== History ==
The traditional owners and custodians of the Maitland area are the Wonnarua people.

The town of Morpeth was initially created through the private actions of Edward Charles Close, who selected a property of 1,000 hectares and developed it as a river port from 1831-1841. The lieutenant built his house, known as Closebourne, on the property. A two-storey Georgian home made of sandstone, the house became an episcopal residence from 1848-1912.

The river port grew steadily throughout the 1830s. St James's Church, located on Tank Street, was built from 1837 to 1840 and was partly designed by John Horbury Hunt is now a Local Government Heritage listing. A major merchant at this time was James Taylor, who built a bond store circa 1850 near the bridge that is now heritage-listed. Morpeth Court House was built circa 1861 in a Greek Revival style and a local police station followed in 1879. The construction of the Great Northern Railway in 1857, bypassing Morpeth, meant that Newcastle developed as the regional port. Morpeth became less significant commercially, but still survived as a township with its own history and heritage.

Today, the town is a popular tourist destination due to its many historical buildings and river bank setting.

== Heritage listings ==
Morpeth has a number of heritage-listed sites, including:

- 102 Main Road: Morpeth Bridge
- Morpeth Road: Morpeth House and Closebourne House
- 19 Tank Street: St James' Anglican Church
- 90 Swan Street: Morpeth Railway Station

== Gallery ==
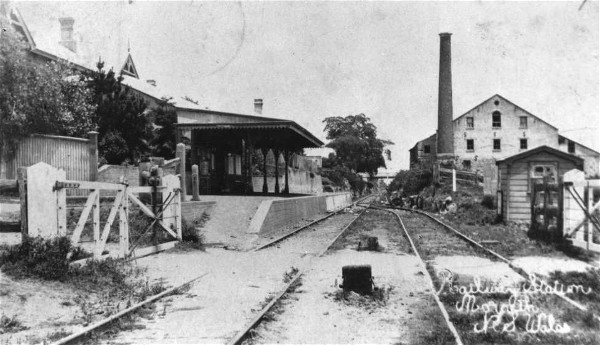
Morpeth Station, 1954

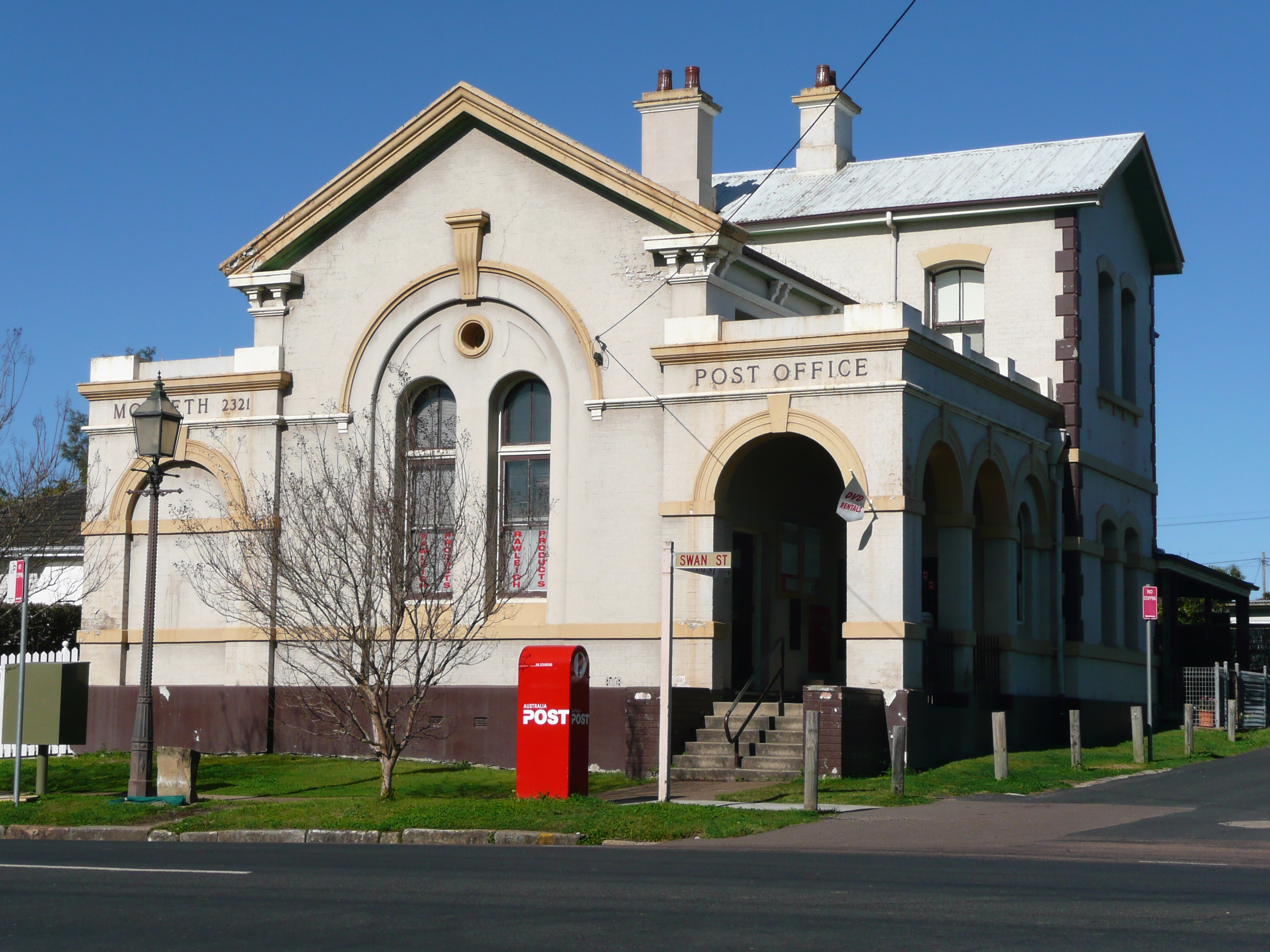
Morpeth Post Office, Swan Street

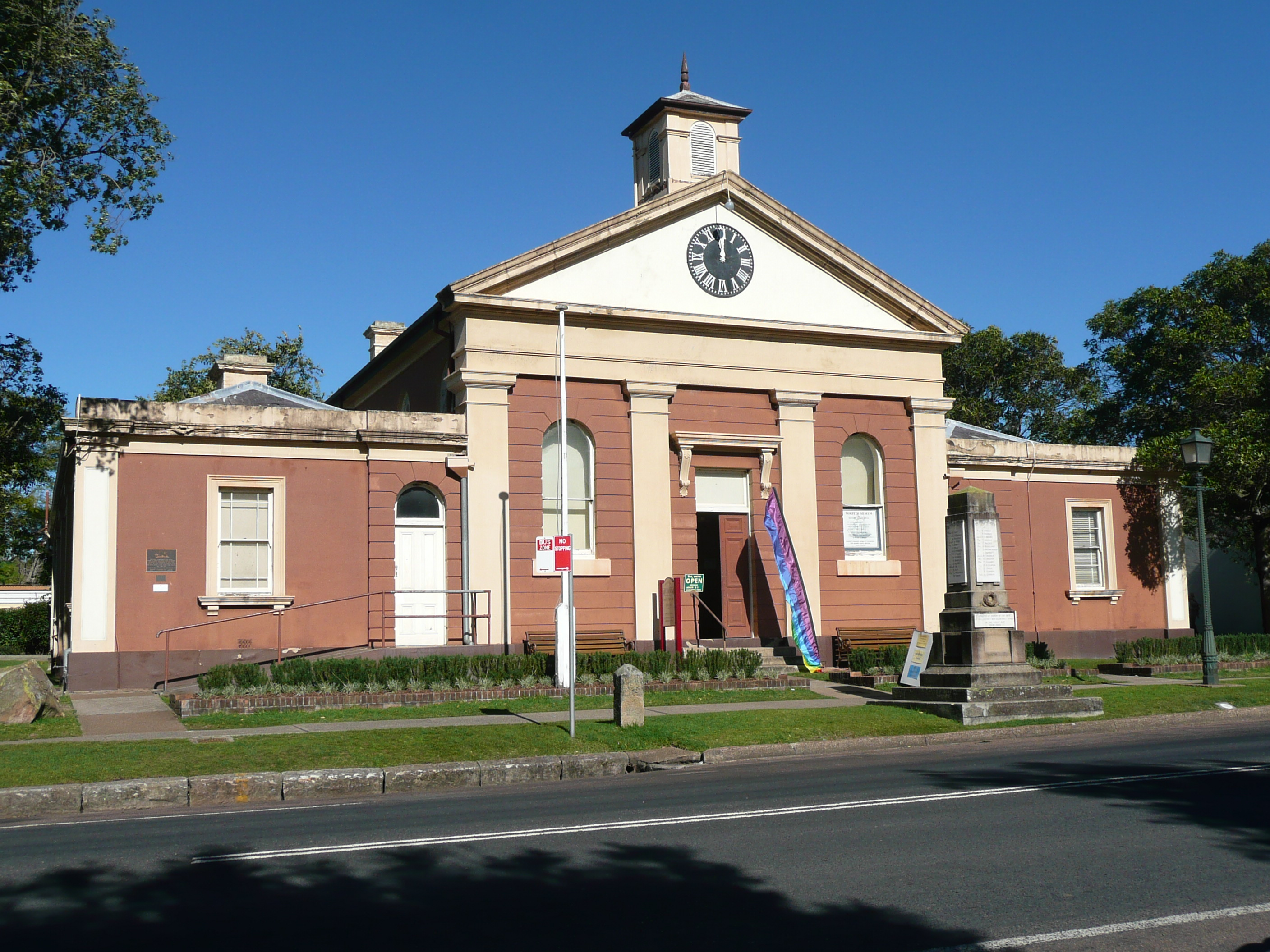
Old Court House, Swan Street

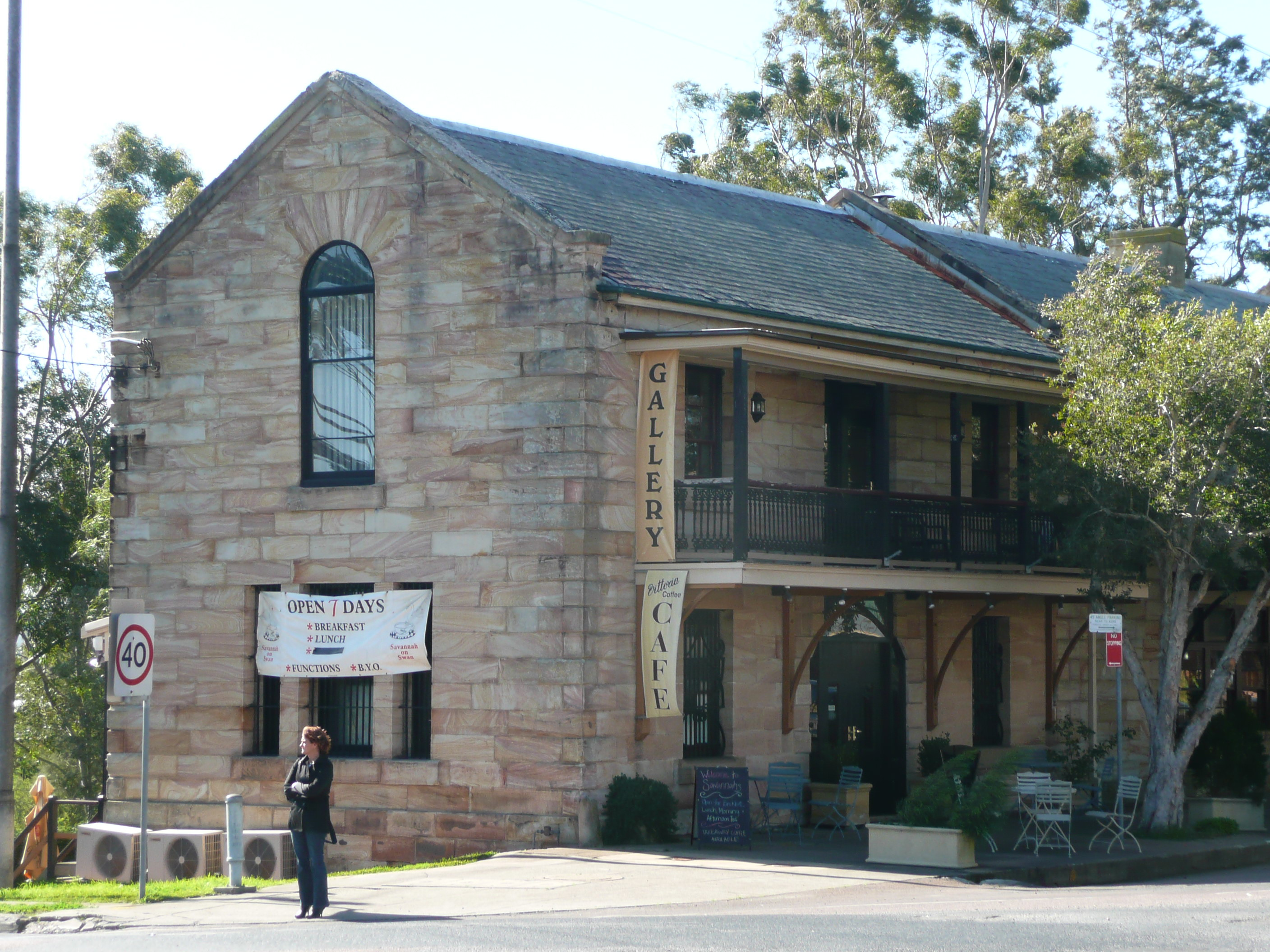
Morpeth Bond Stores, Swan Street

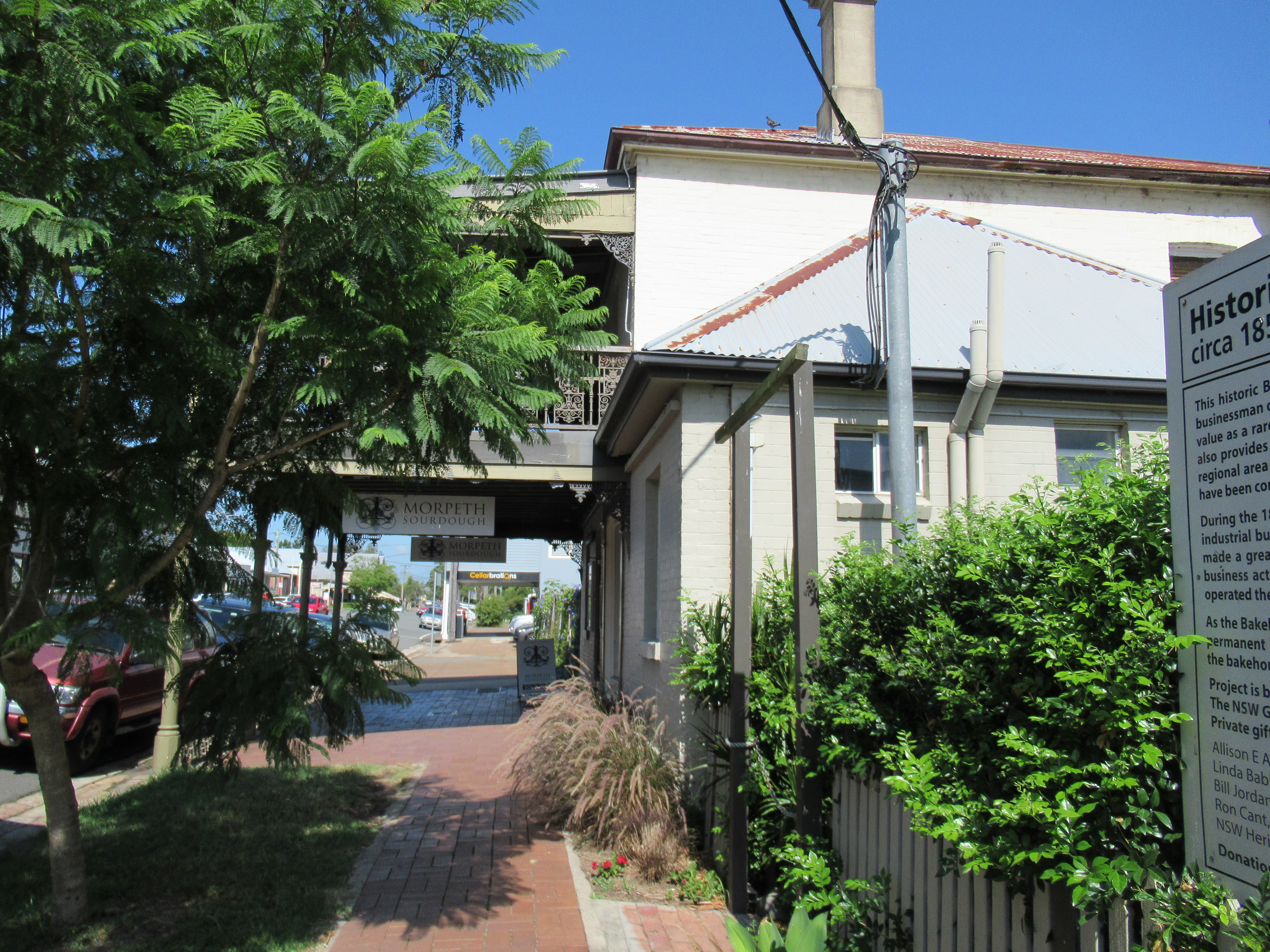
Arnott Bakehouse, Swan Street

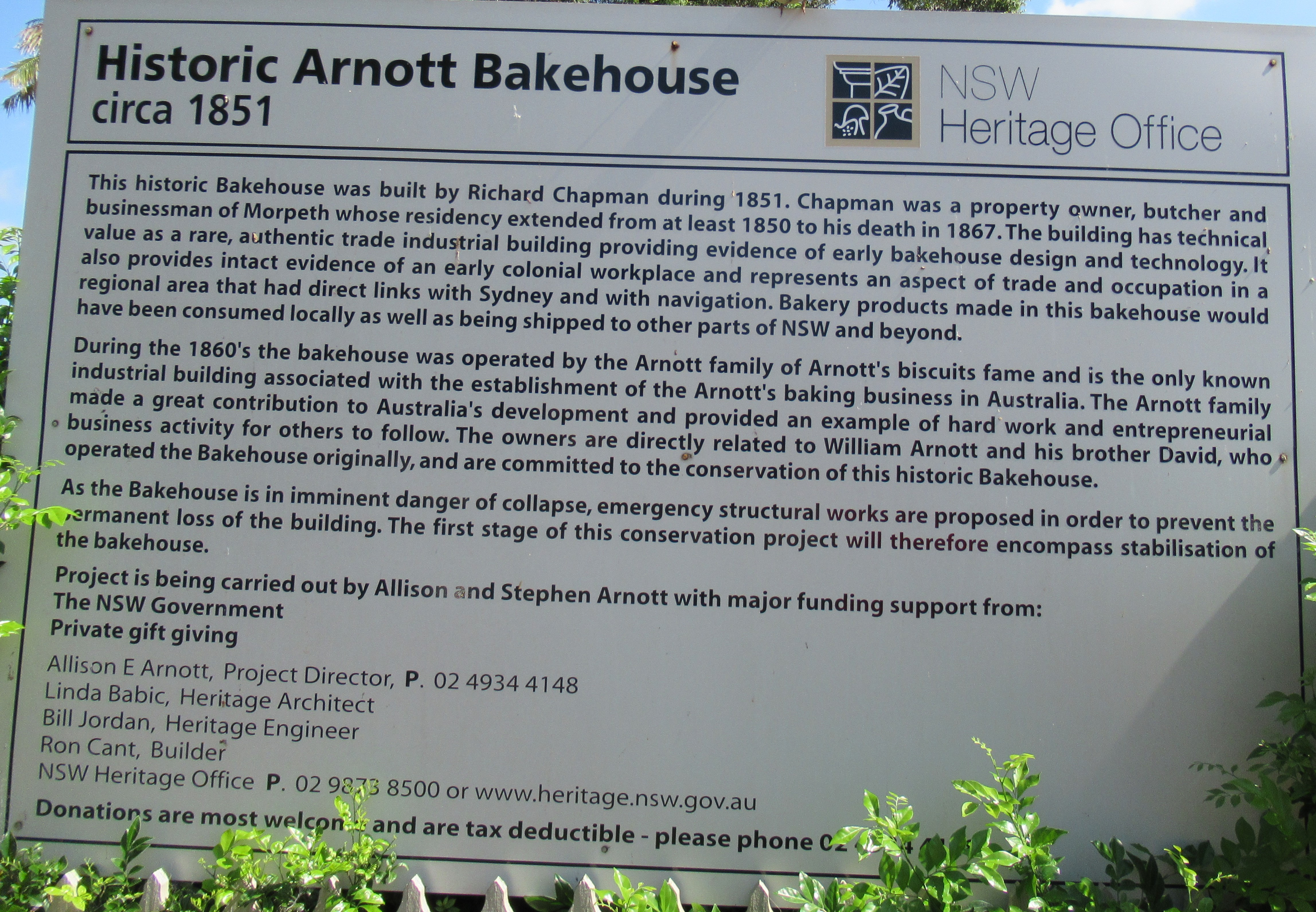
Arnott Bakehouse plaque

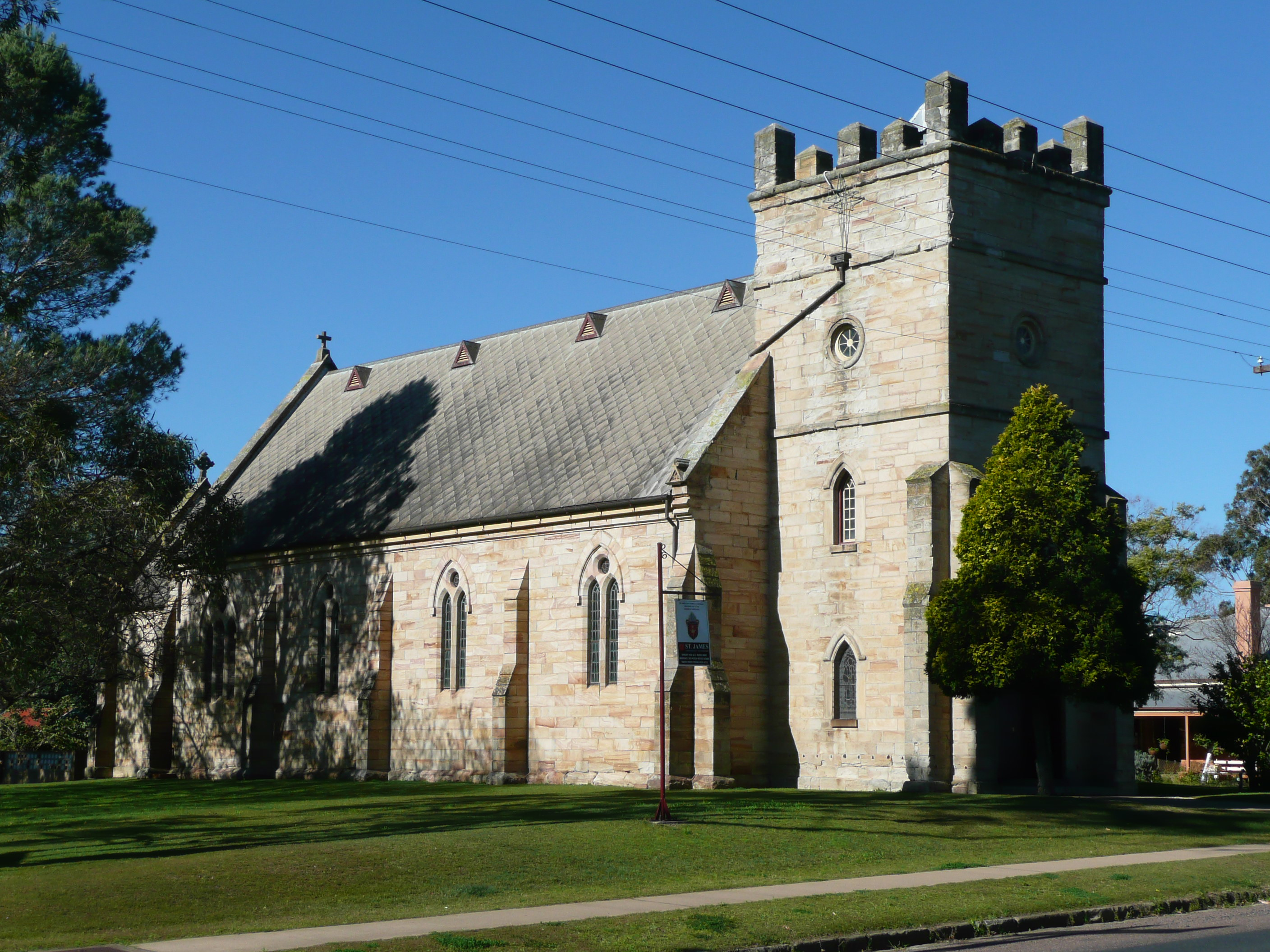
St James's Church (1840), Tank Street

== Notes ==
1. The Australian Bureau of Statistics Census Collection District of Morpeth only includes the township. It excludes persons living on some rural properties close to the township in the remainder of the suburb as well as in newer residential areas of the suburb near the township. This means that the actual population of Morpeth is slightly higher than shown.
2. Average elevation of the suburb as shown on 1:100000 map 9232 NEWCASTLE.
3. Area calculation is based on 1:100000 map 9232 NEWCASTLE.
