= Berry Park =

Rural locality in New South Wales

- Town
- Coordinates: 32°44′24″S 151°39′24″E
- Country: Australia
- State: New South Wales
- Region: Hunter
- LGA: City of Maitland
- Location: 11 km (6.8 mi) W of City of Maitland; 170 km (110 mi) N of Sydney

Government
  - State electorate: Maitland
  - Federal division: Paterson

Population
  - Total: 127 (2016 census)
- Postcode: 2321
- County: Northumberland
- Parish: Alnwick
Localities around Berry Park
| Morpeth | Hinton | Duckenfield |
| Chisholm | Berry Park | Millers Forest |
| Chisholm | Thornton | Millers Forest |

Berry Park is a small rural locality within the City of Maitland, New South Wales. It is located approximately 132 km from the capital Sydney covering an area of 8.811 square kilometres.

== Population ==
In 2016 Berry Park population was 127 people with a median age of 46. 84.3 were born in Australia and 2.3% spoke German. 35.3% Catholics, 16.5% no religion (so described), 15.0% Anglican, 12.0% not stated and 6.8% Uniting Church.
