= Peoples Savings Bank =

Bank building in Cedar Rapids, Iowa

- People's Savings Bank
- U.S. National Register of Historic Places
- U.S. Historic district – Contributing property
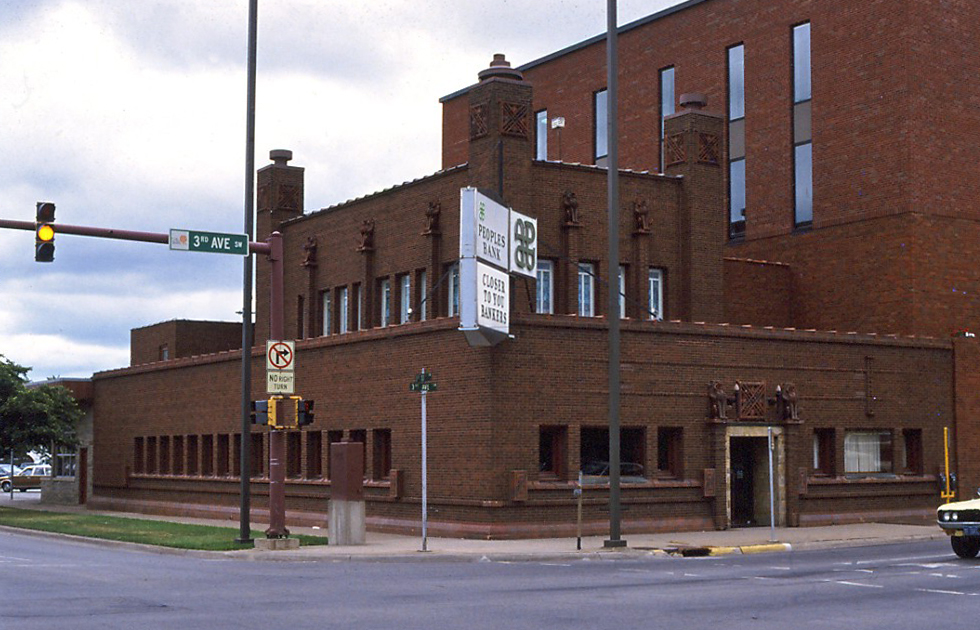

- Location within Iowa Location within the United States
- Location: 101 3rd Avenue, SW; Cedar Rapids, Iowa
- Coordinates: 41°58′27.78″N 91°40′18.95″W
- Built: 1911
- Architect: Louis Sullivan
- Architectural style: Late 19th and Early 20th Century American Movements
- Part of: West Side Third Avenue SW Commercial Historic District (ID14000323)
- NRHP reference No.: 78001241
- Added to NRHP: March 29, 1978

The Peoples Savings Bank in Cedar Rapids, Iowa, was designed by Louis Sullivan. It was the second of a number of small "jewel box" banks in Midwestern United States towns designed by Sullivan during 1907 to 1919. It was built in 1911, and it was individually listed on the National Register of Historic Places in 1978. In 2014, it was included as a contributing property in the West Side Third Avenue SW Commercial Historic District.

== History ==
Sullivan's initial design was completed in the summer of 1909 but was rejected by the bank as being too expensive. The following year, his Cedar Rapids clients, spearheaded by the bank Vice-President Fred Shaver (whom local Cedar Rapids tradition has Sullivan designing a remodeling of his residence), continued their negotiations with him and an agreement was reached. Sullivan began this study of the bank and its functions beginning with the large banking room and working out from there, while reducing the cost of the structure by cutting back on the terra cotta ornamentation. The building was finished in 1912.

The prominent architectural critic Montgomery Schuyler said of it at the time that, "The building is thus clearly designed from within outward. The exterior is the envelope of the interior reduced to its very simplest expression." (Wilson and Robinson)

The bricks for the exterior of the building were produced in 15 different shades, producing, as Sullivan remarked, "the effect of an antique Oriental rug." The interior of the building includes clerestory walls of glass with murals by Allen Philbrick depicting life in rural Iowa.

This bank was the last commission that George Elmslie assisted Sullivan on. Shortly after its completion, Elmslie joined the Minnesota partnership of Purcell & Feick, the new firm being named Purcell, Feick & Elmslie.

Peoples Bank was purchased around 1989 by Minneapolis-based Norwest Corporation, which a few years later acquired Wells Fargo and took on its name. The Third Avenue building continued to serve as the Cedar Rapids/Marion area's main Wells Fargo branch, but because of its proximity to the Cedar River, it was impacted by the Iowa flood of 2008. As such, the main bank is currently closed. Wells Fargo's Web site says the adjacent motor bank is operating, however.

== Gallery ==
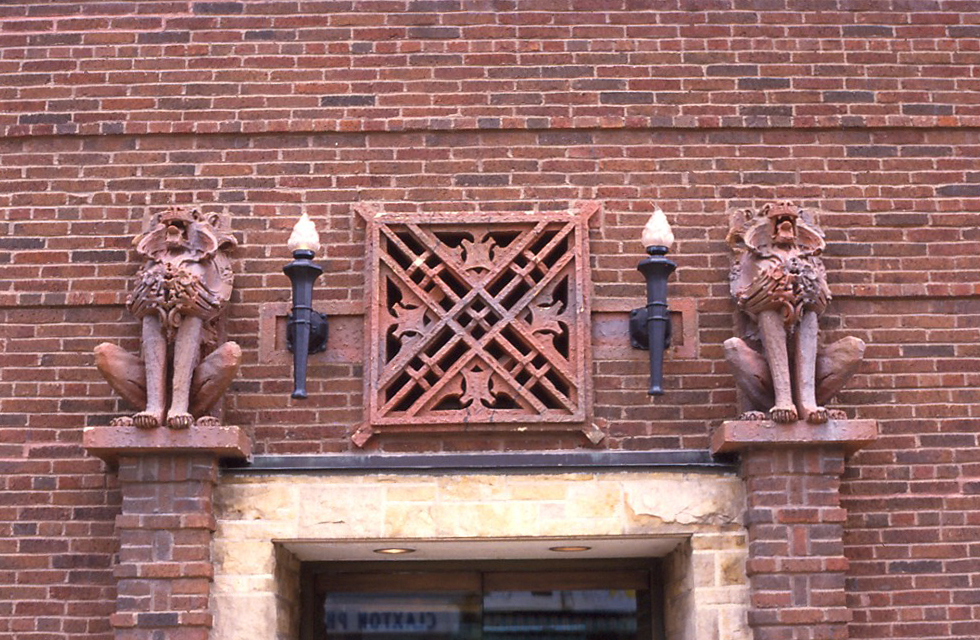
Terra cotta detail

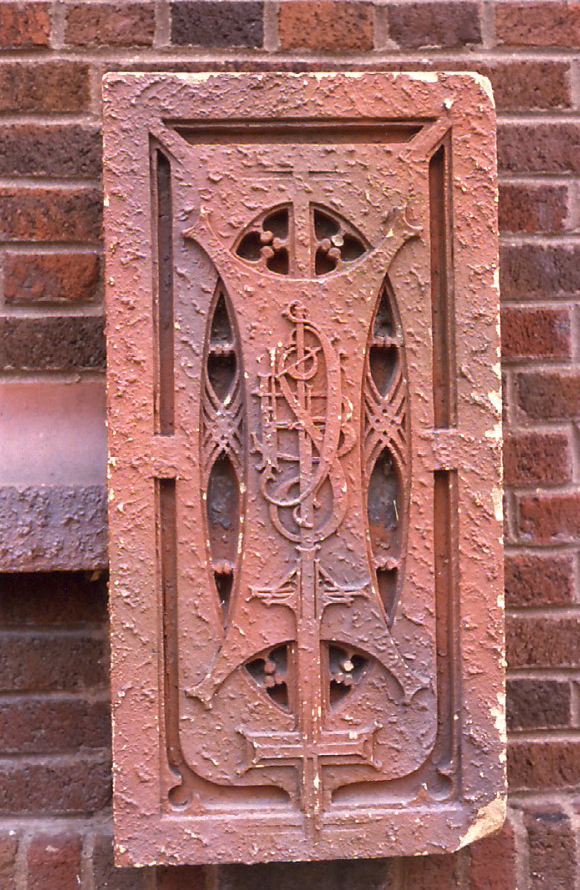
Terra cotta detail

== See also ==
- National Register of Historic Places listings in Linn County, Iowa

Other Louis Sullivan "jewel boxes":

- Farmers and Merchants Bank, Columbus, Wisconsin (1919)
- Henry Adams Building, Algona, Iowa (1913)
- Home Building Association Company, Newark, Ohio (1914)
- Merchants' National Bank, Grinnell, Iowa (1914)
- National Farmer's Bank, Owatonna, Minnesota (1908)
- People's Federal Savings and Loan Association, Sidney, Ohio (1918)
- Purdue State Bank, West Lafayette, Indiana (1914)
