= Home Building Association Bank =

Bank building in Newark, Ohio

- U.S. National Register of Historic Places
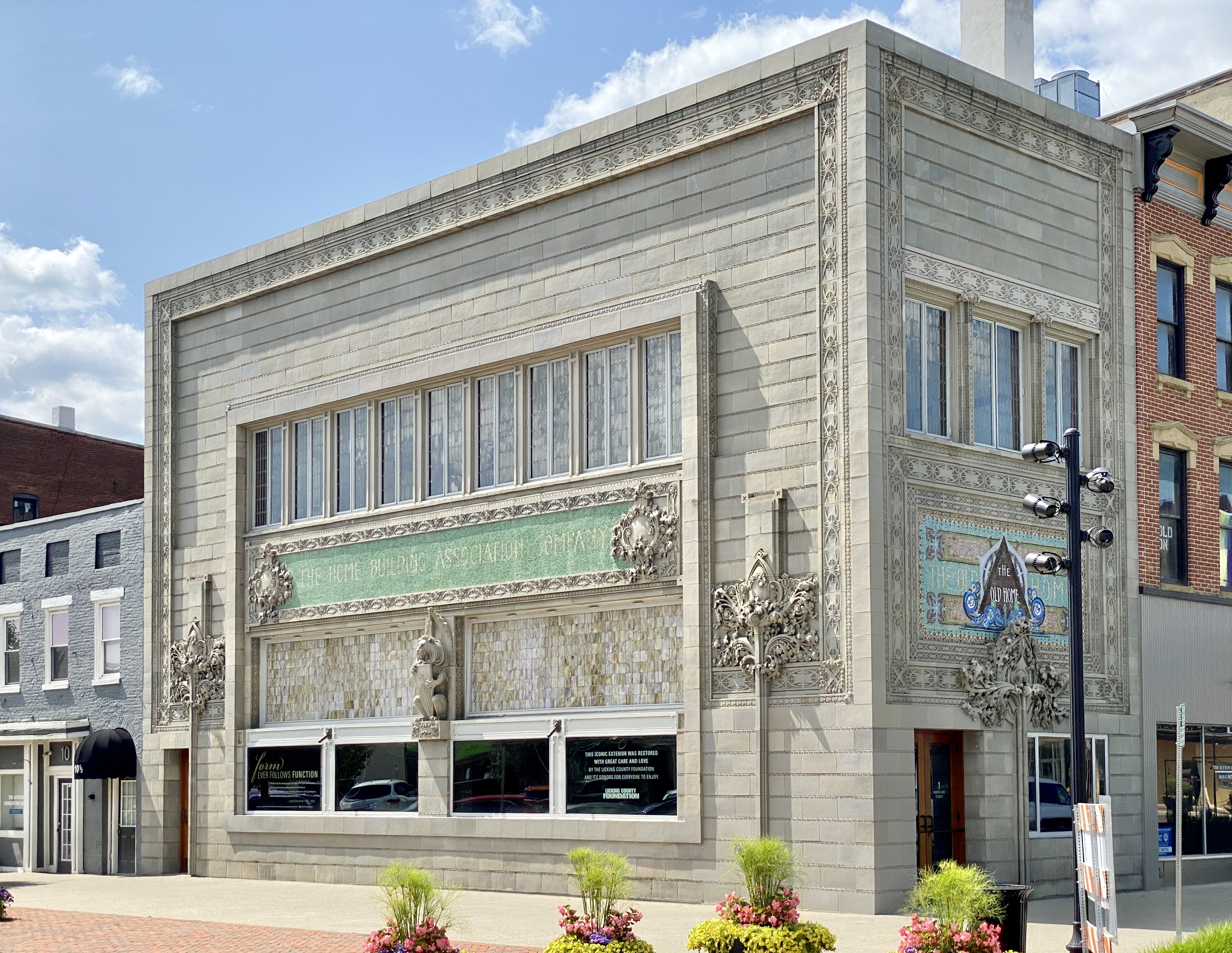
- Interactive map of Home Building Association Bank
- Location: 1 N. Third St., Newark, Ohio
- Coordinates: 40°3′28.3″N 82°24′10.7″W
- Built: 1914
- Architect: Sullivan, Louis
- Architectural style: Late-19th- and early-20th-century American Movements, Sullivanesque
- NRHP reference No.: 73001495
- Added to NRHP: July 2, 1973

The Home Building Association Bank (or Home Building Association Company) is a historic building located at 1 North Third Street in Newark, Ohio, United States. It was one of eight banks designed by noted Chicago architect Louis Sullivan. In 1973, it was added to the National Register of Historic Places.

Of note is the building's rather high number of owners: since its construction, Home Building Association Bank has been home to two financial institutions, a butcher shop, a jewelry store, and an ice cream parlor. Its interior was modified for each occupant.

For this project, Sullivan was given a narrow lot but made the building larger by making it two stories high, something that he did not typically do in his banks. The color scheme chosen here deviates from his normal red-brown brick tapestry surface. Instead the building is covered with gray-green terra cotta slabs that are edged with typical Sullivanesque border designs. The ornamentation included a winged lion quite similar to the ones to be found in Cedar Rapids, Grinnell and Sidney. Little mention is made in the literature about Sullivan as to why these creatures populate his banks. Also unique is the presence of Sullivan's name in the tile mosaic over the front door.

== History ==
The Home Building Association Bank was built in 1914 and opened on August 25, 1915, as The Home Building Association Company, commonly known as "The Old Home". It was one of three banks designed by Sullivan in 1914, the other two being in Grinnell, Iowa, and in West Lafayette, Indiana.

In 1942, the Home Building Association Bank was sold to William Camlin. From 1943 to 1946, Sanitary Meat Market occupied the building, and from 1946 to 1973, Symon's Best Jewelry Company took over.

The building was added to the National Register of Historic Places on July 2, 1973.

From 1979 to 1983, the building was occupied by Mutual Federal Savings and Loan Association. Tiffany's Ice Cream Parlor was the last business in the building, from 1984 to 2007.

The building was donated in December 2013 to the Licking County Foundation, which planned to restore the building. When the renovation was complete, Explore Licking County, the county's convention and visitors bureau, was to move into the space. In 2016, basement rehabilitation began, and was completed that October. Exterior restoration took place from May 2019 to 2021, restoring the building's facades. Interior work, the third stage of the project, involved fundraising in 2023, and is expected to be completed in 2024.

== Images ==
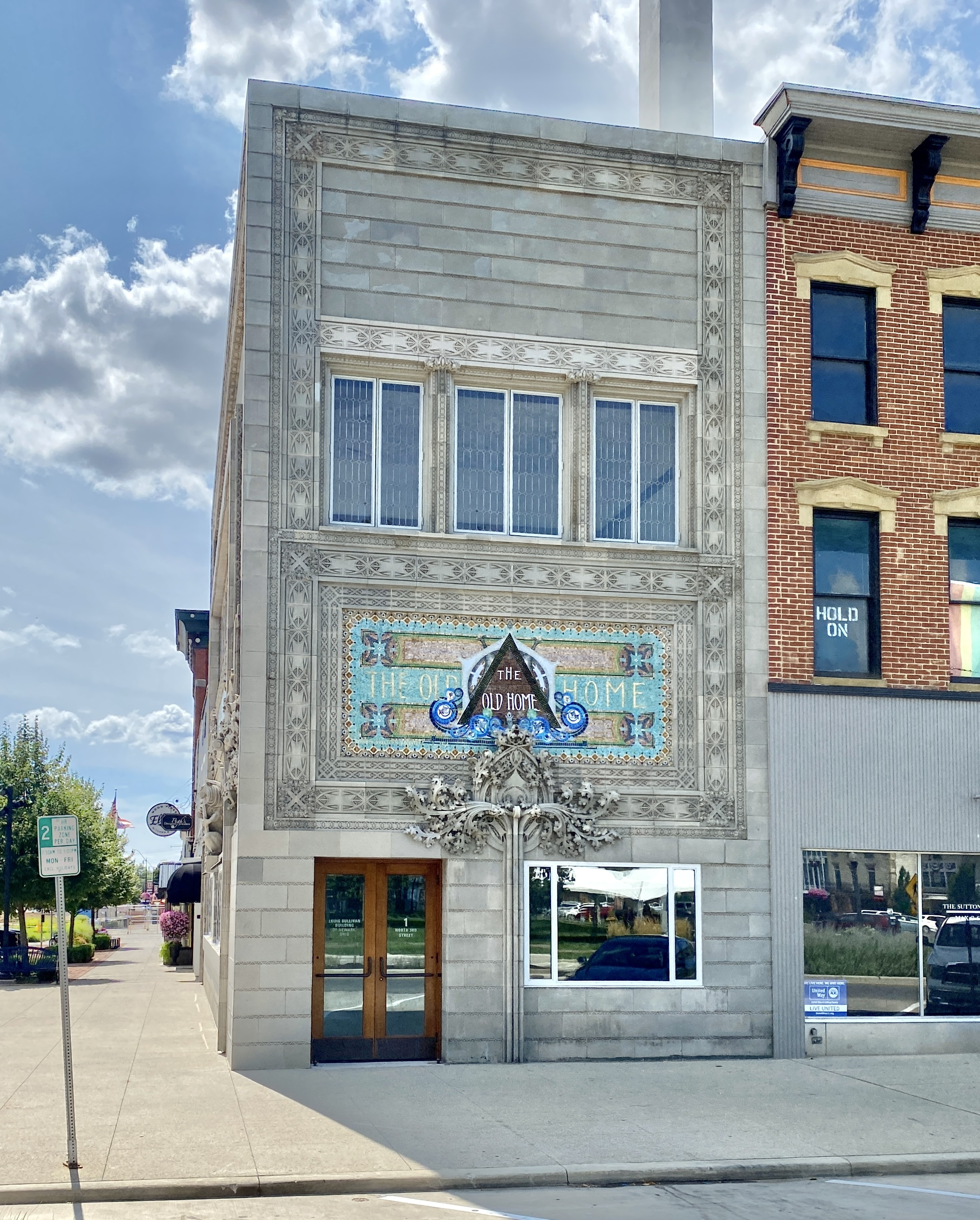
East facade and main entrance

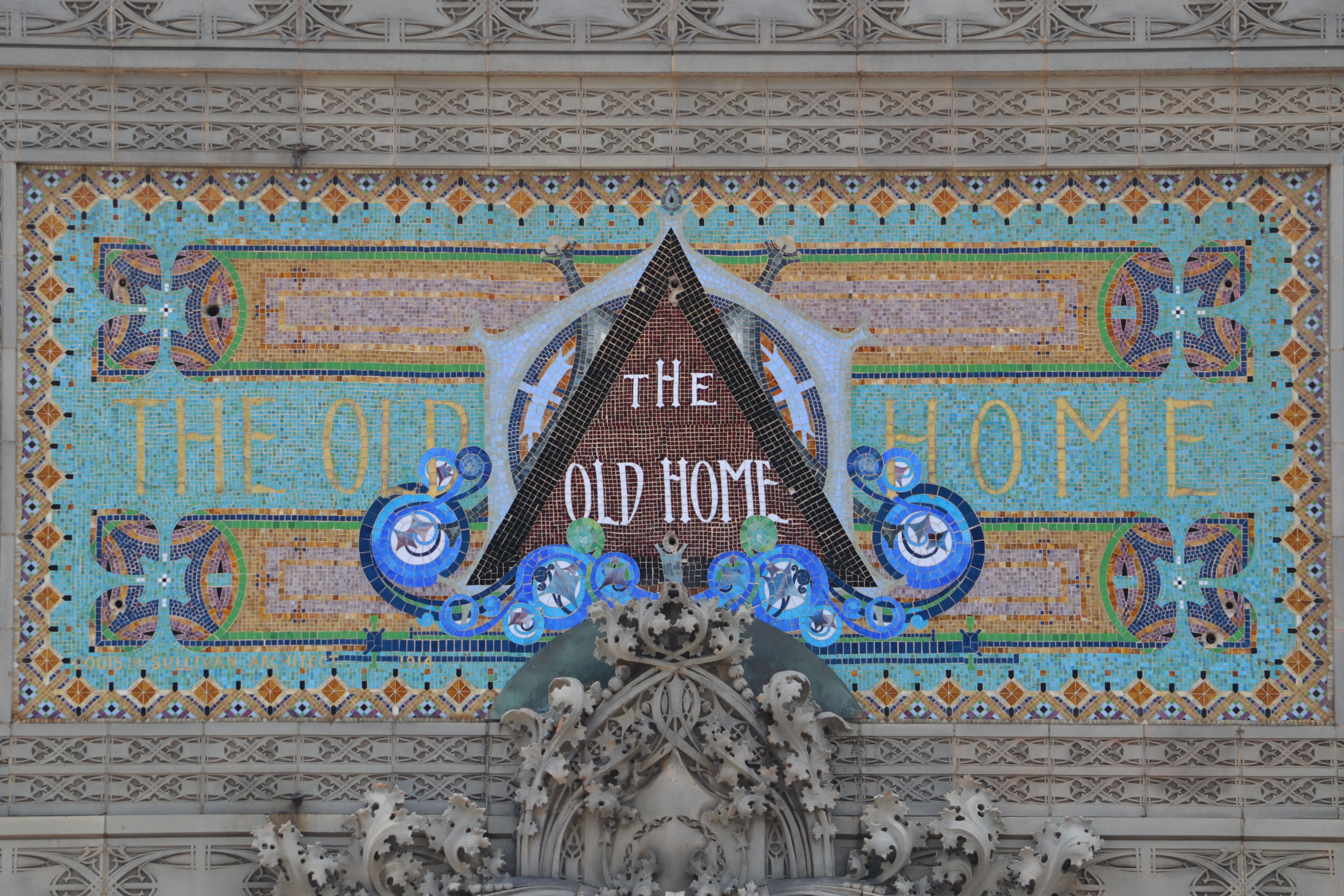
Tile mosaic over main entrance

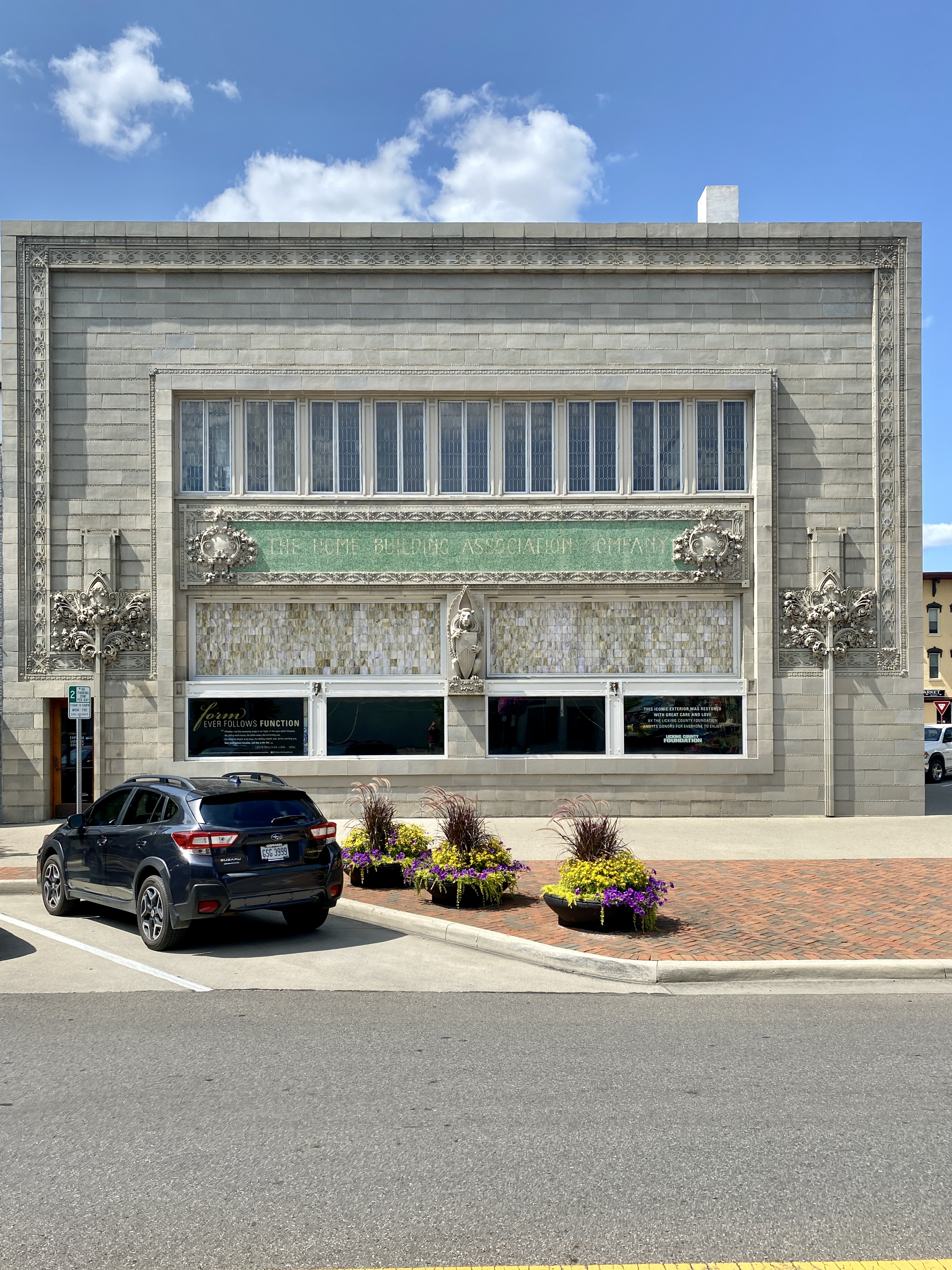
South facade

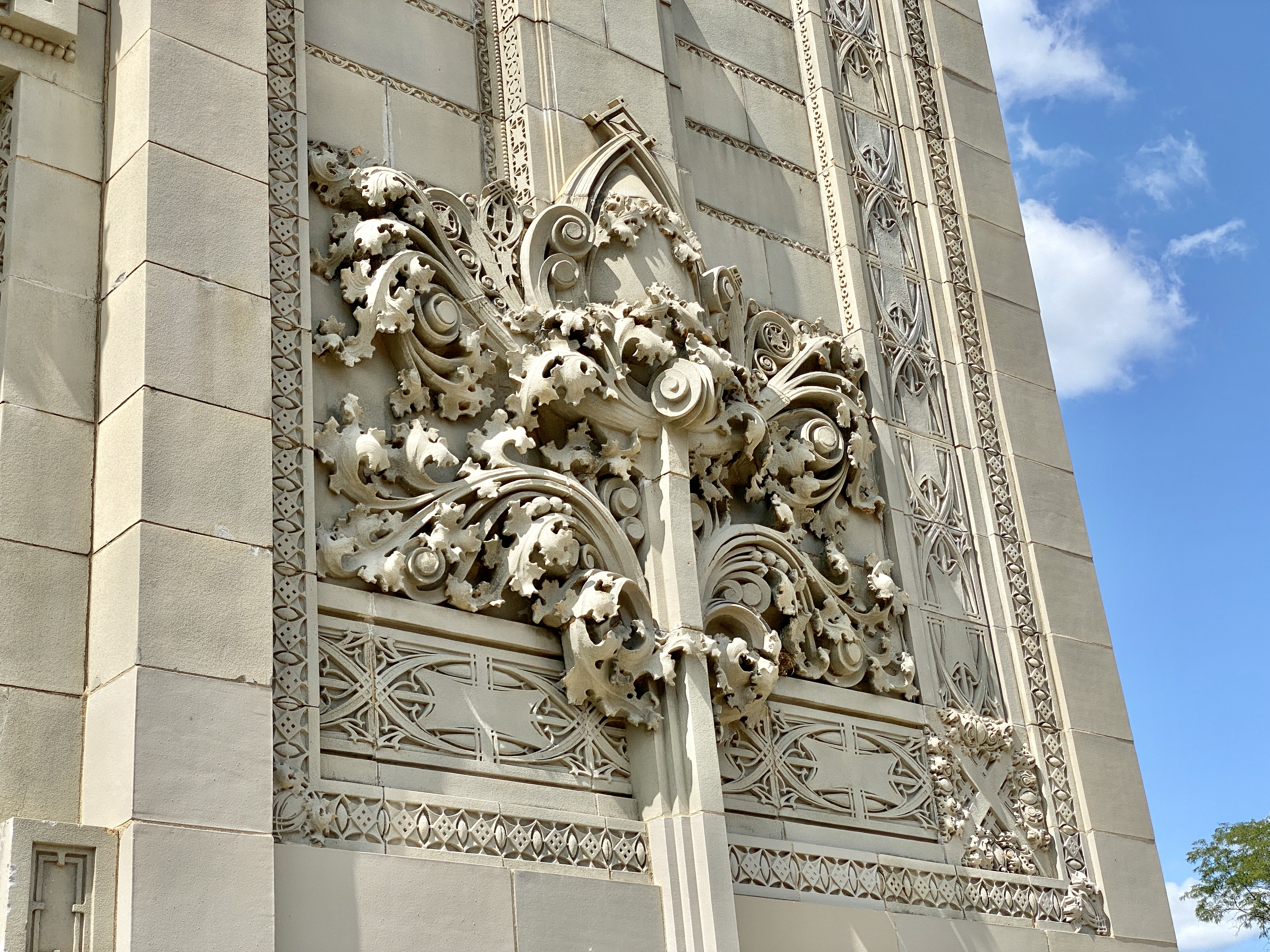
South facade ornamentation

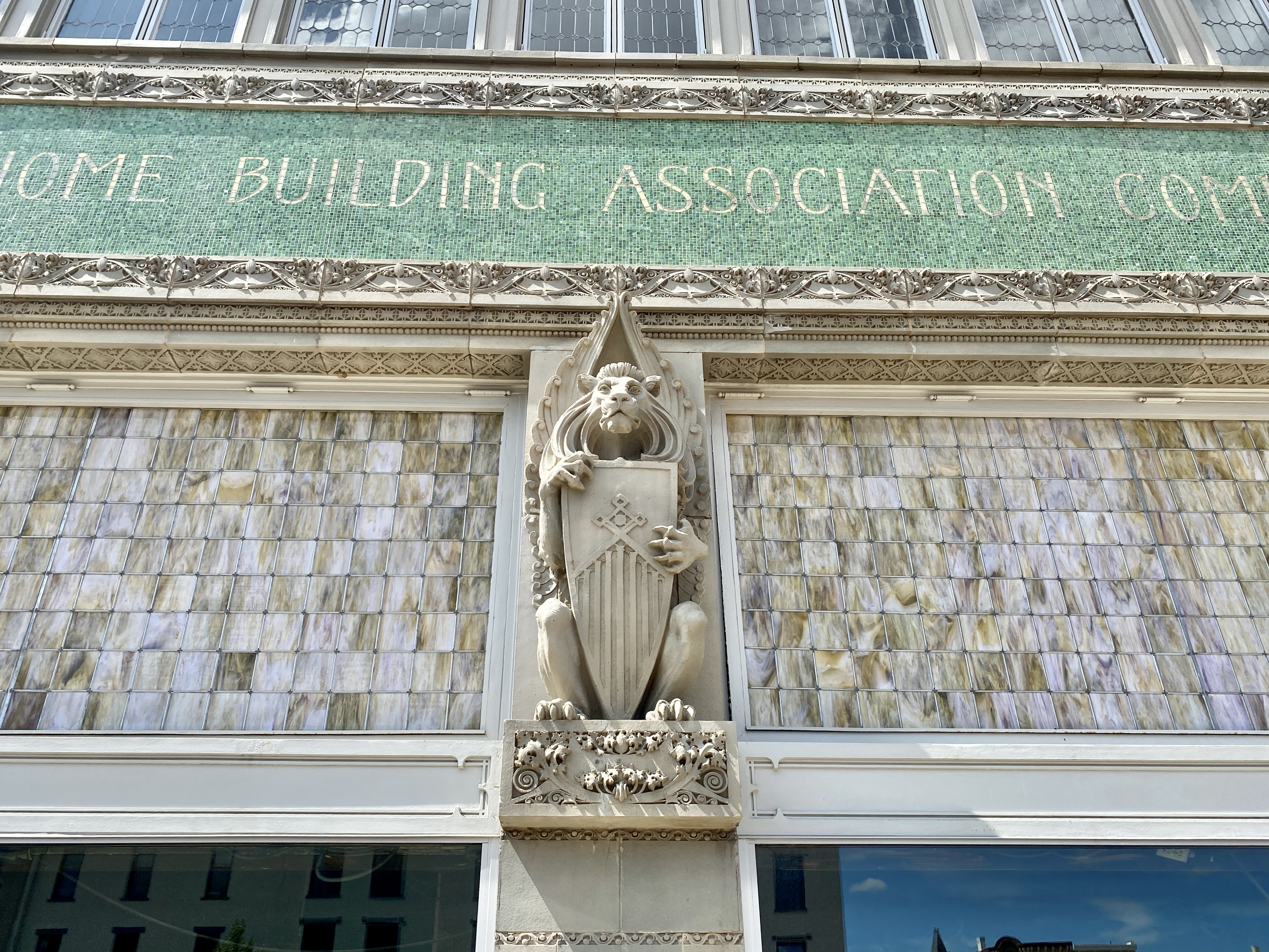
Sculptural work on the south facade

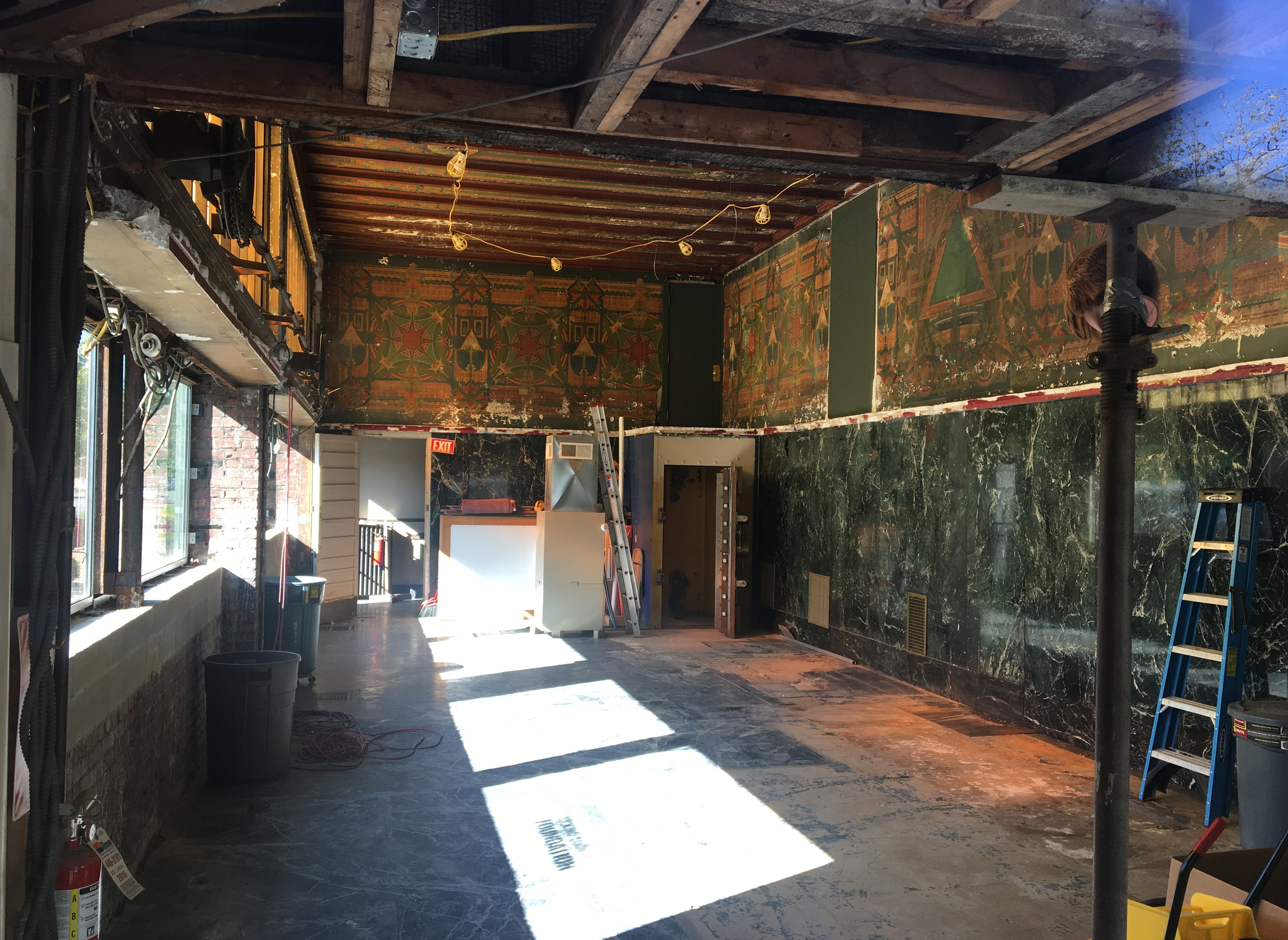
Interior amid renovation, 2020

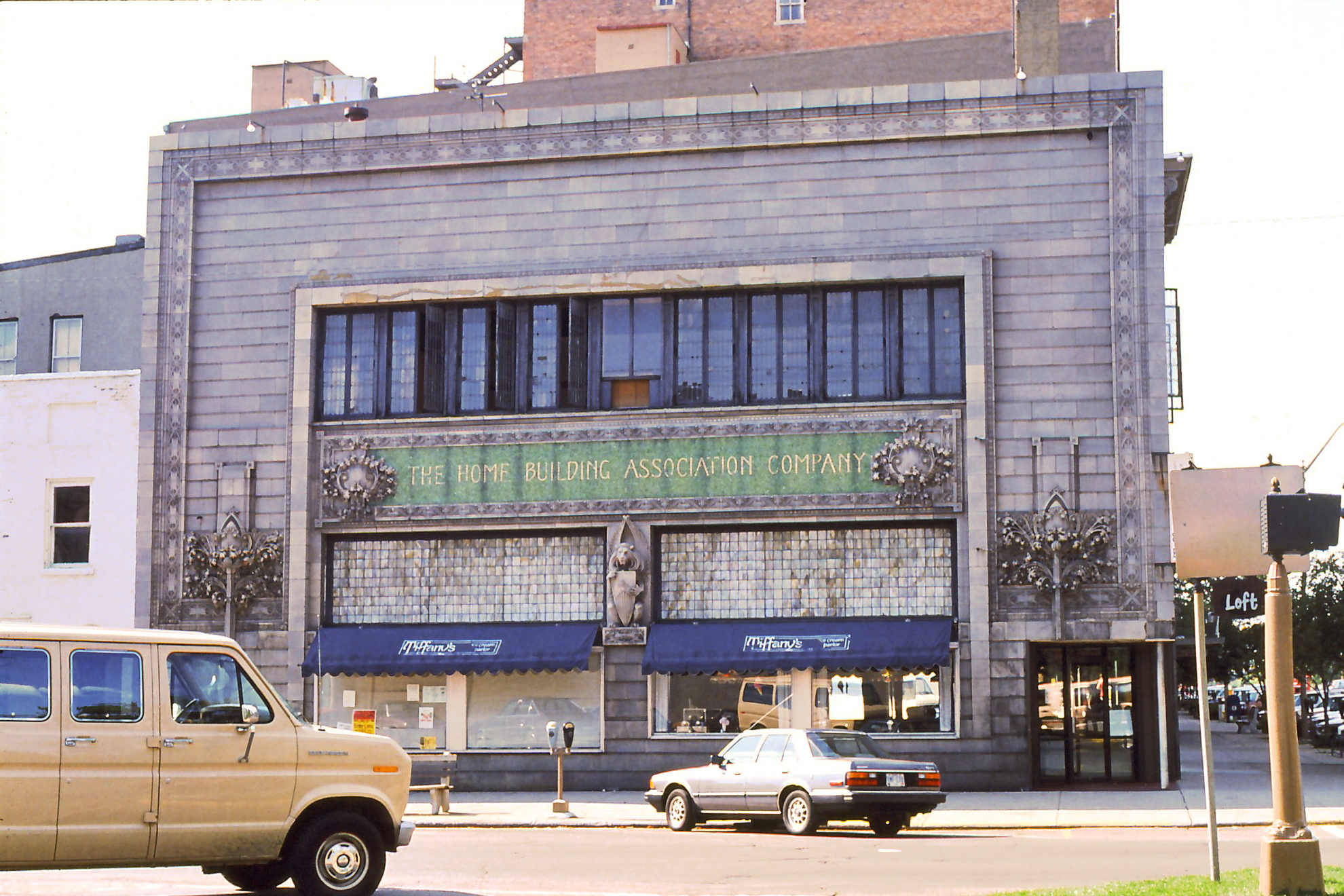
South facade, 1985

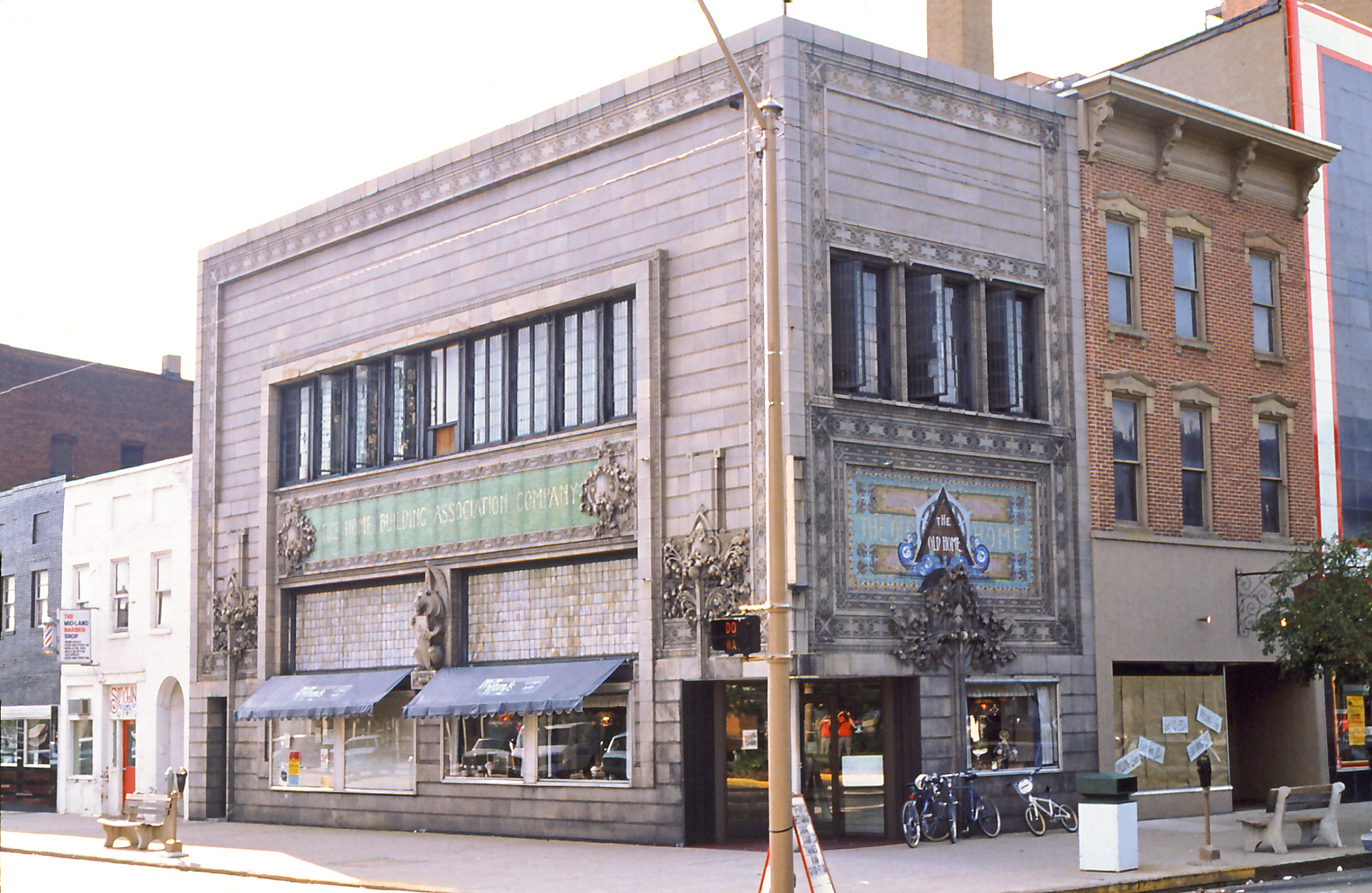
South and east facades, 1985

== See also ==
- National Register of Historic Places listings in Licking County, Ohio

Other Louis Sullivan "jewel boxes":

- National Farmers' Bank, Owatonna, Minnesota (1908)
- Peoples Savings Bank, Cedar Rapids, Iowa (1912)
- Henry Adams Building, Algona, Iowa (1913)
- Merchants' National Bank, Grinnell, Iowa (1914)
- Purdue State Bank, West Lafayette, Indiana (1914)
- People's Federal Savings and Loan Association, Sidney, Ohio (1918)
- Farmers and Merchants Bank, Columbus, Wisconsin (1919)
