= Lu Verne, Iowa =

- City
- Location of Lu Verne, Iowa
- Coordinates: 42°54′34″N 94°05′01″W
- Country: USA
- State: Iowa
- Counties: Kossuth, Humboldt

Area
  - Total: 2.12 sq mi (5.50 km^{2})
  - Land: 2.12 sq mi (5.50 km^{2})
  - Water: 0 sq mi (0.00 km^{2})
- Elevation: 1,165 ft (355 m)

Population (2020)
  - Total: 258
  - Density: 121.5/sq mi (46.91/km^{2})
- Time zone: UTC-6 (Central (CST))
  - Summer (DST): UTC-5 (CDT)
- ZIP code: 50560
- Area code: 515
- FIPS code: 19-47370
- GNIS feature ID: 2395780

Lu Verne is a city in Humboldt and Kossuth counties in the U.S. state of Iowa. The population was 258 at the time of the 2020 census.

== History ==
Lu Verne was platted in 1880. It was named after Luverne, Minnesota.

Lu Verne was formerly serviced by Iowa Highway 408, which was decommissioned in 1980.

== Geography ==
According to the United States Census Bureau, the city has a total area of 2.26 square miles (5.85 km^{2}), all land.

== Demographics ==
Historical populations
Year	Pop.	±%
1900	534	—
1910	501	−6.2%
1920	610	+21.8%
1930	570	−6.6%
1940	576	+1.1%
1950	553	−4.0%
1960	468	−15.4%
1970	380	−18.8%
1980	418	+10.0%
1990	328	−21.5%
2000	299	−8.8%
2010	261	−12.7%
2020	258	−1.1%
Source:"U.S. Census website". United States Census Bureau. and Iowa Data Center; Source: U.S. Decennial Census

=== 2020 census ===
As of the census of 2020, there were 258 people, 101 households, and 63 families residing in the city. The population density was 121.5 inhabitants per square mile (46.9/km^{2}). There were 132 housing units at an average density of 62.2 per square mile (24.0/km^{2}). The racial makeup of the city was 91.1% White, 0.8% Black or African American, 0.0% Native American, 0.4% Asian, 0.0% Pacific Islander, 1.2% from other races and 6.6% from two or more races. Hispanic or Latino persons of any race comprised 3.1% of the population.

Of the 101 households, 36.6% of which had children under the age of 18 living with them, 46.5% were married couples living together, 4.0% were cohabitating couples, 28.7% had a female householder with no spouse or partner present and 20.8% had a male householder with no spouse or partner present. 37.6% of all households were non-families. 32.7% of all households were made up of individuals, 12.9% had someone living alone who was 65 years old or older.

The median age in the city was 33.7 years. 28.7% of the residents were under the age of 20; 5.0% were between the ages of 20 and 24; 26.7% were from 25 and 44; 25.6% were from 45 and 64; and 14.0% were 65 years of age or older. The gender makeup of the city was 50.8% male and 49.2% female.

=== 2010 census ===
As of the census of 2010, there were 261 people, 117 households, and 72 families living in the city. The population density was 115.5 inhabitants per square mile (44.6/km^{2}). There were 152 housing units at an average density of 67.3 per square mile (26.0/km^{2}). The racial makeup of the city was 96.9% White, 1.5% Native American, 0.4% from other races, and 1.1% from two or more races. Hispanic or Latino of any race were 3.8% of the population.

There were 117 households, of which 28.2% had children under the age of 18 living with them, 42.7% were married couples living together, 11.1% had a female householder with no husband present, 7.7% had a male householder with no wife present, and 38.5% were non-families. 35.0% of all households were made up of individuals, and 19.6% had someone living alone who was 65 years of age or older. The average household size was 2.23 and the average family size was 2.76.

The median age in the city was 42.1 years. 23.4% of residents were under the age of 18; 5.7% were between the ages of 18 and 24; 23.4% were from 25 to 44; 27.5% were from 45 to 64; and 19.9% were 65 years of age or older. The gender makeup of the city was 47.9% male and 52.1% female.

=== 2000 census ===
As of the census of 2000, there were 299 people, 131 households, and 85 families living in the city. The population density was 132.3 inhabitants per square mile (51.1/km^{2}). There were 163 housing units at an average density of 72.1 per square mile (27.8/km^{2}). The racial makeup of the city was 99.33% White, 0.33% Native American, and 0.33% from two or more races. Hispanic or Latino of any race were 0.33% of the population.

There were 131 households, out of which 28.2% had children under the age of 18 living with them, 50.4% were married couples living together, 9.9% had a female householder with no husband present, and 35.1% were non-families. 28.2% of all households were made up of individuals, and 14.5% had someone living alone who was 65 years of age or older. The average household size was 2.28 and the average family size was 2.78.

In the city, the population was spread out, with 22.7% under the age of 18, 9.4% from 18 to 24, 26.4% from 25 to 44, 22.1% from 45 to 64, and 19.4% who were 65 years of age or older. The median age was 38 years. For every 100 females, there were 104.8 males. For every 100 females age 18 and over, there were 102.6 males.

The median income for a household in the city was $30,625, and the median income for a family was $34,500. Males had a median income of $21,429 versus $20,000 for females. The per capita income for the city was $16,281. About 14.5% of families and 13.8% of the population were below the poverty line, including 23.0% of those under the age of eighteen and 6.3% of those 65 or over.

== Education ==
The local school district is Algona Community School District.

Lu Verne Community School District was the area school district. Since 2015, Lu Verne sends its secondary students to the Algona Community School District, which operates Algona Middle School and Algona High School. Lu Verne merged into Algona CSD in 2023.

From 1984 until 2015, the Lu Verne district grade-shared with Corwith–Wesley Community School District, which operated Corwith–Wesley–Lu Verne High School.
