= Corwith–Wesley–Lu Verne High School =

High school in Corwith, Iowa, US

- Corwith, Iowa; United States

Information
- Closed: 2015
- School district: Corwith–Wesley Community School District in association with Lu Verne Community School District

Corwith–Wesley–Lu Verne High School was a senior high school in Corwith, Iowa, It was operated by the Corwith–Wesley Community School District in association with the Lu Verne Community School District.

The Corwith–Wesley district served the towns of Corwith and Wesley, while the Lu Verne district served the town of Lu Verne.

== History ==
In 1984, Corwith–Wesley established a grade-sharing arrangement, in which it operated Corwith–Wesley–Lu Verne High, with the Lu Verne Community district sending its secondary students there. This continued for the remainder of the Corwith–Wesley district's existence.

The school closed when the Corwith–Wesley district was dissolved in 2015. In 2013 students zoned to Corwith–Wesley–Lu Verne High indicated a preference of attending Algona Middle School and Algona High School over the secondary schools in the West Hancock Community School District. The Des Moines Register gave extensive coverage to the school closure, with at least twelve articles being written in that publication about the closure in the period from circa October 2014 to October 2015. Jason Clayworth and Rodney White, journalists from the paper, stated that "The coverage generated a statewide conversation and action". The building had an anticipated demolition in 2016.
