= Titonka, Iowa =

- City
- Nickname: "Big Black"
- Motto: "Proud Of Our Heritage, Committed To Our Future"
- Location of Titonka, Iowa
- Coordinates: 43°14′14″N 94°02′29″W
- Country: USA
- State: Iowa
- County: Kossuth

Area
  - Total: 0.28 sq mi (0.73 km^{2})
  - Land: 0.28 sq mi (0.73 km^{2})
  - Water: 0 sq mi (0.00 km^{2})
- Elevation: 1,161 ft (354 m)

Population (2020)
  - Total: 511
  - Density: 1,811.6/sq mi (699.48/km^{2})
- Time zone: UTC-6 (Central (CST))
  - Summer (DST): UTC-5 (CDT)
- ZIP code: 50480
- Area code: 515
- FIPS code: 19-78330
- GNIS feature ID: 2397032
- Website: City of Titonka, Iowa Website

Titonka is a city in Kossuth County, Iowa, United States. The population was 511 at the time of the 2020 census.

== History ==
Titonka got its start in the year 1898, following construction of the Burlington, Cedar Rapids and Northern Railway through that territory. Titonka is a Sioux name meaning "big black (buffalo)".

Titonka was incorporated on February 1, 1898.

== Geography ==
According to the United States Census Bureau, the city has a total area of 0.28 square miles (0.73 km^{2}), all land.

== Demographics ==
Historical populations
| Year | Pop. | ±% |
|---|---|---|
| 1900 | 224 | — |
| 1910 | 278 | +24.1% |
| 1920 | 418 | +50.4% |
| 1930 | 473 | +13.2% |
| 1940 | 574 | +21.4% |
| 1950 | 589 | +2.6% |
| 1960 | 647 | +9.8% |
| 1970 | 599 | −7.4% |
| 1980 | 658 | +9.8% |
| 1990 | 612 | −7.0% |
| 2000 | 584 | −4.6% |
| 2010 | 476 | −18.5% |
| 2020 | 511 | +7.4% |
Source:"U.S. Census website". United States Census Bureau. and Iowa Data Center; Source: U.S. Decennial Census

=== 2020 census ===
As of the census of 2020, there were 511 people, 211 households, and 124 families residing in the city. The population density was 1,809.6 inhabitants per square mile (698.7/km^{2}). There were 258 housing units at an average density of 913.7 per square mile (352.8/km^{2}). The racial makeup of the city was 95.9% White, 0.2% Black or African American, 0.4% Native American, 0.2% Asian, 0.0% Pacific Islander, 1.0% from other races and 2.3% from two or more races. Hispanic or Latino persons of any race comprised 2.3% of the population.

Of the 211 households, 28.4% of which had children under the age of 18 living with them, 47.9% were married couples living together, 8.5% were cohabitating couples, 25.1% had a female householder with no spouse or partner present and 18.5% had a male householder with no spouse or partner present. 41.2% of all households were non-families. 34.6% of all households were made up of individuals, 19.4% had someone living alone who was 65 years old or older.

The median age in the city was 41.4 years. 26.2% of the residents were under the age of 20; 6.3% were between the ages of 20 and 24; 21.9% were from 25 and 44; 20.7% were from 45 and 64; and 24.9% were 65 years of age or older. The gender makeup of the city was 51.7% male and 48.3% female.

=== 2010 census ===
As of the census of 2010, there were 476 people, 223 households, and 114 families living in the city. The population density was 1,700.0 inhabitants per square mile (656.4/km^{2}). There were 264 housing units at an average density of 942.9 per square mile (364.1/km^{2}). The racial makeup of the city was 98.7% White, 0.2% Native American, 0.4% Pacific Islander, and 0.6% from two or more races. Hispanic or Latino of any race were 1.5% of the population.

There were 223 households, of which 20.6% had children under the age of 18 living with them, 43.0% were married couples living together, 7.2% had a female householder with no husband present, 0.9% had a male householder with no wife present, and 48.9% were non-families. 47.5% of all households were made up of individuals, and 26% had someone living alone who was 65 years of age or older. The average household size was 1.99 and the average family size was 2.85.

The median age in the city was 52.4 years. 20.4% of residents were under the age of 18; 4.8% were between the ages of 18 and 24; 16% were from 25 to 44; 24.7% were from 45 to 64; and 34% were 65 years of age or older. The gender makeup of the city was 46.0% male and 54.0% female.

=== 2000 census ===
As of the census of 2000, there were 584 people, 250 households, and 148 families living in the city. The population density was 2,092.2 inhabitants per square mile (807.8/km^{2}). There were 279 housing units at an average density of 999.5 per square mile (385.9/km^{2}). The racial makeup of the city was 99.32% White, 0.17% Asian, and 0.51% from two or more races. Hispanic or Latino of any race were 0.51% of the population.

There were 250 households, out of which 24.4% had children under the age of 18 living with them, 52.4% were married couples living together, 5.6% had a female householder with no husband present, and 40.4% were non-families. 38.4% of all households were made up of individuals, and 25.2% had someone living alone who was 65 years of age or older. The average household size was 2.21 and the average family size was 2.94.

In the city the population was spread out, with 21.4% under the age of 18, 6.3% from 18 to 24, 20.9% from 25 to 44, 16.8% from 45 to 64, and 34.6% who were 65 years of age or older. The median age was 46 years. For every 100 females, there were 81.9 males. For every 100 females age 18 and over, there were 75.2 males.

The median income for a household in the city was $35,147, and the median income for a family was $44,125. Males had a median income of $26,500 versus $19,750 for females. The per capita income for the city was $16,594. About 3.9% of families and 5.8% of the population were below the poverty line, including 9.9% of those under age 18 and 6.1% of those age 65 or over.

== Education ==
The community is served by the Algona Community School District. It operates Algona High School.

It was a part of the Titonka Consolidated School District until July 1, 2014, when it consolidated into the Algona district. The Algona district, which took control of the Titonka school building, was scheduled to sell it to the Titonka city government on January 12, 2015.
