= Henry Adams Building =

Bank building in Algona, Iowa

- Land and Loan Office Building
- U.S. National Register of Historic Places
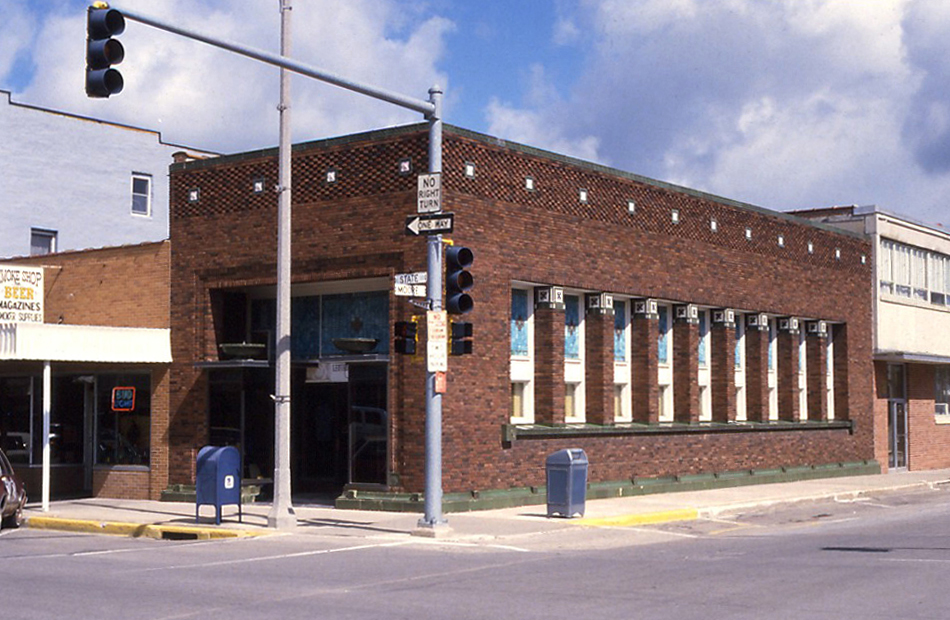
- Street view of the building

- Location within Iowa Location within the United States
- Location: 123 E. State St. Algona, Iowa
- Coordinates: 43°4′8″N 94°14′8″W
- Area: less than one acre
- Built: 1913
- Architect: Louis H. Sullivan
- Architectural style: Late 19th And Early 20th Century American Movements
- NRHP reference No.: 98000250
- Added to NRHP: March 19, 1998

The Henry Adams Building, also known as the Land and Loan Office Building, is a historic building in Algona, Iowa, United States. It was designed by Louis Sullivan in 1912.

Although it was not designed as a bank, and has never served as such, the building is nonetheless considered one of Sullivan's "Jewel Boxes," a series of banks designed and built in the Midwest between 1909 and 1919. As in the other "Jewel Boxes," Sullivan included many windows, both on the street side and in the skylight that allowed a great deal of natural light inside. The simple massing of this small, rectangular building with its clearly defined structure was typical of Sullivan's later work. The same massing and similar detailing, particularly the entrance, was used by Sullivan's former associates Purcell & Elmslie in their slightly larger Exchange State Bank in Grand Meadow, Minnesota in 1910, and it is possible that this design influenced Sullivan. (Brooks) Sullivan was assisted in the design by his draftsman, Parker Berry, who drew the perspectives.

The building was added to the National Register of Historic Places in 1998, under the name of "Land and Loan Office Building." It is currently occupied by the Algona Chamber of Commerce.

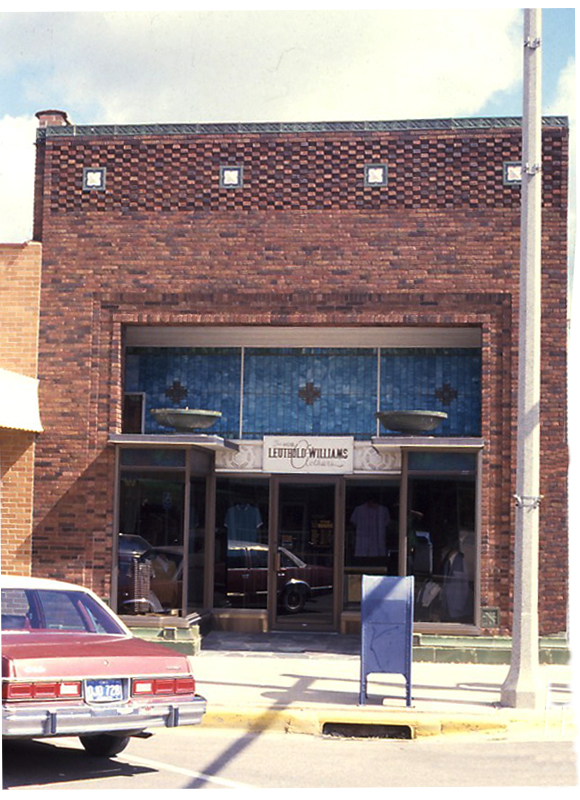

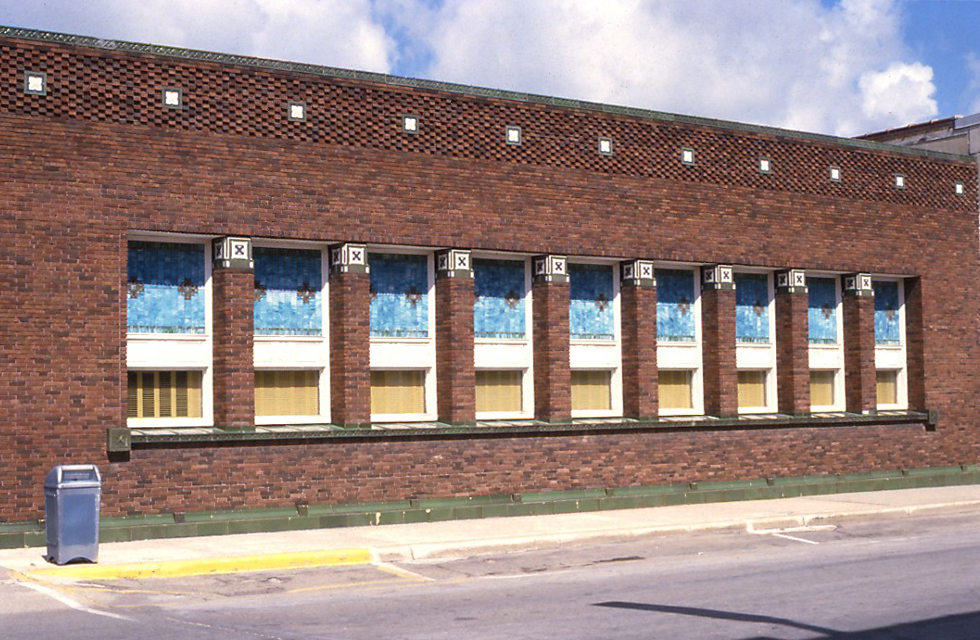

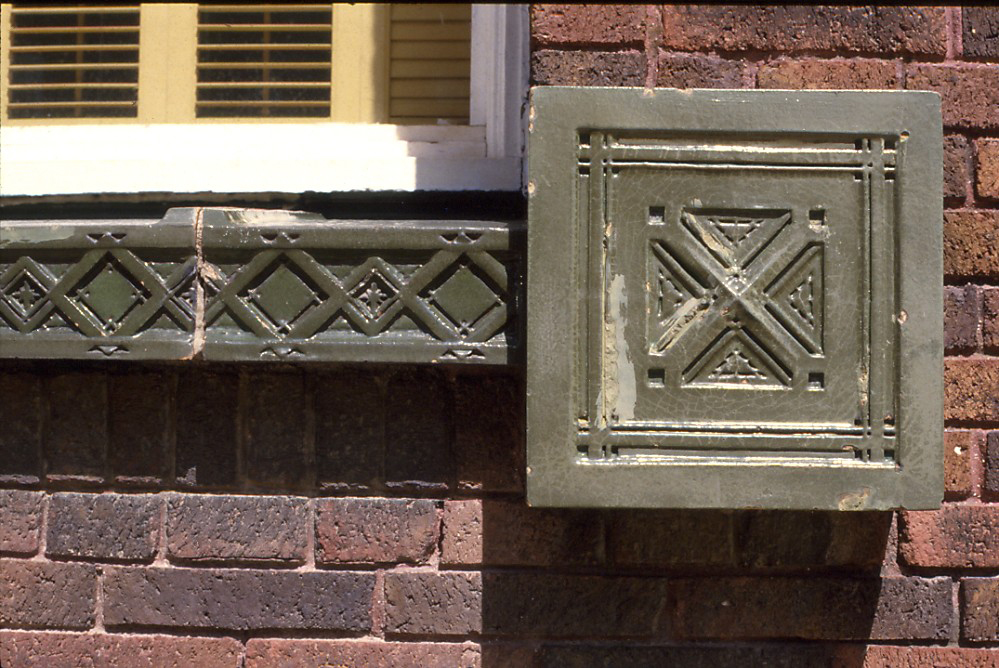

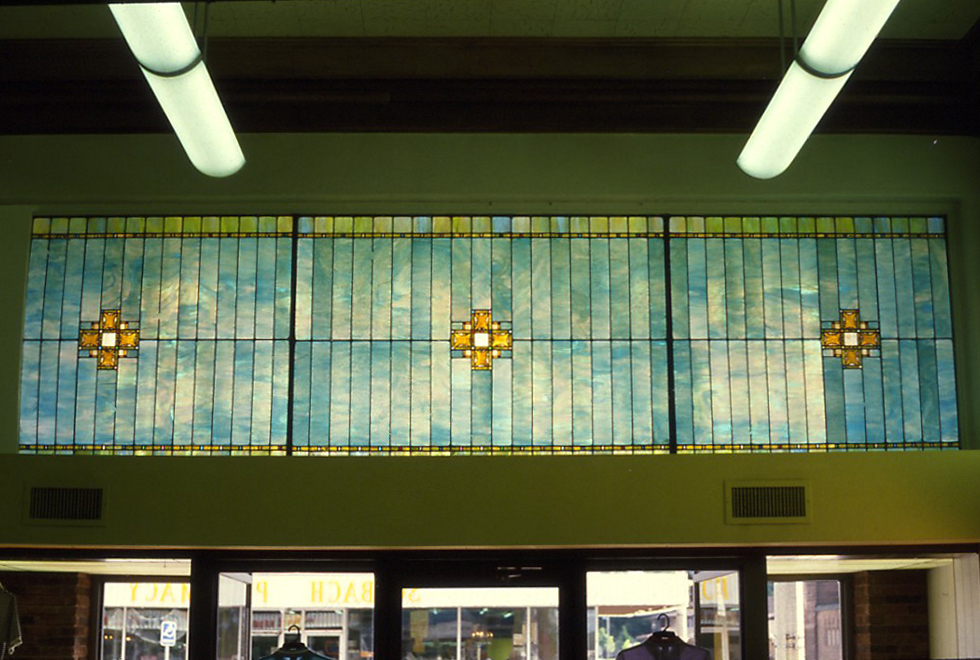

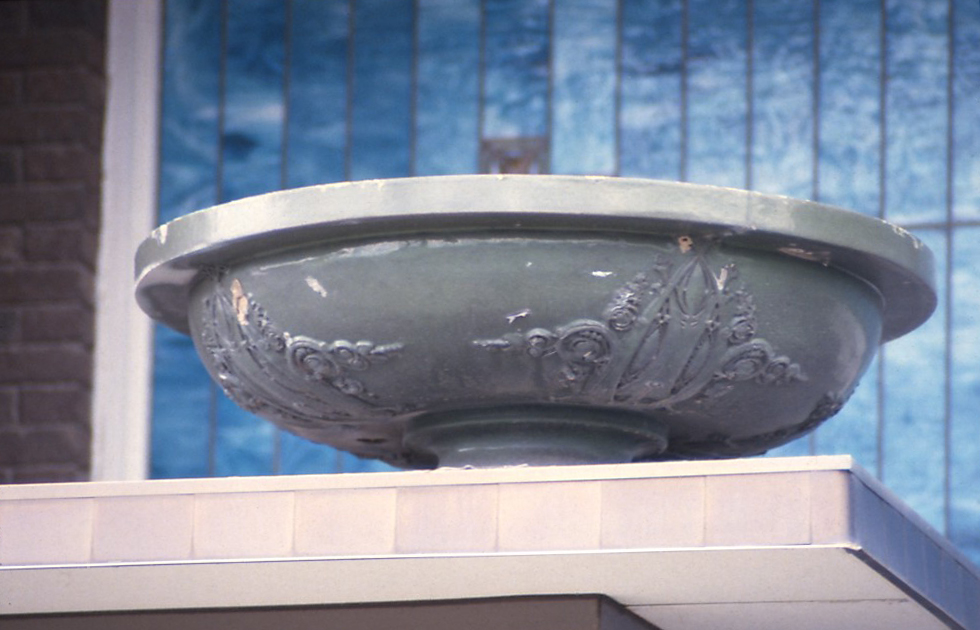

== See also ==
- National Register of Historic Places listings in Kossuth County, Iowa

Other Louis Sullivan "jewel boxes":

- Farmers and Merchants Bank, Columbus, Wisconsin (1919)
- Home Building Association Company, Newark, Ohio (1914)
- Merchants' National Bank, Grinnell, Iowa (1914)
- National Farmer's Bank, Owatonna, Minnesota (1908)
- People's Federal Savings and Loan Association, Sidney, Ohio (1918)
- Peoples Savings Bank, Cedar Rapids, Iowa (1912)
- Purdue State Bank, West Lafayette, Indiana (1914)
