= Lu Verne Community School District =

School district in Iowa, United States

Coordinates: 42.912349°N 94.085642°W

Location
- Lu Verne, Iowa Kossuth, Hancock, and Humboldt counties United States
- Coordinates: 42.912349, -94.085642

District information
- Type: Local school district
- Grades: K-6
- Superintendent: Jon Hueser
- Schools: 1
- Budget: $2,744,000 (2020-21)
- NCES District ID: 1917880

Students and staff
- Students: 35 (2022-23)
- Teachers: 6.18 FTE
- Staff: 8.52 FTE
- Student–teacher ratio: 5.66
- District mascot: Panthers

Other information
- Website: www.luverne.k12.ia.us

Lu Verne Community School District was a rural public school district headquartered in Lu Verne, Iowa.

The district, which occupied sections of Kossuth, Hancock, and Humboldt counties, served Lu Verne, Corwith, and Wesley. On July 1, 2023, the district merged into the Algona CSD.

== History ==
In 1984, the Corwith–Wesley Community School District established a grade-sharing arrangement, in which it operated Corwith–Wesley–Lu Verne High School, with the Lu Verne district sending its secondary students there.

On July 1, 1988, the Boone Valley Community School District dissolved, with a portion transferred to the Lu Verne district.

By 2013, there were 86 students of all grade levels in the Lu Verne district and 115 students of all grade levels within the Corwith–Wesley district; districts cannot merge under Iowa law if they have fewer than 200 students total, and lower enrollments means getting less funds from the Iowa state government. At the time the two districts were trying to find a third school district for a new grade-sharing arrangement. In April 2013 all of the board members of Lu Verne voted to have such an agreement with the Algona Community School District.

On July 1, 2015, the Corwith–Wesley district dissolved, with a portion of the district being reassigned to the Lu Verne district. Lu Verne received 87% of the former Corwith–Wesley territory, and most of Corwith–Wesley's elementary students were scheduled to go to Lu Verne schools. Starting in 2015, the Lu Verne district began to send its secondary students to Algona Community School District schools - Algona Middle School and Algona High School - as part of a new grade-sharing arrangement.

In September 2022, voters in Lu Verne CSD approved being taken over by Algona CSD, with 121 in favor and 45 against; additionally, voters in Algona CSD voted to take in Lu Verne CSD with 349 in favor and 9 against.

On July 1, 2023, the district merged into the Algona CSD.

== Schools ==
Former schools:

- LuVerne Elementary School
- CWL Middle School (meaning Corwith–Wesley-LuVerne)

== Enrollment ==
View source data.
