= Burt, Iowa =

- City
- Location of Burt, Iowa
- Coordinates: 43°11′57″N 94°13′17″W
- Country: USA
- State: Iowa
- County: Kossuth

Area
  - Total: 0.42 sq mi (1.10 km^{2})
  - Land: 0.42 sq mi (1.10 km^{2})
  - Water: 0 sq mi (0.00 km^{2})
- Elevation: 1,178 ft (359 m)

Population (2020)
  - Total: 418
  - Density: 983.0/sq mi (379.52/km^{2})
- Time zone: UTC-6 (Central (CST))
  - Summer (DST): UTC-5 (CDT)
- ZIP code: 50522
- Area code: 515
- FIPS code: 19-09685
- GNIS feature ID: 2393475
- Website: www.burtiowa.com

Burt is a city in Kossuth County, Iowa, United States. The population was 418 at the 2020 census.

== History ==
Burt was platted in 1881 when the railroad was extended to that point. It was named for Horace G. Burt, a railroad official.

== Geography ==
According to the United States Census Bureau, the city has a total area of 0.44 square miles (1.14 km^{2}), all land.

== Demographics ==
Historical populations
Year	Pop.	±%
1900	504	—
1910	495	−1.8%
1920	626	+26.5%
1930	580	−7.3%
1940	613	+5.7%
1950	572	−6.7%
1960	620	+8.4%
1970	608	−1.9%
1980	689	+13.3%
1990	575	−16.5%
2000	556	−3.3%
2010	533	−4.1%
2020	418	−21.6%
Source:"U.S. Census website". United States Census Bureau. and Iowa Data Center; Source: U.S. Decennial Census

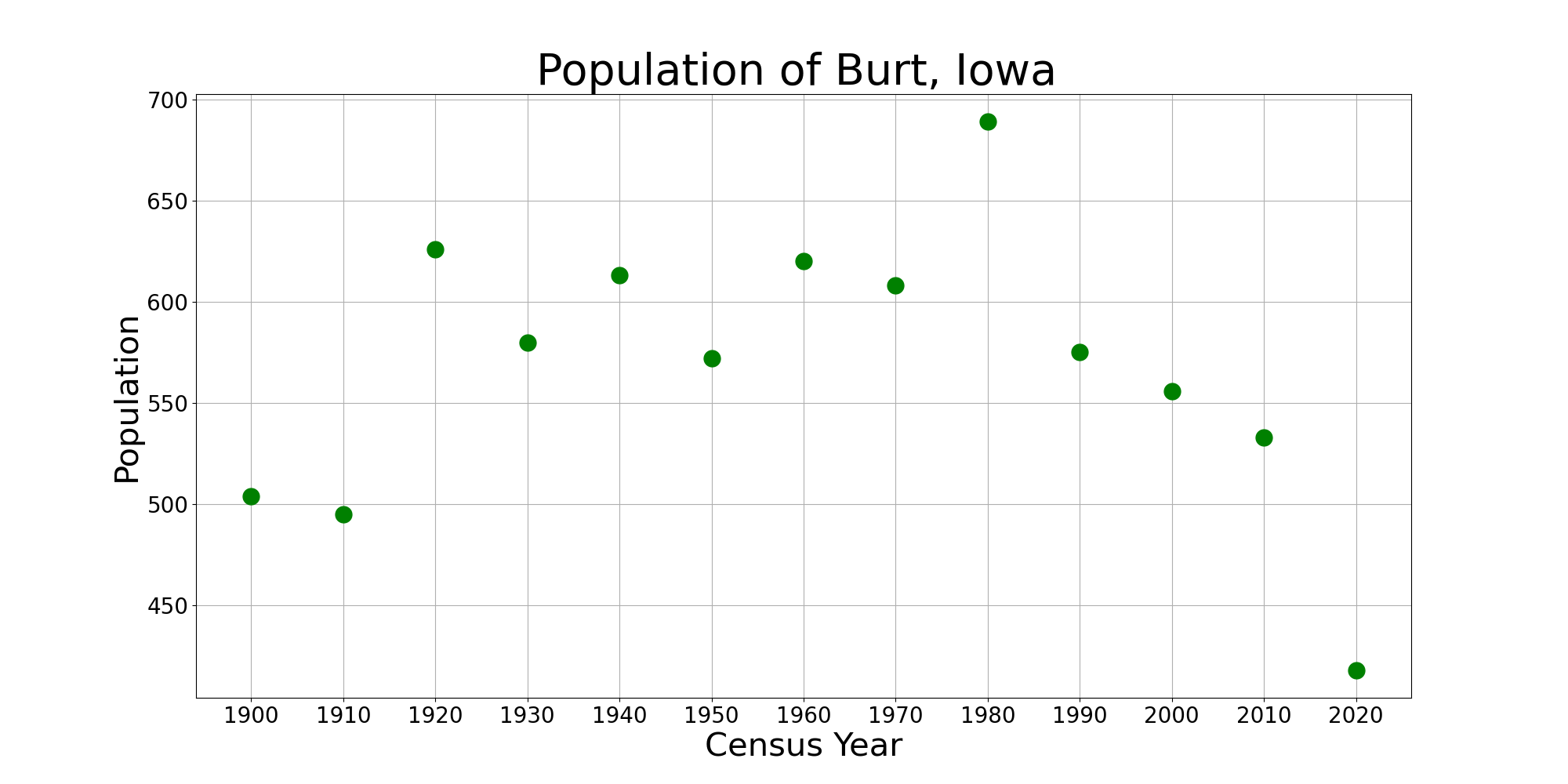
The population of Burt, Iowa from US census data

=== 2020 census ===
As of the census of 2020, there were 418 people, 196 households, and 116 families residing in the city. The population density was 982.6 inhabitants per square mile (379.4/km^{2}). There were 218 housing units at an average density of 512.4 per square mile (197.9/km^{2}). The racial makeup of the city was 93.8% White, 0.7% Black or African American, 0.0% Native American, 0.5% Asian, 0.0% Pacific Islander, 1.4% from other races and 3.6% from two or more races. Hispanic or Latino persons of any race comprised 3.6% of the population.

Of the 196 households, 22.4% of which had children under the age of 18 living with them, 47.4% were married couples living together, 5.1% were cohabitating couples, 26.5% had a female householder with no spouse or partner present and 20.9% had a male householder with no spouse or partner present. 40.8% of all households were non-families. 36.7% of all households were made up of individuals, 19.4% had someone living alone who was 65 years old or older.

The median age in the city was 47.1 years. 19.9% of the residents were under the age of 20; 5.5% were between the ages of 20 and 24; 21.5% were from 25 and 44; 25.8% were from 45 and 64; and 27.3% were 65 years of age or older. The gender makeup of the city was 46.9% male and 53.1% female.

=== 2010 census ===
As of the census of 2010, there were 533 people, 206 households, and 130 families residing in the city. The population density was 1,211.4 inhabitants per square mile (467.7/km^{2}). There were 232 housing units at an average density of 527.3 per square mile (203.6/km^{2}). The racial makeup of the city was 97.9% White, 0.2% African American, 0.4% from other races, and 1.5% from two or more races. Hispanic or Latino of any race were 1.3% of the population.

There were 206 households, of which 31.1% had children under the age of 18 living with them, 47.6% were married couples living together, 11.7% had a female householder with no husband present, 3.9% had a male householder with no wife present, and 36.9% were non-families. 32.5% of all households were made up of individuals, and 17.9% had someone living alone who was 65 years of age or older. The average household size was 2.40 and the average family size was 3.05.

The median age in the city was 38.2 years. 26.5% of residents were under the age of 18; 6.1% were between the ages of 18 and 24; 24.9% were from 25 to 44; 26.8% were from 45 to 64; and 15.6% were 65 years of age or older. The gender makeup of the city was 46.2% male and 53.8% female.

=== 2000 census ===
As of the census of 2000, there were 556 people, 223 households, and 148 families residing in the city. The population density was 1,294.2 inhabitants per square mile (499.7/km^{2}). There were 243 housing units at an average density of 565.6 per square mile (218.4/km^{2}). The racial makeup of the city was 99.64% White, 0.18% African American and 0.18% Asian. Hispanic or Latino of any race were 0.54% of the population.

There were 223 households, out of which 25.6% had children under the age of 18 living with them, 60.1% were married couples living together, 4.5% had a female householder with no husband present, and 33.6% were non-families. 31.8% of all households were made up of individuals, and 18.4% had someone living alone who was 65 years of age or older. The average household size was 2.28 and the average family size was 2.89.

In the city, the population was spread out, with 22.7% under the age of 18, 6.8% from 18 to 24, 27.5% from 25 to 44, 24.6% from 45 to 64, and 18.3% who were 65 years of age or older. The median age was 40 years. For every 100 females, there were 90.4 males. For every 100 females age 18 and over, there were 87.0 males.

The median income for a household in the city was $29,625, and the median income for a family was $39,464. Males had a median income of $28,833 versus $21,364 for females. The per capita income for the city was $15,727. About 9.3% of families and 17.1% of the population were below the poverty line, including 10.3% of those under age 18 and 33.0% of those age 65 or over.

== Education ==
The community is served by the Algona Community School District. It operates Algona High School.

Burt Community Schools previously served the community. The district, which had athletics teams known as the Bears, served the population for elementary, middle, and high school education until 1989. After that date, student participated in whole-grade sharing with nearby Sentral High School. On July 1, 2001, the Burt Community School District consolidated into the Algona district, which now serves students of all ages.

== Religion ==
There are two churches in Burt, both of the Protestant faith: St. John's Lutheran Church and Burt Presbyterian Church. A third church, United Methodist Church, was closed in September 2009 and a fourth church, the Full Gospel Church, closed in 1990. The cemetery that serves Burt is located on the far north end of town.

== Community groups ==
There are several community organizations in Burt. The Burt VFW, Lion's Club, Women's Club, Playground Committee, Summer Celebration Committee, and the Burt Library Board are all influential in planning activities and keeping the town active.

== Notable people ==
- Bob Thaves (1924-2006), cartoonist
