= Algona High School =

Public secondary school in Algona, Iowa, United States

Location
- 601 S. Hale; Algona, Iowa 50511; United States; 43.063683°N 94.22352°W

Information
- Type: Public
- Opened: 1970
- School district: Algona Community School District
- Superintendent: Joe Carter
- Principal: Jared Cecil
- Teaching staff: 31.30 (FTE)
- Grades: 9-12
- Enrollment: 471 (2023-2024)
- Student to teacher ratio: 15.05
- Campus type: Rural
- Colors: Red and black
- Athletics conference: North Central
- Mascot: Bulldog
- Website: algona.k12.ia.us/o/algonahs

Algona High School is a rural public high school located in the Algona Community School District in Algona, Iowa, United States. The Algona district includes Algona, Burt, Corwith, Lu Verne, Titonka, Wesley, and Whittemore.

The school is known for running its own public television channel (channel 4 TV) and having its own scholarship foundation.

== History ==
The building opened in 1970, replacing the 1931 building and annex.

Beginning in 2015, the Lu Verne Community School District sent its secondary students to Algona secondary schools; the Lu Verne district included Lu Verne, Corwith, and Wesley. Lu Verne CSD merged into Algona CSD in 2023.

== Athletics ==
The Bulldogs compete in the North Central Conference in the following sports:

- Cross Country
  - Boys' 2008 Class 3A State Champions
- Volleyball
- Football
- Basketball
- Swimming
- Wrestling
  - 6-time State Champions (1966, 1969, 1970, 1972, 1975, 1980)
- Track and Field
  - Boys' 1993 Class 3A State Champions
- Golf
  - Boys' 1987 Class 3A State Champions
  - Girls' 2-time Class 2A State Champions (1996, 1997)
- Baseball
- Softball

== Notable alumni ==
- Dick Dale (1943), best known as a featured singer and saxophone player on the television variety show The Lawrence Welk Show.

== See also ==
- List of high schools in Iowa
- Corwith–Wesley–Lu Verne High School
