= Kossuth County Courthouse (Iowa) =

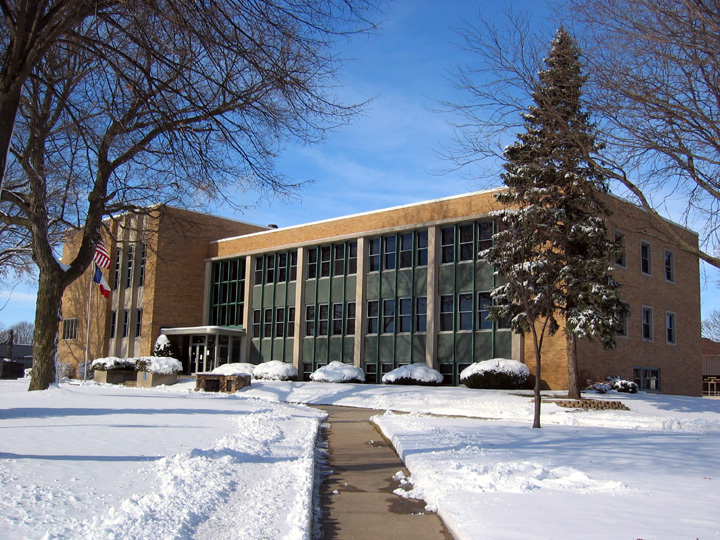
- Kossuth County Courthouse
- Interactive map of the Kossuth County Courthouse area

General information
- Type: Courthouse
- Architectural style: Modern
- Location: 114 W. State St., Algona, Iowa, United States
- Coordinates: 43.069279°N 94.238642°W
- Completed: 1955

Technical details
- Floor count: Three

Design and construction
- Architecture firm: Dougher, Rich & Woodburn
- Main contractor: Fagre Construction Company

The Kossuth County Courthouse is located in Algona, Iowa, United States. It is the third courthouse the county has used for court functions and county administration. For the first eleven years of the county's existence its government was housed in various buildings in Algona. Its first stand alone courthouse was a frame structure completed in 1867. An Italianate-style building with a 72-foot (22 m) high tower replaced it in 1874. A grand jury indicted several members of the board of supervisors alleging that construction bids were not given to the lowest bidders and non-courthouse funds were used in its construction. They were all found not guilty. After several grand jury inspections in the 1930s the building was labeled a fire hazard. A bond referendum to build a new courthouse passed on September 9, 1947, but the high cost of materials prevented construction at that time.

By 1952 it was determined that further use of the old courthouse was no longer feasible. Plans were made for a new building and the old building was taken down in 1953. The present three-story, brick, Modernist structure was completed in 1955. The Des Moines architectural firm of Dougher, Rich & Woodburn designed the building, and Fagre Construction Company was the general contractor. It was built for about $500,000. The building features a section on its west side that is taller and projects forward from the rest of the structure. The main entrance is located within the ell of the two sections. It has a projecting overhang and glass walls. The south elevation has vertical concrete dividers that divide it into five bays. Smaller vertical dividers further separate the windows within each bay. The roofline is flat. A semi-circular stone with "Court House A.D. 1872" etched onto it marks the location of the old courthouse.
