= Wesley, Iowa =

- City
- Motto: "Quality Life In The Heartland"
- Location of Wesley, Iowa
- Coordinates: 43°05′28″N 93°59′50″W
- Country: USA
- State: Iowa
- County: Kossuth

Area
  - Total: 0.67 sq mi (1.73 km^{2})
  - Land: 0.67 sq mi (1.73 km^{2})
  - Water: 0 sq mi (0.00 km^{2})
- Elevation: 1,253 ft (382 m)

Population (2020)
  - Total: 391
  - Density: 586.8/sq mi (226.58/km^{2})
- Time zone: UTC-6 (Central (CST))
  - Summer (DST): UTC-5 (CDT)
- ZIP code: 50483
- Area code: 515
- FIPS code: 19-83415
- GNIS feature ID: 2397258
- Website: City of Wesley, Iowa Website

Wesley is a city in Kossuth County, Iowa, United States. The population was 391 at the time of the 2020 census.

== History ==
Wesley was founded April 13, 1872 and incorporated on March 26, 1892.

== Geography ==
According to the United States Census Bureau, the city has a total area of 0.58 square miles (1.50 km^{2}), all land.

== Demographics ==
Historical populations
Year	Pop.	±%
1890	440	—
1900	730	+65.9%
1910	457	−37.4%
1920	444	−2.8%
1930	462	+4.1%
1940	468	+1.3%
1950	509	+8.8%
1960	514	+1.0%
1970	548	+6.6%
1980	598	+9.1%
1990	444	−25.8%
2000	467	+5.2%
2010	390	−16.5%
2020	391	+0.3%
Source:"U.S. Census website". United States Census Bureau. and Iowa Data Center; Source: U.S. Decennial Census

=== 2020 census ===
As of the census of 2020, there were 391 people, 180 households, and 111 families residing in the city. The population density was 589.5 inhabitants per square mile (227.6/km^{2}). There were 189 housing units at an average density of 285.0 per square mile (110.0/km^{2}). The racial makeup of the city was 97.7% White, 0.0% Black or African American, 0.0% Native American, 0.3% Asian, 0.3% Pacific Islander, 0.0% from other races and 1.8% from two or more races. Hispanic or Latino persons of any race comprised 3.1% of the population.

Of the 180 households, 30.0% of which had children under the age of 18 living with them, 47.2% were married couples living together, 7.2% were cohabitating couples, 20.6% had a female householder with no spouse or partner present and 25.0% had a male householder with no spouse or partner present. 38.3% of all households were non-families. 30.6% of all households were made up of individuals, 14.4% had someone living alone who was 65 years old or older.

The median age in the city was 43.1 years. 24.8% of the residents were under the age of 20; 3.8% were between the ages of 20 and 24; 24.3% were from 25 and 44; 28.6% were from 45 and 64; and 18.4% were 65 years of age or older. The gender makeup of the city was 53.2% male and 46.8% female.

=== 2010 census ===
As of the census of 2010, there were 390 people, 171 households, and 110 families living in the city. The population density was 672.4 inhabitants per square mile (259.6/km^{2}). There were 197 housing units at an average density of 339.7 per square mile (131.2/km^{2}). The racial makeup of the city was 99.5% White, 0.3% Asian, and 0.3% from two or more races. Hispanic or Latino of any race were 2.3% of the population.

There were 171 households, of which 28.1% had children under the age of 18 living with them, 50.9% were married couples living together, 8.2% had a female householder with no husband present, 5.3% had a male householder with no wife present, and 35.7% were non-families. 31.6% of all households were made up of individuals, and 16.4% had someone living alone who was 65 years of age or older. The average household size was 2.28 and the average family size was 2.84.

The median age in the city was 42.4 years. 22.8% of residents were under the age of 18; 5.7% were between the ages of 18 and 24; 25.8% were from 25 to 44; 24.1% were from 45 to 64; and 21.5% were 65 years of age or older. The gender makeup of the city was 52.3% male and 47.7% female.

=== 2000 census ===
As of the census of 2000, there were 467 people, 189 households, and 130 families living in the city. The population density was 811.4 inhabitants per square mile (313.3/km^{2}). There were 200 housing units at an average density of 347.5 per square mile (134.2/km^{2}). The racial makeup of the city was 99.14% White, 0.86% from other races. Hispanic or Latino of any race were 0.86% of the population.

There were 189 households, out of which 29.6% had children under the age of 18 living with them, 56.6% were married couples living together, 7.9% had a female householder with no husband present, and 31.2% were non-families. 29.6% of all households were made up of individuals, and 17.5% had someone living alone who was 65 years of age or older. The average household size was 2.47 and the average family size was 3.04.

In the city, the population was spread out, with 27.8% under the age of 18, 4.9% from 18 to 24, 25.7% from 25 to 44, 18.8% from 45 to 64, and 22.7% who were 65 years of age or older. The median age was 39 years. For every 100 females, there were 103.9 males. For every 100 females age 18 and over, there were 92.6 males.

The median income for a household in the city was $39,688, and the median income for a family was $47,500. Males had a median income of $30,568 versus $21,250 for females. The per capita income for the city was $19,225. About 6.3% of families and 11.0% of the population were below the poverty line, including 14.6% of those under age 18 and 13.4% of those age 65 or over.

== Education ==
Algona Community School District is the area school district.

Corwith–Wesley Community School District served the community until it dissolved on July 1, 2015. That district operated a school in Wesley and Corwith–Wesley–Lu Verne High School in Corwith.

In 2009 the Wesley campus closed since the district had been sending students to Lu Verne. The district sold it to the city government, which primarily used it as a storage center, and had removed the school's utilities. Later, Lu Verne Community School District became the area school district. Since 2015 Lu Verne sendt its secondary students to Algona CSD, which operates Algona Middle School and Algona High School. In 2023, Lu Verne CSD merged into Algona CSD.

== Notable people ==
- Showboat Fisher, Major League Baseball player
