= Whittemore, Iowa =

- City
- Location of Whittemore, Iowa
- Coordinates: 43°03′48″N 94°25′31″W
- Country: USA
- State: Iowa
- County: Kossuth

Area
  - Total: 0.41 sq mi (1.05 km^{2})
  - Land: 0.41 sq mi (1.05 km^{2})
  - Water: 0 sq mi (0.00 km^{2})
- Elevation: 1,204 ft (367 m)

Population (2020)
  - Total: 497
  - Density: 1,223.6/sq mi (472.45/km^{2})
- Time zone: UTC-6 (Central (CST))
  - Summer (DST): UTC-5 (CDT)
- ZIP code: 50598
- Area code: 515
- FIPS code: 19-85260
- GNIS feature ID: 2397307
- Website: www.whittemoreiowa.com

Whittemore is a city in Kossuth County, Iowa, United States. The population was 497 at the time of the 2020 census.

== History ==
Whittemore was platted in 1878 in anticipation of the railroad being built through the neighborhood.

== Geography ==
According to the United States Census Bureau, the city has a total area of 0.42 square miles (1.09 km^{2}), all land.

== Demographics ==
Historical populations
Year	Pop.	±%
1880	105	—
1890	578	+450.5%
1900	522	−9.7%
1910	518	−0.8%
1920	618	+19.3%
1930	604	−2.3%
1940	671	+11.1%
1950	678	+1.0%
1960	741	+9.3%
1970	658	−11.2%
1980	647	−1.7%
1990	535	−17.3%
2000	530	−0.9%
2010	504	−4.9%
2020	497	−1.4%
Source:"U.S. Census website". United States Census Bureau. and Iowa Data Center; Source: U.S. Decennial Census

=== 2020 census ===
As of the census of 2020, there were 497 people, 203 households, and 131 families residing in the city. The population density was 1,223.6 inhabitants per square mile (472.5/km^{2}). There were 241 housing units at an average density of 593.4 per square mile (229.1/km^{2}). The racial makeup of the city was 94.0% White, 0.2% Black or African American, 0.0% Native American, 0.2% Asian, 0.0% Pacific Islander, 2.4% from other races and 3.2% from two or more races. Hispanic or Latino persons of any race comprised 4.2% of the population.

Of the 203 households, 26.6% of which had children under the age of 18 living with them, 53.7% were married couples living together, 6.9% were cohabitating couples, 16.7% had a female householder with no spouse or partner present and 22.7% had a male householder with no spouse or partner present. 35.5% of all households were non-families. 30.0% of all households were made up of individuals, 16.3% had someone living alone who was 65 years old or older.

The median age in the city was 38.3 years. 27.8% of the residents were under the age of 20; 4.6% were between the ages of 20 and 24; 26.8% were from 25 and 44; 22.7% were from 45 and 64; and 18.1% were 65 years of age or older. The gender makeup of the city was 52.1% male and 47.9% female.

=== 2010 census ===
As of the census of 2010, there were 504 people, 223 households, and 135 families living in the city. The population density was 1,200.0 inhabitants per square mile (463.3/km^{2}). There were 250 housing units at an average density of 595.2 per square mile (229.8/km^{2}). The racial makeup of the city was 98.0% White, 0.2% African American, 0.2% Native American, 0.8% from other races, and 0.8% from two or more races. Hispanic or Latino of any race were 1.6% of the population.

There were 223 households, of which 27.8% had children under the age of 18 living with them, 51.1% were married couples living together, 5.8% had a female householder with no husband present, 3.6% had a male householder with no wife present, and 39.5% were non-families. 36.3% of all households were made up of individuals, and 17.5% had someone living alone who was 65 years of age or older. The average household size was 2.26 and the average family size was 2.99.

The median age in the city was 39.2 years. 26.4% of residents were under the age of 18; 3.9% were between the ages of 18 and 24; 24.4% were from 25 to 44; 26.7% were from 45 to 64; and 18.5% were 65 years of age or older. The gender makeup of the city was 51.0% male and 49.0% female.

=== 2000 census ===
As of the census of 2000, there were 530 people, 229 households, and 135 families living in the city. The population density was 1,268.3 inhabitants per square mile (489.7/km^{2}). There were 250 housing units at an average density of 598.3 per square mile (231.0/km^{2}). The racial makeup of the city was 99.62% White, and 0.38% from two or more races.

There were 229 households, out of which 29.7% had children under the age of 18 living with them, 50.7% were married couples living together, 5.7% had a female householder with no husband present, and 41.0% were non-families. 38.0% of all households were made up of individuals, and 25.3% had someone living alone who was 65 years of age or older. The average household size was 2.31 and the average family size was 3.12.

27.9% were under the age of 18, 7.7% from 18 to 24, 22.5% from 25 to 44, 16.2% from 45 to 64, and 25.7% were 65 years of age or older. The median age was 39 years. For every 100 females, there were 92.7 males. For every 100 females age 18 and over, there were 88.2 males.

The median income for a household in the city was $31,111, and the median income for a family was $37,031. Males had a median income of $30,104 versus $17,500 for females. The per capita income for the city was $14,669. About 2.8% of families and 6.6% of the population were below the poverty line, including 5.0% of those under age 18 and 10.8% of those age 65 or over.

== Education ==
The community is served by the Algona Community School District, which operates Algona High School.

== Parks and recreation ==
Whittemore has two parks: Noah Park and Siems Park. Noah Park, centrally located, features a playground with slides and swings and a baseball diamond, while Siems Park is located approximately two miles outside of town and features fishing, camping, a shelterhouse and a small playground. The city also maintains a swimming pool.
