= Sue Mullins =

American politician (born 1936)

Sue B. (née Blunt) Mullins (born June 18, 1936) was an American farmer and politician.

Born in Denver, Colorado, Mullins graduated from Evanston Township High School in Evanston, Illinois. In 1967, Mullins received her bachelor's degree from Iowa State University in home economics, mass communications, and journalism. Mullins and her husband James Mullins owned Prairie Flat Farms in Corwith, Iowa. From 1979 to 1989, Mullins served in the Iowa House of Representatives and was a Republican.
