= West Side Third Avenue SW Commercial Historic District =

Historic district in Iowa, United States

- U.S. National Register of Historic Places
- U.S. Historic district
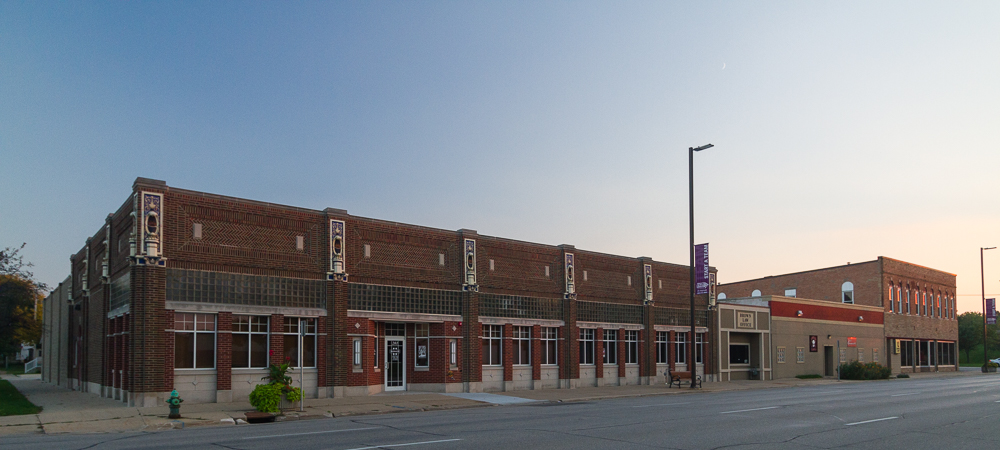

- Location within Iowa Location within the United States
- Location: 3rd Avenue SW, between 1st and 3rd streets SW, Cedar Rapids, Iowa
- Coordinates: 41°58′27.1″N 91°40′23.5″W
- Area: 5.36 acres (2.17 ha)
- MPS: Commercial & Industrial Development of Cedar Rapids MPS
- NRHP reference No.: 14000323
- Added to NRHP: June 13, 2014

The West Side Third Avenue SW Commercial Historic District is a nationally recognized historic district located in Cedar Rapids, Iowa, United States. It was listed on the National Register of Historic Places in 2014. At the time of its nomination it consisted of 10 resources, which included seven contributing buildings and three non-contributing buildings. Cedar Rapids was platted on the east bank of the Cedar River as Rapids City in 1841, and it was incorporated in 1849. Kingston was established on the west bank of the river in 1852, and it was annexed by Cedar Rapids in 1870. The streets were laid out parallel and perpendicular to the river, which flowed from the northwest to the southeast. The Chicago, Iowa & Nebraska Railway, later the Chicago & North Western Railway, was the prominent railroad on the west side of town. The first bridge across the river at Third Avenue was built in 1871. The current bridge was completed in 1912. Prior to a bridge, Rapid City and Kingston were connected by a ferry operated by David W. King, the founder of Kingston.

Initially residential, Third Avenue west of the river became increasingly commercial in the 1880s. The buildings that make up the historic district date from 1909 to 1942, and are representative of the various architectural styles and vernacular building forms that were popular during this time period. Two of the non-contributing buildings are more recent construction, while the third has been significantly altered. The buildings here are one to two stories in height and feature masonry facades, ground-floor storefronts, and uniform alignment that creates a uniform street wall. The buildings have housed a variety of commercial functions that include a bank, retail and wholesale stores, and professional offices. Peoples Savings Bank (1911) is individually listed on the National Register of Historic Places.
