= Corwith–Wesley Community School District =

Former school district in Iowa, United States

Corwith–Wesley Community School District was a school district based in Corwith, Iowa, serving Corwith and Wesley. The district occupied sections of Hancock and Kossuth counties as well as a small portion of Wright County.

== History ==
In 1984, Corwith–Wesley established a grade-sharing arrangement, in which it operated Corwith-Wesley-Lu Verne High School, with the Lu Verne Community School District sending its secondary students there. This continued for the remainder of the district's existence.

On July 1, 1988, the Boone Valley Community School District dissolved, with a portion assigned to Corwith–Wesley.

By 2013, there were 115 students of all grade levels within the Corwith–Wesley district and 86 in the Lu Verne district; districts cannot merge under Iowa law if they have fewer than 200 students total, and lower enrollments means getting less funds from the Iowa state government. At the time the two districts were trying to find a third school district for a new grade-sharing arrangement. In April 2013 all of the board members of Corwith-Wesley voted to have such an agreement with the Algona Community School District.

In September 2014, Corwith–Wesley residents voted to dissolve their district on a 101–78 basis. The district dissolved on July 1, 2015, with portions going to the Algona, Clarion–Goldfield–Dows, LuVerne and West Hancock districts. LuVerne received the majority of the territory, with 87% of the land. Most of its primary students were scheduled to go to Lu Verne schools and most of its secondary students were scheduled to go to Algona schools.

== Schools ==
The Corwith school building had three stories. It closed in 2015, and its demolition was anticipated in 2016.

In 2009, the Wesley campus closed since the district had been sending students to LuVerne. The district sold it to the city government, which in 2014 primarily used it as a storage center, and had removed the school's utilities.
