= Algona, Iowa =

- City
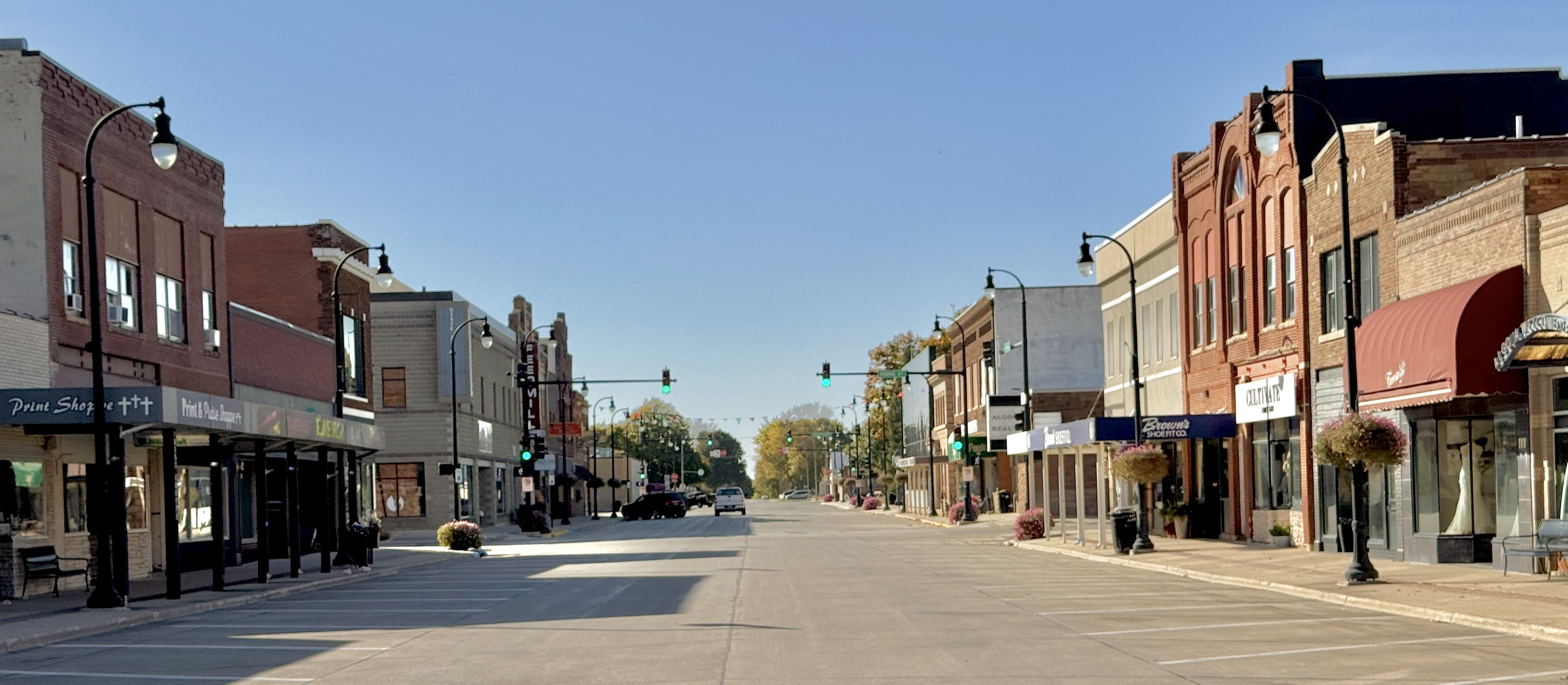
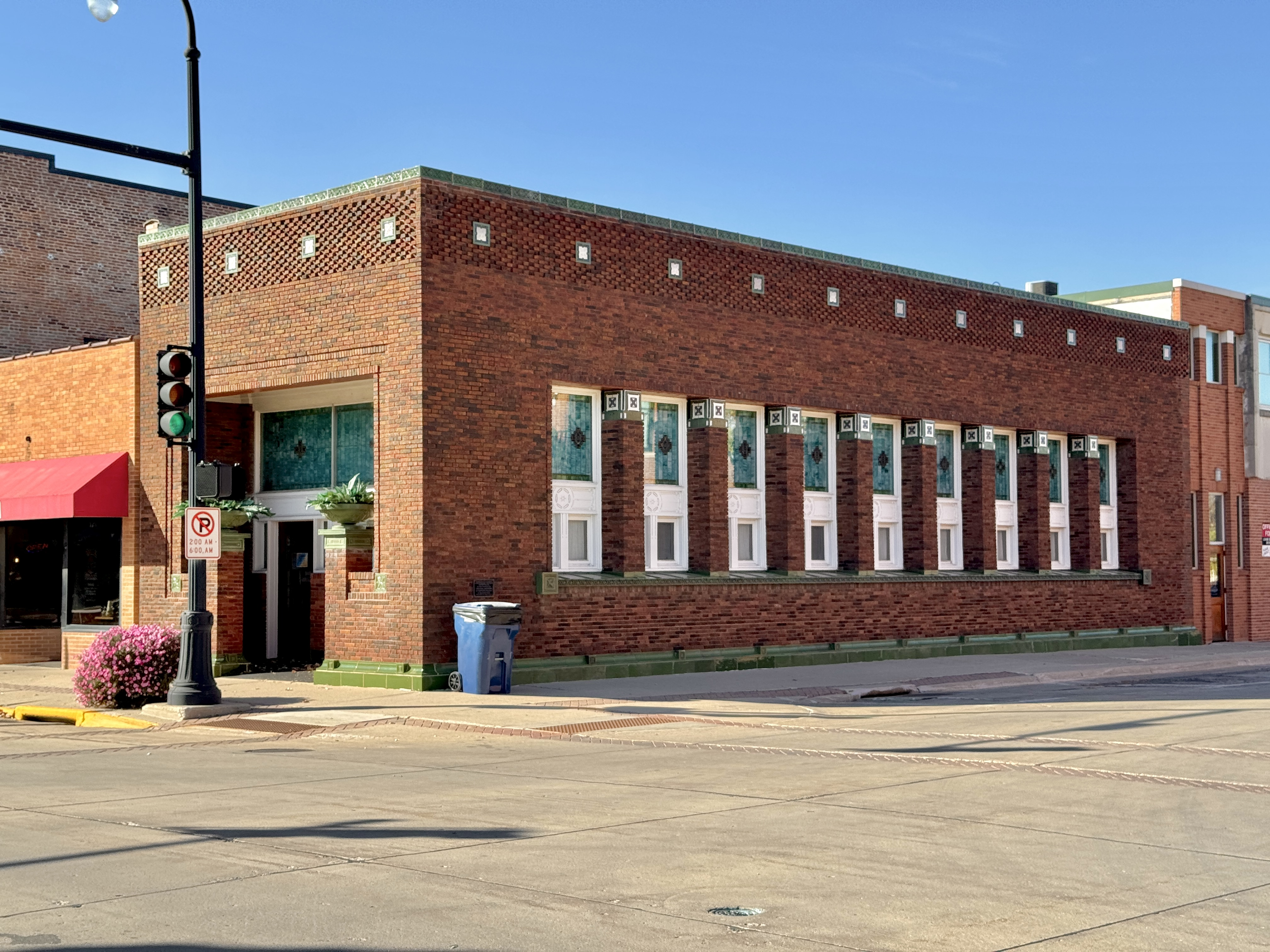
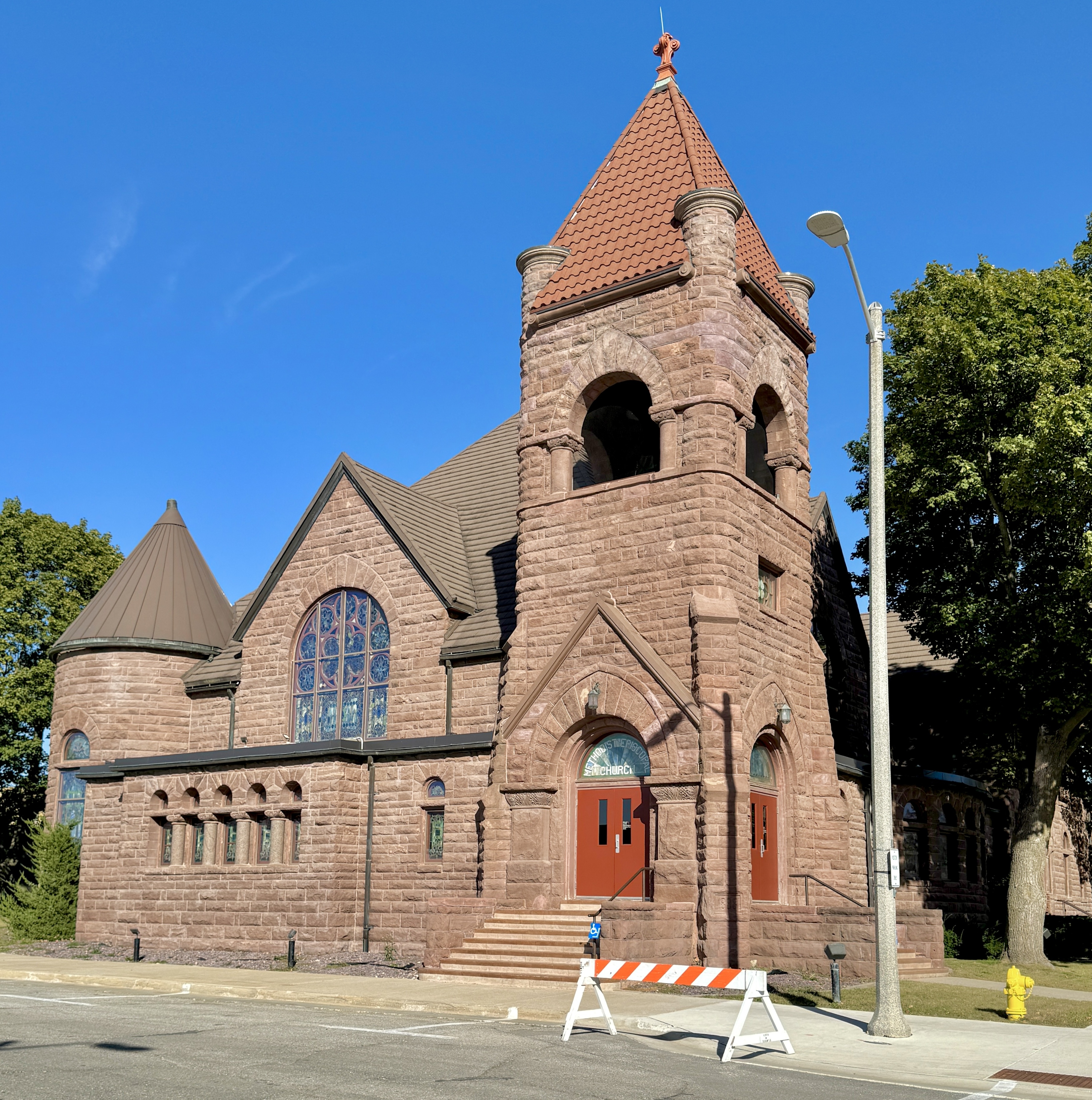
- State Street, Downtown Algona Henry Adams Building Algona First Methodist Church

- Location of Algona, Iowa
- Coordinates: 43°04′35″N 94°14′45″W
- Country: United States
- State: Iowa
- County: Kossuth

Area
  - Total: 4.53 sq mi (11.74 km^{2})
  - Land: 4.53 sq mi (11.72 km^{2})
  - Water: 0.0077 sq mi (0.02 km^{2})
- Elevation: 1,188 ft (362 m)

Population (2020)
  - Total: 5,487
  - Density: 1,212.5/sq mi (468.16/km^{2})
- Time zone: UTC-6 (Central (CST))
  - Summer (DST): UTC-5 (CDT)
- ZIP code: 50511
- Area code: 515
- FIPS code: 19-01135
- GNIS feature ID: 467384
- Website: www.algonaiowa.gov

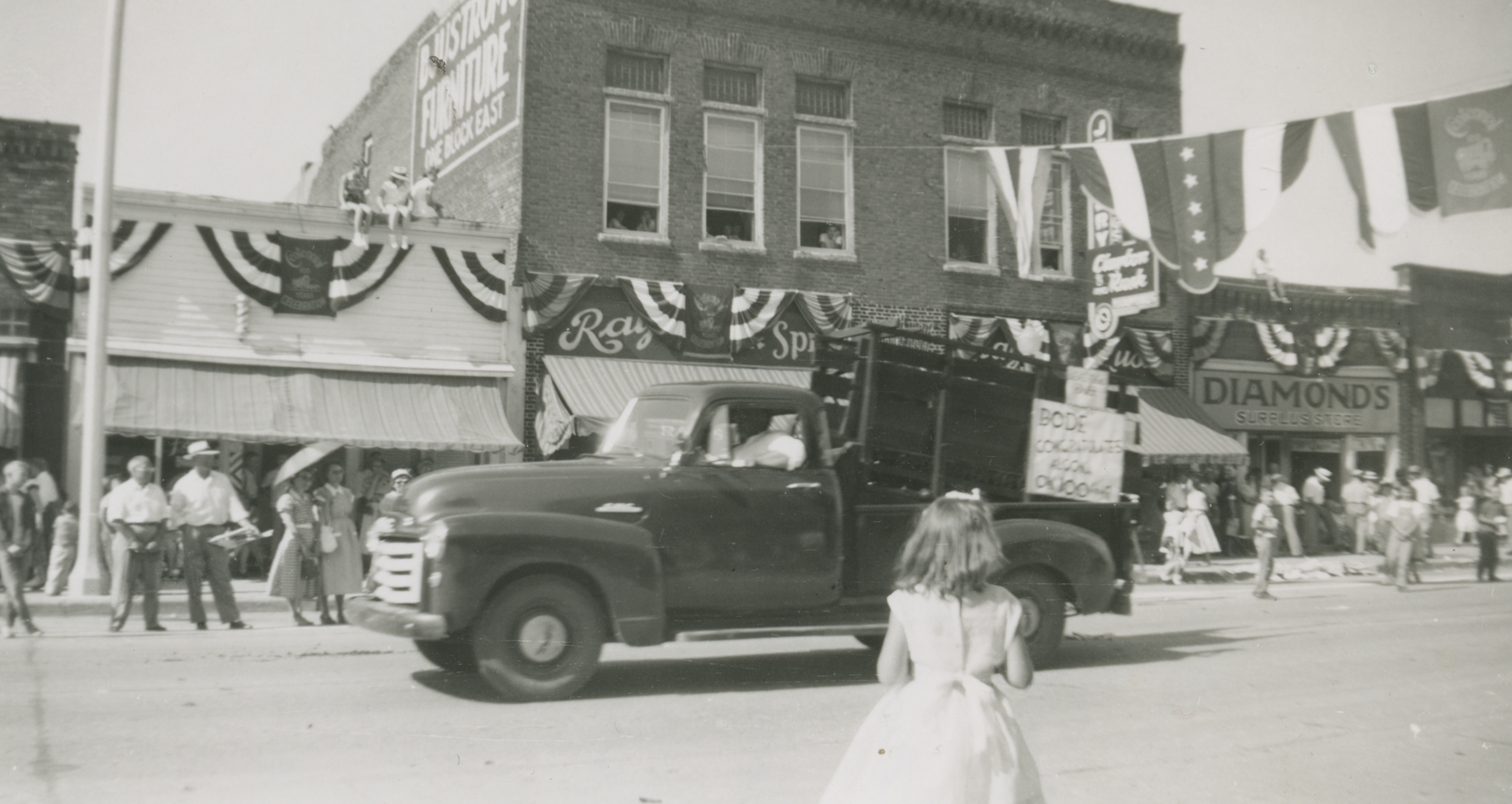
Main Street, 1954

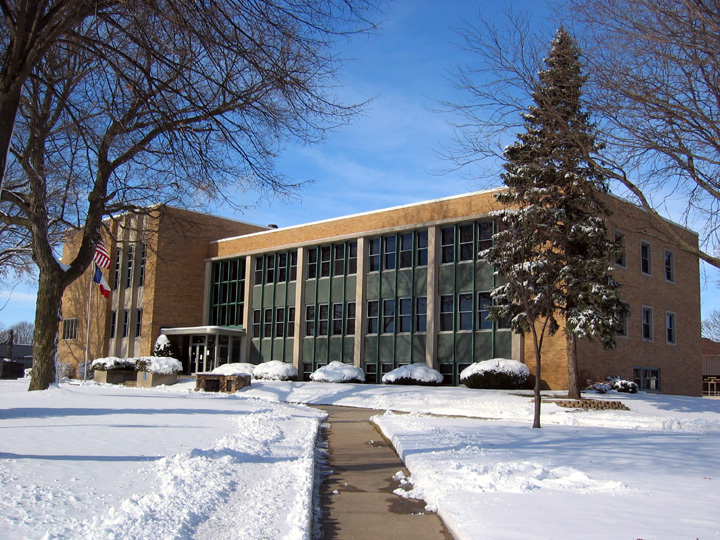
Kossuth County Courthouse

Algona is a city in and the county seat of Kossuth County, Iowa, United States. The population was 5,487 at the 2020 census. Ambrose A. Call State Park is located two miles southwest of the city.

== History ==
Algona was founded in 1854 and was named after the Algonquian word for "Algonquin waters".

Between 1869 and 1875 the community was the location of Algona College, an institution sponsored by the Methodist Church.

In 1894, Algona, along with other Iowa communities such as Dysart and Wesley, became part of the project known as the "Orphan Trains". As New York City saw booming immigration, it also inevitably saw a rise in the number of orphans in its asylums. Unable to provide adequate care for them, it saw fit to ship nearly 100,000 westward to start a new life with families across America. Algona itself welcomed nearly 100 orphans into the town, many of whom remained lifelong residents.

From 1902 to 1906, Algona played host to the Algona Brownies, an African American barnstorming baseball team and interracial team the first two seasons. Despite being declared Western champions in 1903, the team disbanded as an interracial team that same year. The Algona Brownies were an independent interracial baseball team that played in the 1902 and 1903 seasons. They primarily made up of former members of the Chicago Unions, Columbia Giants, and Chicago Union Giants teams. After 1903, the team makeup changed from having both black and white players to a team of only black players. That year, their final year, they won the Western championship, defeating the Chicago Union Giants in a challenge playoff.

The Henry Adams Building, designed by Louis Sullivan in 1913 is located at the northwest corner of East State and Moore streets. Although not designed to be a bank, the building is nonetheless considered to be one of Sullivan's "Jewel Boxes," a series of banks built in the Midwest from 1909 through 1919.

Algona was the location of a German prisoner of war camp during World War II. From 1943 to 1946 Camp Algona held nearly 10,000 prisoners, many of whom were put to work on farms that had family fighting overseas. As a main camp Algona had numerous sub-camps with a couple dozen in Minnesota. A museum now commemorates the camp's history including a nativity scene created by the POWs.

A destructive F3 tornado killed two people and destroyed a large part of Algona on June 28, 1979, about 7:15 PM. The tornado moved in a south-southeast direction through Algona. Severe damage was done to the central business district and a number of homes were rendered uninhabitable. Near F4 damage was reported in some locations. There was about 15 minutes' warning and the tornado sirens were sounded well before the arrival of the tornado. The fact that it was still daylight also contributed to the relatively low death count from this destructive storm.

In 2003, Algona drew national attention when it announced the purchase of the world's largest Cheetos puff. It was meant as a plan to bring tourism to the town to see the puff by a local radio DJ.

== Geography ==
Algona is located along the East Fork Des Moines River.

According to the United States Census Bureau, the city has a total area of 4.51 square miles (11.7 km^{2}), of which 4.49 square miles (11.6 km^{2}) is land and 0.02 square mile (0.05 km^{2}) is water.

=== Climate ===
Climate data for Algona, Iowa, 1991–2020 normals, extremes 1893–present
Month	Jan	Feb	Mar	Apr	May	Jun	Jul	Aug	Sep	Oct	Nov	Dec	Year
Record high °F (°C)	66 (19)	70 (21)	87 (31)	95 (35)	106 (41)	105 (41)	108 (42)	110 (43)	100 (38)	94 (34)	81 (27)	68 (20)	110 (43)
Mean maximum °F (°C)	43.9 (6.6)	49.0 (9.4)	68.2 (20.1)	82.6 (28.1)	89.6 (32.0)	92.7 (33.7)	91.9 (33.3)	89.7 (32.1)	88.6 (31.4)	83.2 (28.4)	66.5 (19.2)	48.4 (9.1)	95.3 (35.2)
Mean daily maximum °F (°C)	24.9 (−3.9)	29.3 (−1.5)	42.7 (5.9)	58.4 (14.7)	70.5 (21.4)	80.2 (26.8)	83.1 (28.4)	80.6 (27.0)	75.2 (24.0)	61.8 (16.6)	44.7 (7.1)	30.5 (−0.8)	56.8 (13.8)
Daily mean °F (°C)	15.4 (−9.2)	19.8 (−6.8)	32.6 (0.3)	46.1 (7.8)	58.5 (14.7)	69.0 (20.6)	72.1 (22.3)	69.7 (20.9)	62.6 (17.0)	49.7 (9.8)	34.3 (1.3)	21.6 (−5.8)	45.9 (7.7)
Mean daily minimum °F (°C)	6.0 (−14.4)	10.2 (−12.1)	22.6 (−5.2)	33.8 (1.0)	46.5 (8.1)	57.8 (14.3)	61.2 (16.2)	58.8 (14.9)	50.1 (10.1)	37.5 (3.1)	23.9 (−4.5)	12.8 (−10.7)	35.1 (1.7)
Mean minimum °F (°C)	−15.2 (−26.2)	−10.3 (−23.5)	0.3 (−17.6)	20.8 (−6.2)	34.4 (1.3)	47.0 (8.3)	51.3 (10.7)	49.3 (9.6)	35.6 (2.0)	21.9 (−5.6)	6.3 (−14.3)	−8.4 (−22.4)	−17.9 (−27.7)
Record low °F (°C)	−35 (−37)	−36 (−38)	−25 (−32)	6 (−14)	21 (−6)	35 (2)	42 (6)	37 (3)	22 (−6)	3 (−16)	−17 (−27)	−30 (−34)	−36 (−38)
Average precipitation inches (mm)	0.90 (23)	1.04 (26)	1.95 (50)	3.36 (85)	4.72 (120)	5.49 (139)	4.13 (105)	4.27 (108)	3.27 (83)	2.44 (62)	1.46 (37)	1.06 (27)	34.09 (865)
Average snowfall inches (cm)	10.0 (25)	10.3 (26)	5.6 (14)	1.8 (4.6)	0.0 (0.0)	0.0 (0.0)	0.0 (0.0)	0.0 (0.0)	0.0 (0.0)	0.3 (0.76)	3.7 (9.4)	9.8 (25)	41.5 (104.76)
Average precipitation days (≥ 0.01 in)	5.2	5.2	6.7	9.9	13.1	11.9	9.3	8.8	8.6	7.4	5.7	5.8	97.6
Average snowy days (≥ 0.1 in)	4.6	4.3	2.6	0.9	0.0	0.0	0.0	0.0	0.0	0.2	2.0	4.2	18.8
Source 1: NOAA
Source 2: National Weather Service

== Demographics ==
Historical populations
Year	Pop.	±%
1870	860	—
1880	1,359	+58.0%
1890	2,068	+52.2%
1900	2,911	+40.8%
1910	2,908	−0.1%
1920	3,724	+28.1%
1930	3,985	+7.0%
1940	4,954	+24.3%
1950	5,415	+9.3%
1960	5,702	+5.3%
1970	6,032	+5.8%
1980	6,289	+4.3%
1990	6,015	−4.4%
2000	5,741	−4.6%
2010	5,560	−3.2%
2020	5,487	−1.3%
Source:"U.S. Census website". United States Census Bureau. and Iowa Data Center; Source: U.S. Decennial Census

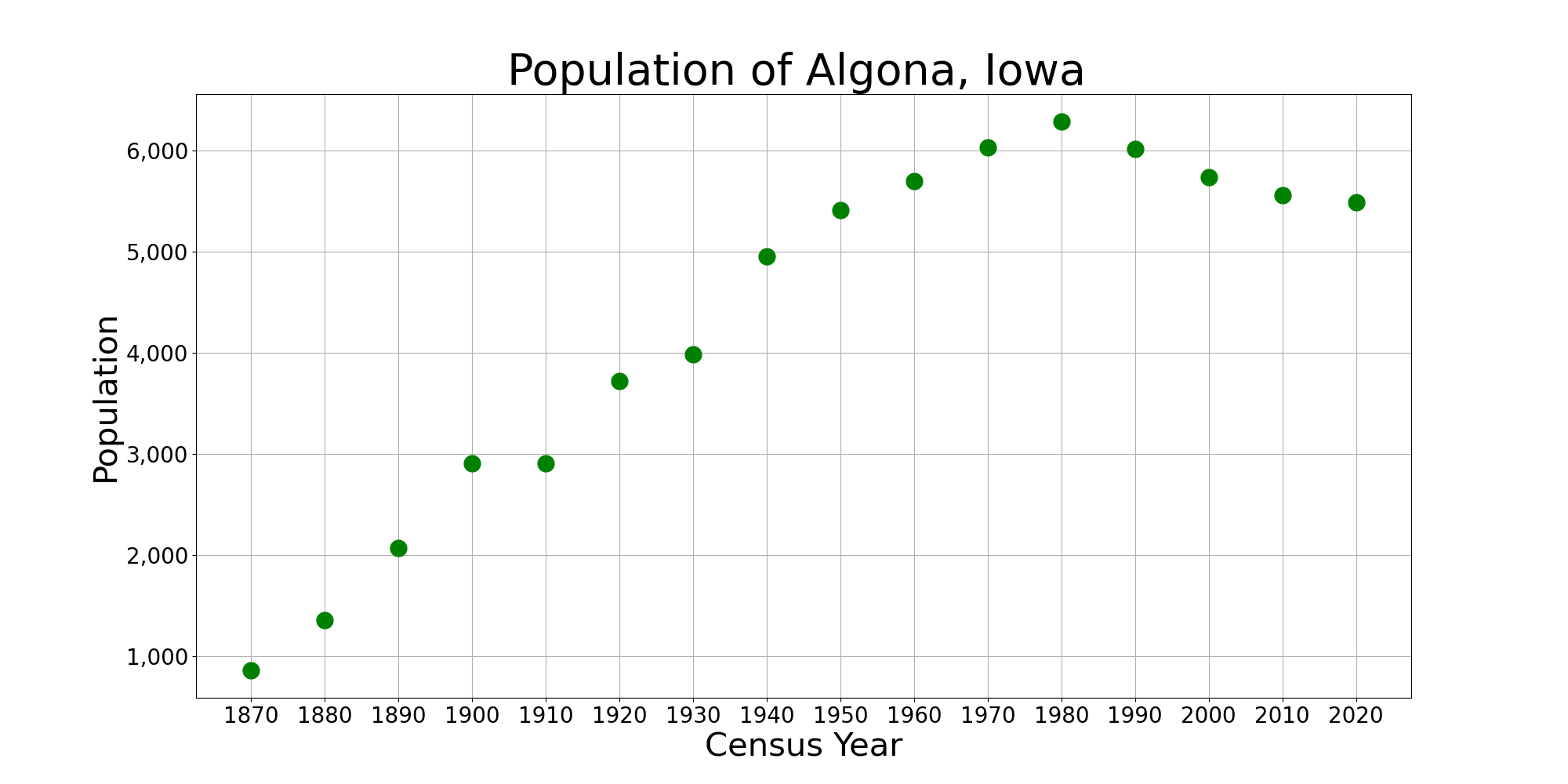
The population of Algona, Iowa from US census data

=== 2020 census ===
As of the 2020 census, there were 5,487 people, 2,429 households, and 1,369 families residing in the city. The population density was 1,212.5 inhabitants per square mile (468.2/km^{2}). There were 2,706 housing units at an average density of 598.0 per square mile (230.9/km^{2}).

The median age in the city was 45.6 years. 22.7% of residents were under the age of 20; 3.9% were between the ages of 20 and 24; 22.9% were from 25 to 44; 24.5% were from 45 to 64; and 26.1% were 65 years of age or older. For every 100 females, there were 92.7 males, and for every 100 females age 18 and over, there were 90.2 males.

Of the 2,429 households, 23.8% had children under the age of 18 living with them. 44.5% were married-couple households, 5.6% were cohabiting-couple households, 20.5% had a male householder with no spouse or partner present, and 29.4% had a female householder with no spouse or partner present. 43.6% of all households were non-families; 38.9% of all households were made up of individuals, and 18.8% had someone living alone who was 65 years of age or older.

There were 2,706 housing units, of which 10.2% were vacant. The homeowner vacancy rate was 3.2% and the rental vacancy rate was 16.3%. 98.8% of residents lived in urban areas, while 1.2% lived in rural areas.

Racial composition as of the 2020 census
Race	Number	Percent
White	4,993	91.0%
Black or African American	44	0.8%
American Indian and Alaska Native	2	0.0%
Asian	47	0.9%
Native Hawaiian and Other Pacific Islander	0	0.0%
Some other race	120	2.2%
Two or more races	281	5.1%
Hispanic or Latino (of any race)	345	6.3%

=== 2010 census ===
As of the census of 2010, there were 5,560 people, 2,499 households, and 1,495 families living in the city. The population density was 1,238.3 inhabitants per square mile (478.1/km^{2}). There were 2,711 housing units at an average density of 603.8 per square mile (233.1/km^{2}). The racial makeup of the city was 97.2% White, 0.5% African American, 0.1% Native American, 0.7% Asian, 0.4% from other races, and 1.0% from two or more races. Hispanic or Latino of any race were 1.4% of the population.

There were 2,499 households, of which 25.2% had children under the age of 18 living with them, 48.3% were married couples living together, 7.9% had a female householder with no husband present, 3.6% had a male householder with no wife present, and 40.2% were non-families. 36.3% of all households were made up of individuals, and 18.1% had someone living alone who was 65 years of age or older. The average household size was 2.16 and the average family size was 2.79.

The median age in the city was 46.2 years. 21.9% of residents were under the age of 18; 6% were between the ages of 18 and 24; 20.8% were from 25 to 44; 27.1% were from 45 to 64; and 24.3% were 65 years of age or older. The gender makeup of the city was 47.5% male and 52.5% female.

=== 2000 census ===
As of the census of 2000, there were 5,741 people, 2,434 households, and 1,550 families living in the city. The population density was 1,279.4 inhabitants per square mile (494.0/km^{2}). There were 2,640 housing units at an average density of 588.3 per square mile (227.1/km^{2}). The racial makeup of the city was 98.38% White, 0.09% African American, 0.19% Native American, 0.80% Asian, 0.02% Pacific Islander, 0.24% from other races, and 0.28% from two or more races. Hispanic or Latino of any race were 0.71% of the population.

There were 2,434 households, out of which 29.8% had children under the age of 18 living with them, 52.8% were married couples living together, 8.1% had a female householder with no husband present, and 36.3% were non-families. 32.9% of all households were made up of individuals, and 16.8% had someone living alone who was 65 years of age or older. The average household size was 2.29 and the average family size was 2.92.

Age spread: 24.5% under the age of 18, 7.1% from 18 to 24, 24.1% from 25 to 44, 23.1% from 45 to 64, and 21.2% who were 65 years of age or older. The median age was 42 years. For every 100 females, there were 87.7 males. For every 100 females age 18 and over, there were 83.6 males.

The median income for a household in the city was $32,207, and the median income for a family was $41,210. Males had a median income of $31,504 versus $20,667 for females. The per capita income for the city was $16,979. About 7.9% of families and 10.8% of the population were below the poverty line, including 14.9% of those under age 18 and 6.2% of those age 65 or over.

== Education ==
There are two school systems in Algona. The Algona Community School District oversees the public school system. Algona High School has students from Algona Middle School, as well as students from several nearby towns, including grade-shared districts and from open enrollment. The public elementary schools in Algona are Lucia Wallace Elementary, Bryant Elementary, and Bertha Godfrey Elementary School.

The Catholic school system is made up of Bishop Garrigan High School (named after the first bishop of the Catholic Diocese of Sioux City) and Seton Elementary (named for St. Elizabeth Ann Seton).

== Infrastructure ==
=== Utilities ===
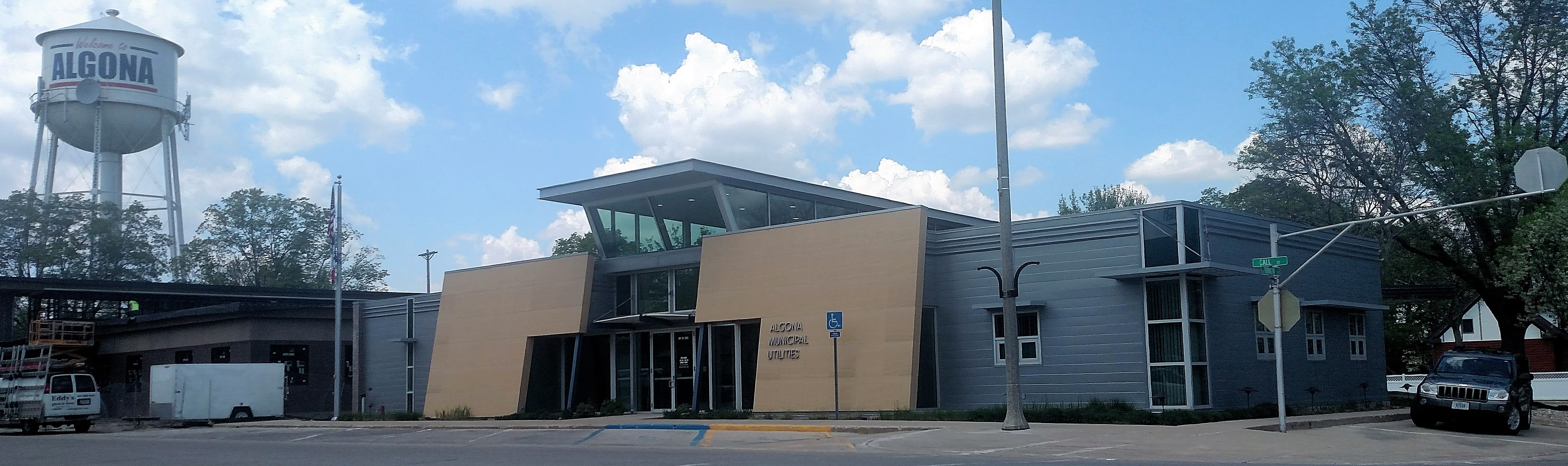
Municipal utilities building in Algona

Utilities are provided by the Algona Municipal Utilities, which is directed by a five-member board of trustees appointed by the mayor. Drinking water is pumped from the Buried Sand and Gravel-Dakota aquifer and treated before being distributed to customers. Wastewater is collected and treated, and billed based on water usage. Stormwater impact fees are flat rates based upon the customer type.

Electricity is produced at the George Neal Generating Plant in Sioux City, Iowa, Whelan Unit 2 near Hastings, Nebraska, and the Iowa Distributed Wind Generation Project southeast of Algona. AMU is also a member of North Iowa Municipal Electric Cooperative Association. The AMU purchases power and distributes it to customers in Algona. AMU has also provided cable, internet, and phone service since 1997.

== Notable people ==
- Paul Bell, Iowa state representative
- Audi Crooks, basketball player
- Dick Dale, musician on The Lawrence Welk Show
- L. J. Dickinson, U.S. representative and U.S. senator from Iowa
- Steve Doocy, host of Fox & Friends
- Curt Hanson, Iowa state representative
- Mike Mercer, football player
- Brad Nelson, baseball player
- Mary Jane Odell, secretary of state of Iowa
- Elizabeth Bunnell Read, journalist and suffragist
- Paul Seiler, football player
- Eric Swalwell, U.S. representative from California
- J. L. Wilkinson, owner of the Kansas City Monarchs
