= Corwith, Iowa =

- City
- Location of Corwith, Iowa
- Coordinates: 42°59′20″N 93°57′29″W
- Country: USA
- State: Iowa
- County: Hancock

Area
  - Total: 1.45 sq mi (3.75 km^{2})
  - Land: 1.45 sq mi (3.75 km^{2})
  - Water: 0 sq mi (0.00 km^{2})
- Elevation: 1,175 ft (358 m)

Population (2020)
  - Total: 266
  - Density: 183.7/sq mi (70.91/km^{2})
- Time zone: UTC-6 (Central (CST))
  - Summer (DST): UTC-5 (CDT)
- ZIP code: 50430
- Area code: 515
- FIPS code: 19-16590
- GNIS feature ID: 2393641

Corwith is a city in Hancock County, Iowa, United States. The population was 266 at the time of the 2020 census.

== History ==
Corwith got its start in the year 1880, following construction of the Minneapolis & St. Louis Railroad through that territory. It burned down in the 1800s. The first buildings to be built were a hotel and the train depot.

== Geography ==
Corwith is located on the Boone River.

According to the United States Census Bureau, the city has a total area of 1.48 square miles (3.83 km^{2}), all land.

== Demographics ==
Historical populations
Year	Pop.	±%
1890	347	—
1900	651	+87.6%
1910	455	−30.1%
1920	635	+39.6%
1930	481	−24.3%
1940	481	+0.0%
1950	480	−0.2%
1960	488	+1.7%
1970	438	−10.2%
1980	480	+9.6%
1990	354	−26.2%
2000	350	−1.1%
2010	309	−11.7%
2020	266	−13.9%
Source:"U.S. Census website". United States Census Bureau. and Iowa Data Center; Source: U.S. Decennial Census

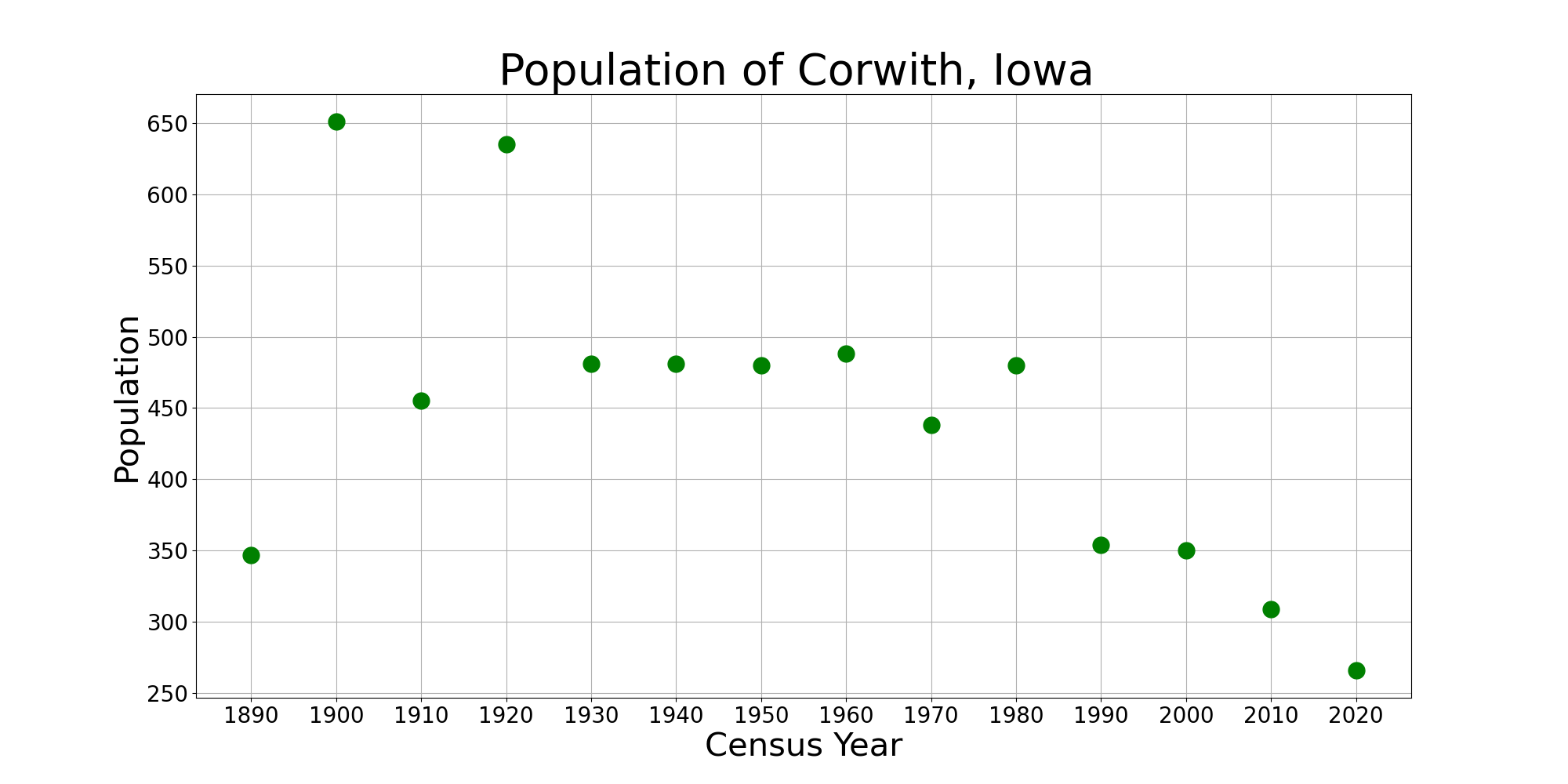
The population of Corwith, Iowa from US census data

=== 2020 census ===
As of the census of 2020, there were 266 people, 121 households, and 75 families residing in the city. The population density was 183.7 inhabitants per square mile (70.9/km^{2}). There were 147 housing units at an average density of 101.5 per square mile (39.2/km^{2}). The racial makeup of the city was 88.7% White, 1.5% Black or African American, 0.8% Native American, 0.0% Asian, 0.0% Pacific Islander, 3.4% from other races and 5.6% from two or more races. Hispanic or Latino persons of any race comprised 13.5% of the population.

Of the 121 households, 24.0% of which had children under the age of 18 living with them, 47.9% were married couples living together, 5.0% were cohabitating couples, 24.0% had a female householder with no spouse or partner present and 23.1% had a male householder with no spouse or partner present. 38.0% of all households were non-families. 30.6% of all households were made up of individuals, 9.1% had someone living alone who was 65 years old or older.

The median age in the city was 47.0 years. 20.7% of the residents were under the age of 20; 4.9% were between the ages of 20 and 24; 22.2% were from 25 and 44; 32.3% were from 45 and 64; and 19.9% were 65 years of age or older. The gender makeup of the city was 50.4% male and 49.6% female.

=== 2010 census ===
As of the census of 2010, there were 309 people, 141 households, and 78 families living in the city. The population density was 208.8 inhabitants per square mile (80.6/km^{2}). There were 167 housing units at an average density of 112.8 per square mile (43.6/km^{2}). The racial makeup of the city was 97.7% White, 0.3% Asian, 1.3% from other races, and 0.6% from two or more races. Hispanic or Latino of any race were 4.2% of the population.

There were 141 households, of which 22.0% had children under the age of 18 living with them, 46.1% were married couples living together, 7.1% had a female householder with no husband present, 2.1% had a male householder with no wife present, and 44.7% were non-families. 35.5% of all households were made up of individuals, and 19.9% had someone living alone who was 65 years of age or older. The average household size was 2.19 and the average family size was 2.85.

The median age in the city was 46.3 years. 20.1% of residents were under the age of 18; 6.8% were between the ages of 18 and 24; 20% were from 25 to 44; 31.4% were from 45 to 64; and 21.7% were 65 years of age or older. The gender makeup of the city was 51.8% male and 48.2% female.

=== 2000 census ===
As of the census of 2000, there were 350 people, 150 households, and 94 families living in the city. The population density was 224.2 inhabitants per square mile (86.6/km^{2}). There were 163 housing units at an average density of 104.4 per square mile (40.3/km^{2}). The racial makeup of the city was 96.57% White, 0.29% Native American, 3.14% from other races. Hispanic or Latino of any race were 6.57% of the population.

There were 150 households, out of which 28.7% had children under the age of 18 living with them, 51.3% were married couples living together, 7.3% had a female householder with no husband present, and 37.3% were non-families. 34.0% of all households were made up of individuals, and 19.3% had someone living alone who was 65 years of age or older. The average household size was 2.33 and the average family size was 2.97.

In the city, the population was spread out, with 25.7% under the age of 18, 5.1% from 18 to 24, 24.6% from 25 to 44, 22.6% from 45 to 64, and 22.0% who were 65 years of age or older. The median age was 40 years. For every 100 females, there were 94.4 males. For every 100 females age 18 and over, there were 88.4 males.

The median income for a household in the city was $27,222, and the median income for a family was $38,333. Males had a median income of $32,031 versus $16,528 for females. The per capita income for the city was $13,054. About 9.8% of families and 11.4% of the population were below the poverty line, including 10.1% of those under age 18 and 8.2% of those age 65 or over.

== Education ==
Algona Community School District is the area school district.

Corwith–Wesley Community School District served the community until it dissolved on July 1, 2015. That district operated Corwith–Wesley–Lu Verne High School. The demolition of the former Corwith school was anticipated for 2016. Later, Lu Verne Community School District became the community. Since 2015, Lu Verne sendt its secondary students to Algona CSD, which operates Algona Middle School and Algona High School. In 2023, Lu Verne CSD merged into Algona CSD.

== Notable people ==
- E. Thurman Gaskill, Assistant Majority Leader in the Iowa Senate
- Sue Mullins, Iowa farmer and state legislator
