= Algona Community School District =

Public school district in Algona, Iowa, United States

Coordinates: 43.063121°N 94.223904°W

Location
- Algona, Iowa Kossuth, Hancock, Humboldt, and Winnebago counties United States
- Coordinates: 43.063121, -94.223904

District information
- Type: Local school district
- Grades: K–12
- Established: Before 2001
- Superintendent: Joe Carter
- Schools: 5
- Budget: $22,931,000 (2020-21)
- NCES District ID: 1903360

Students and staff
- Students: 1592 (2022-23)
- Teachers: 99.58 FTE
- Staff: 131.19 FTE
- Student–teacher ratio: 15.99
- Athletic conference: North Central
- District mascot: Bulldogs
- Colors: Red and Black

Other information
- Website: www.algona.k12.ia.us

Algona Community School District is a rural public school district headquartered in Algona, Iowa.

The district, mostly in Kossuth County, has small sections in Hancock, Humboldt, and Winnebago counties. It serves Algona, Burt, Corwith, Lu Verne, Titonka, Wesley, and Whittemore.

== History ==
On July 1, 2001, the Burt Community School District consolidated into the Algona district. On July 1, 2014, the Titonka Consolidated School District consolidated into the Algona district. The Algona district, which took control of the Titonka school building, was scheduled to sell it to the Titonka city government on January 12, 2015. On July 1, 2015, the Corwith–Wesley Community School District dissolved, with a portion of the district being reassigned to the Algona district. Most of Corwith–Wesley's secondary students were scheduled to go to Algona schools.

Starting in 2015, the Lu Verne Community School District began to send its secondary students to Algona schools as part of a new grade-sharing arrangement.

In September 2022, voters in Lu Verne CSD approved being taken over by Algona CSD, with 121 in favor and 45 against; additionally, voters in Algona CSD voted to take in Lu Verne CSD with 349 in favor and 9 against.

On July 1, 2023, Lu Verne CSD merged into Algona CSD.

== Schools ==
The district operates five schools, all in Algona:

- Algona High School
- Algona Middle School
- Bryant Elementary School
- Bertha Godfrey Elementary School
- Lucia Wallace Elementary School

== See also ==
- List of school districts in Iowa
