= Auditorium Building =

Building in Chicago, Illinois

- U.S. National Register of Historic Places
- U.S. National Historic Landmark
- Chicago Landmark
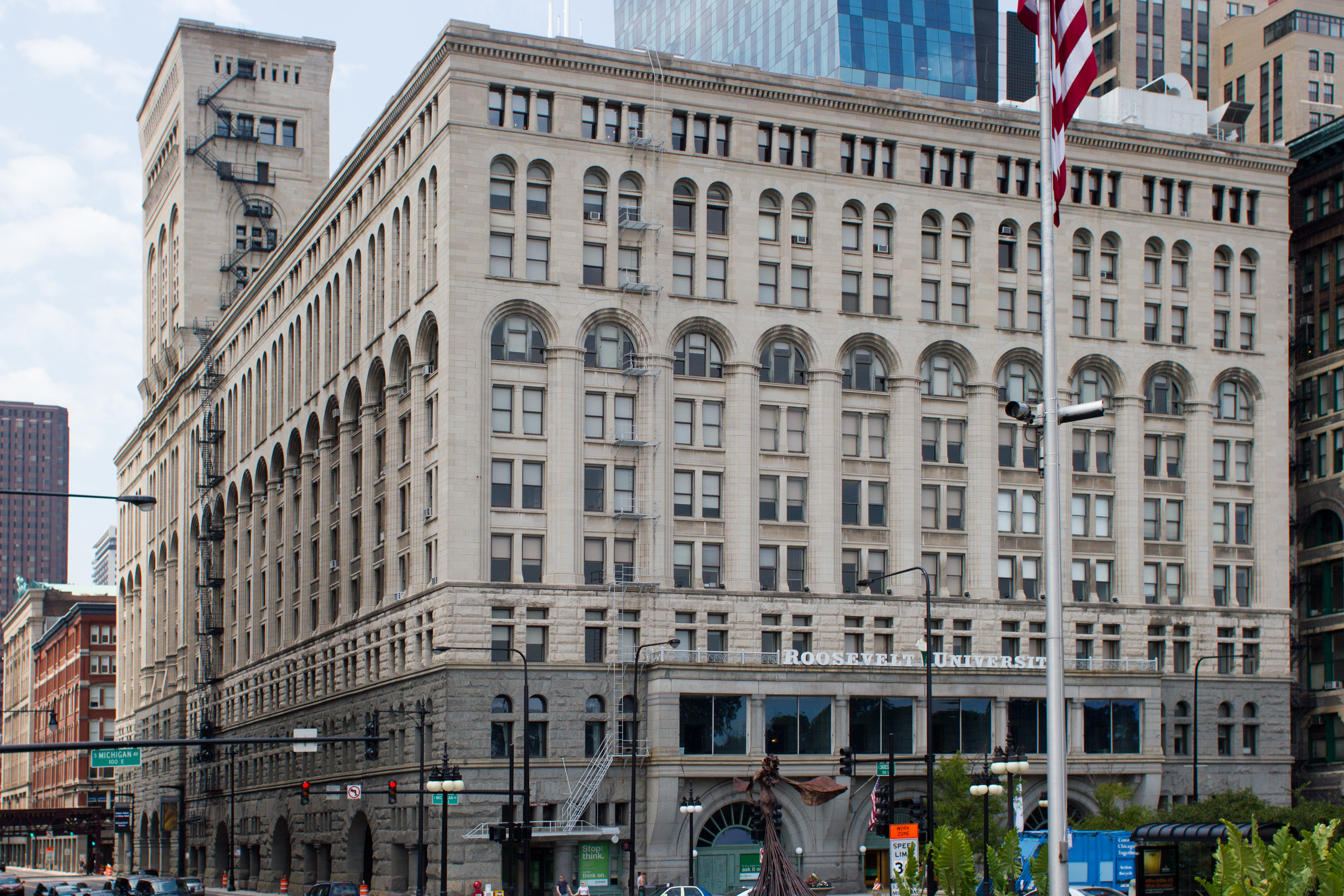
- The Michigan Avenue facade seen in 2012

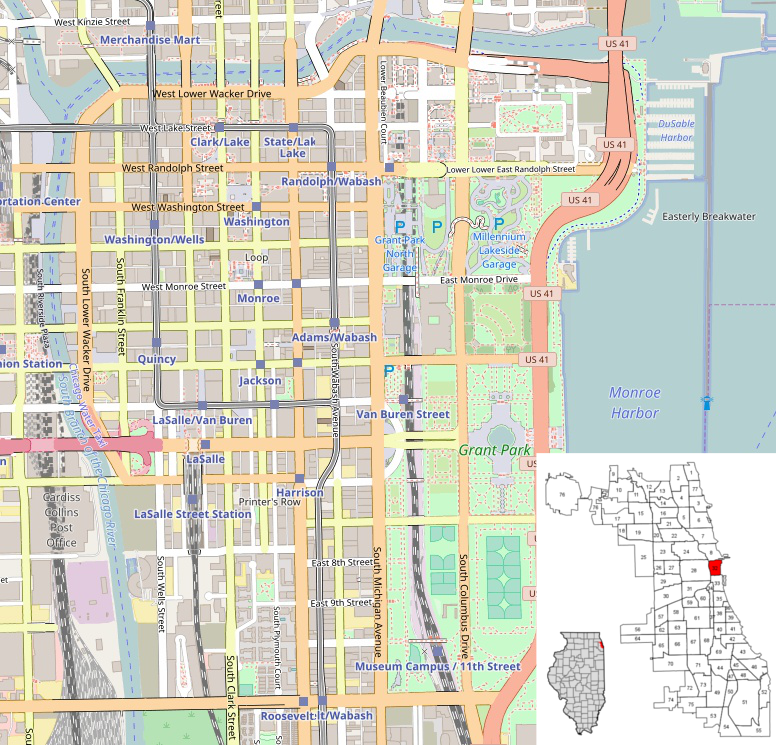
- Location within Chicago Loop Location within Chicago metropolitan area Location within Illinois Location within the United States
- Interactive map of Auditorium Building
- Location: 430 S. Michigan Ave. Chicago, Illinois, US
- Coordinates: 41°52′34″N 87°37′31″W
- Area: 63,500 square feet (5,899 m^{2})
- Built: 1889
- Architects: Adler & Sullivan (Dankmar Adler, Louis Sullivan, George Grant Elmslie, Frank Lloyd Wright)
- Architectural style: Late-19th- and early-20th-century American movements
- Part of: Historic Michigan Boulevard District
- NRHP reference No.: 70000230

Significant dates
- Added to NRHP: April 17, 1970
- Designated NHL: May 15, 1975
- Designated CHICL: September 15, 1976

The Auditorium Building is a mixed-use early skyscraper at 430 South Michigan Avenue in the Loop community area of Chicago, Illinois, United States. Built between 1887 and 1889, it was designed by Adler & Sullivan, the partnership of Louis Sullivan and Dankmar Adler. The building occupies the northern side of Ida B. Wells Drive between Michigan and Wabash avenues. It originally included the Auditorium Theatre, offices, and a hotel; the theater still exists, but the rest of the building has since been converted into classrooms for Roosevelt University. The building is a Chicago Landmark and a National Historic Landmark, and it is listed on the National Register of Historic Places.

Following the success of the 1885 Grand Opera Festival, Chicago businessman Ferdinand Peck formed a syndicate to develop a theater, office, and hotel building. The building was dedicated on December 9, 1889, and the hotel opened the next year. Originally, the Chicago Auditorium Association (CAA) owned the building, and ownership of the land was split three ways. The CAA began looking to replace the building as early as 1922; it subsequently went bankrupt, and the landowners took over in 1932. The building was renovated but was closed in 1941. It was briefly used as a servicemen's center during World War II before being taken over by Roosevelt University in 1946. The university converted the former offices and hotel into classrooms, and the theater inside was renovated between 1958 and 1967. The building has undergone additional modifications throughout the years, including renovations in the early 2000s.

The building is generally 10 stories high, except for a 17-story, 240-foot-tall (73 m) tower to the south. The facade is generally made of darker granite and lighter limestone and is divided into three horizontal sections. Its structural design includes a foundation of grillages and pyramidal footings, along with an iron and steel superstructure. Inside, the theater occupies 40% of the building's volume, with 4,200 seats spread across three seating levels. Surrounding the theater is classroom space formerly used by the hotel to the east and the offices to the west.

== Site ==
The Auditorium Building is located at 430 South Michigan Avenue in the Loop community area of Chicago, Illinois, United States. It occupies a land lot covering 63,500 square feet (5,900 m^{2}) on the southern section of its city block. The block is bounded by Van Buren Street to the north, Wabash Avenue to the west, Ida B. Wells Drive (formerly Congress Parkway) to the south, and Michigan Avenue to the east.

The building has a frontage of about 160 feet (49 m) on Wabash, 360 feet (110 m) on Ida B. Wells, and 187 feet (57 m) on Michigan. On the same block to the north are the Fine Arts Building and the Buckingham Building on Michigan Avenue. Grant Park is to the east across Michigan Avenue, and the Congress Plaza Hotel is to the south across Ida B. Wells Drive. An alley just north of the Auditorium Building is known as Song Bird Alley or Peacock Alley.

== History ==
=== Development ===
==== Origin and purpose ====
Chicago's remaining theaters after the 1871 fire either were small, were inconveniently located, or had poor acoustics. Chicago businessman Ferdinand Peck helped finance construction of Chicago's Central Music Hall, which opened in 1879 and was designed by Dankmar Adler. Shortly afterward, Adler hired Louis Sullivan, who eventually became a partner in their architectural practice, Adler & Sullivan. As a direct result of the Music Hall commission, they were hired to design several auditoriums across the midwestern US. These included a temporary theater for the Grand Opera Festival in Chicago, hosted by the Opera Festival Association, an organization formed by Peck. The Opera Festival ran for two weeks in April 1885, attracting up to 115,000 attendees. The success of the Opera Festival prompted Peck to build a permanent opera house in Chicago.

At the Opera Festival Association's annual meeting in May 1885, the group created a committee to obtain land for a new theater building. Peck sought a site on Michigan Avenue's west sidewalk, and to save money, he initially considered developing on a publicly owned site. To offset the theater's operating losses, Peck proposed constructing hotel rooms around it, catering to the area's high demand for hospitality. Historian Joseph Siry writes that the early plans did not mention offices, of which relatively few had been developed along downtown Chicago's eastern edge.

By late 1885, Peck had proposed a public–private partnership with the Chicago Public Library to develop a combination theater–library at Michigan Avenue and Randolph Street. After receiving pushback, Peck dropped his suggestion in favor of a fully privately funded theater. Another site fronting Lake Michigan was dismissed, and Peck also reportedly considered sites on Michigan Avenue at Congress or Monroe streets. By January 1886, the Peck syndicate contemplated obtaining the northwest corner of Michigan Avenue and Congress Street, where six owners possessed 11 land lots. Peck's friend Wirt D. Walker bought an option for the lots, extending west to Wabash Avenue, from the Scammon estate that March. After obtaining full ownership, Walker gave Peck a sixty-day option on the land that June. Walker did not yet own the block's southwestern corner, which was occupied by the Brunswick Hotel and some houses. The city government had also set aside part of the block for a future north–south alley, though this land was later given to Peck's syndicate.

==== Incorporation, funding, and design ====
After acquiring the land, Peck immediately announced plans for a hotel, office, and theater building. Illinois law at the time forbade the creation of corporations solely for real estate development. Accordingly, Peck and his partners incorporated the Chicago Grand Auditorium Association (CGAA) that July to both develop the building and operate the theater. By then, Walker, the Peck family, and Studebaker Bros. had consolidated ownership of the site, which had been merged into five lots. Adler & Sullivan had drawn their first known plan for the site by August 1886, although they had not been hired yet. Sullivan's first design, published the next month, called for a Romanesque structure with a brick, stone, and terracotta facade, along with a central tower and a high pitched roof. The ornate facade was intended to draw the attention of passengers riding trains along the nearby waterfront.

Meanwhile, the CGAA sold $2 million of stock and issued $900,000 in bonds. (Note: Equivalent to $63.2 million of stock and $28.5 million of bonds in 2025) The stock sales funded only construction, not any of the theater's operating expenses, and stockholders were not given any incentives such as box seats. An initial tranche of stock worth $750,000 was issued in November 1886 at $100 per share. (Note: The initial tranche is equivalent to $23.7 million, and each share equivalent to $3,200, in 2025) Early shareholders included Marshall Field, the Chicago City Railway, Martin A. Ryerson, Charles L. Hutchinson, and N. K. Fairbank, along with Adler & Sullivan and Peck. The CGAA selected a board of directors on December 4; before the board's first meeting the next week, Sullivan sent the stockholders revised plans. By then, Peck envisioned a 5,000-seat theater with a massive stage, two gallery levels, and 51 boxes. Following agitation among directors who opposed Adler & Sullivan's appointment, Sullivan drew up a compromise plan, which called for a 10-story, flat-roofed structure with a pyramidal-roofed tower. Peck proposed that a third-party expert review Sullivan's plans, inviting Sullivan's former teacher William Ware to examine them.

Elevation drawing from a revised plan, completed in March 1887

The CGAA hired Adler & Sullivan on December 22, 1886, before Ware had reviewed the plans. The next month, the corporation increased its capital stock to $1.5 million (Note: Equivalent to $47.4 million in 2025) and renamed itself the Chicago Auditorium Association (CAA). Adler & Sullivan draftsman Paul Mueller said that, by then, Sullivan had devised drawings for an elaborate terracotta building with bay windows and second-story columns. Ware visited Chicago on January 17, 1887, and suggested minor changes to the exterior, particularly to the tower and the facade's horizontal subdivisions. Following Ware's visit, the CAA's directors directed Adler & Sullivan to complete exterior drawings on January 29. The corporation signed 99-year leases for the site, finalizing agreements with the landowners in January and February. Fifteen draftsmen spent half a year devising the detailed drawings. The design was repeatedly revised during early 1887, much to Adler's dismay; on several occasions, draftsmen completed drawings only to find that the CAA's needs had changed yet again. Frank Lloyd Wright, who joined Adler & Sullivan that year, helped work on the design.

==== Construction ====
The CAA began soliciting bids for the foundation on January 17, the day Ware visited, and work had begun by the end of the month. Most of the site was cleared the first week of February, and later that month William Sooy Smith conducted test borings to ascertain how much weight the ground could carry. Two hundred workers and thirty horse teams worked continuously on foundations, demolishing the existing buildings while foundation work proceeded concurrently on other, already-cleared parts of the site. In the meantime, the CAA awarded dozens of contracts for the project; this contrasted with newer buildings where work was handled by a single general contractor. The Brunswick Hotel was demolished after its lease expired on May 1, and the CAA's directors voted on May 6 to use limestone, rather than brick and terracotta, above the second floor. Later that month, the foundation was completed, and the CAA and architects agreed to use rose-tinted Minnesota gray granite for the lower facade. A construction permit for the superstructure was issued on June 25, and foundation work was finished that July.

Workers used temporary falsework to support steel and iron girders until the permanent walls and columns were completed. Because of the project's high rate of accidents, contractors took out life insurance policies and distributed disability benefits to injured workers. Adler also modified the theater's design to accommodate a theatrical organ. Peck invited US President Grover Cleveland to lay the building's cornerstone; this drew complaints from labor unions, as Cleveland was not a union worker, and he ultimately refused to lay the cornerstone. Instead Cleveland visited the site on October 5, 1887, and the cornerstone was laid the next day. Concurrently, Chicago businesspeople wanted the city to host the Democratic National Convention (DNC) and Republican National Convention (RNC) in 1888, even as labor unions encouraged the DNC and RNC to boycott the Auditorium Building. While the 1888 DNC was ultimately held in St. Louis, the Auditorium Building was selected for the 1888 RNC in December 1887. Granite cutters went on strike that month after making very little progress on the facade. By then, brickwork and ironwork were being installed, and trusses over the theater were being added.

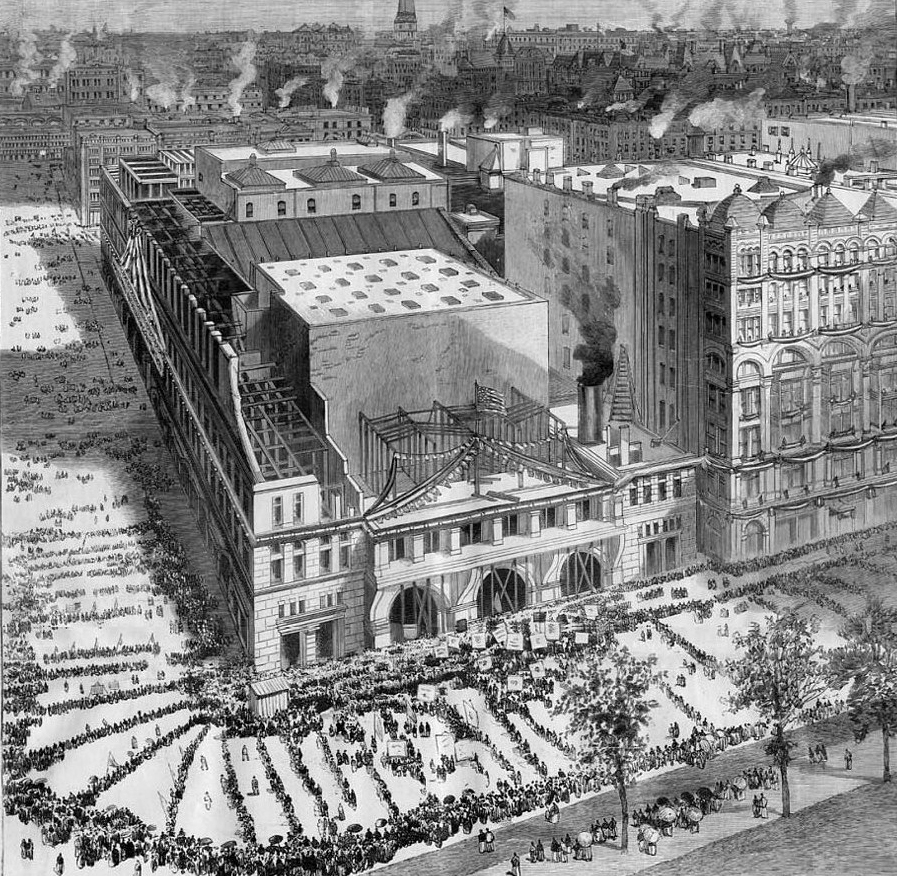
Under construction, 1888

Work on the theater was hastened for the RNC, even as the building around it was delayed. The CAA took over the granite supplier's Minnesota quarry in January 1888. After finding that the quarry could not supply large enough blocks for some columns, Adler & Sullivan ordered granite from Maine. Three-fourths of the iron had been delivered by March, but the steel supplier had difficulty keeping up with demand. The planned tower was also increased to 17 stories mid-construction. The theater was being roofed in by early 1888, and facade work had reached the fifth floor by June. That month, Milward Adams was selected to manage the theater. Temporary lighting and thousands of temporary seats were installed for the RNC, where Benjamin Harrison was nominated as the Republican presidential candidate.

The CAA hired Frank Roosevelt in August 1888 to produce the theater's organ. Construction of the offices was accelerated, as the CAA wished to begin renting out offices in May 1889. Additional contracts, such as those for plasterwork and ornamentation, were awarded through 1888 and 1889. By December 1888, the shareholders had rented out some of the offices, and interior finishes were being installed. By then, rising costs prompted the CAA to issue additional bonds. Shortly thereafter, while digging the theater's stage pit, workers began to detect settlement under the building.

==== Completion and opening ====
With work nearing completion, the CAA began looking for a hotel operator in October 1888; given the low expected annual income of $50,000, (Note: Equivalent to $1.6 million in 2025) they had difficulty convincing a local hotelier to operate the hotel. J. H. Breslin and R. H. Southgate, who respectively operated the Gilsey House and the Brunswick Hotel in New York, agreed to operate it in early 1889. A new entity, the Auditorium Hotel Company, was incorporated. Breslin and Southgate wanted the hotel to also include a banquet hall, which Adler hastily added to the seventh floor above the theater. Breslin and Southgate originally owned five-sixths of the hotel, but Charles W. Shepard, who owned the remaining one-sixth, sold them his ownership stake that August. The tower's masonry was finished in June 1889, and a capstone dedication ceremony was held that October 2. Just before the building's formal opening that December, the CAA increased its capital stock to $2 million. (Note: Equivalent to $64.8 million in 2025)

The Auditorium Building was dedicated on December 9, 1889, with an audience of 5,000 inside and 10,000 outside. President Harrison dedicated the building and opera star Adelina Patti sang "Home Sweet Home". The theater's first performance, Gounod's Roméo et Juliette, was staged the next night. The hotel was still under construction; due to delays completing the finishes, the hotel's dining room was not used until January 1890. The hotel officially opened on March 15, and the banquet hall opened that October. In total, the building had cost over $3 million. (Note: Equivalent to $97.2 million in 2025) (Note: Various other figures have been given, with inflation figures: $3,145,291 (equivalent to $100.5 million in 2025); $3.4 million (equivalent to $110.2 million in 2025); $3.5 million (equivalent to $113.4 million in 2025)) For their work, Adler & Sullivan earned $75,000 in cash and stock—representing a 2.5% commission, which barely covered their expenses. Adler & Sullivan were also offered some office space at reduced rental rates.

=== Early years ===
For its first several decades, the building hosted various events and political conventions. The 400-room Auditorium Hotel was larger than many of its nearby competitors. The hotel hosted several US presidents, along with several Republican Party candidates' presidential campaigns. The theater hosted opera singers such as Enrico Caruso, Amelita Galli-Curci, Mary Garden, John McCormack, Nellie Melba, and Ellen Terry, presenting up to 38 operas per year. It was also used for ballet, orchestra, and concerts. The CAA was less profitable: It only ever issued one dividend to stockholders over the years.

==== 1890s to 1910s ====
The Congress Parkway (Ida B. Wells Drive) facade, seen from Michigan Avenue

In July 1891, the CAA extended its land leases by 100 years. At the time, Henry J. Willing owned most of the land; Francis Bartlett and William A. Slater owned the southwest corner, while Studebaker owned the northeast corner. The building's walls had settled 6 inches (150 mm) by then. The Chicago Symphony Orchestra began performing at the theater that October, and Adler & Sullivan also opened their office on the tower's top floors; by then, the offices were 75% occupied. The hotel was less profitable, in part because the guestrooms lacked en-suite bathrooms, a feature common in newer hotels. The CAA issued another $1.6 million of bonds in 1892 to fund the building's continued operation. After William Fitzgerald proposed erecting another hotel across Congress Street in 1892, the CAA bought Fitzgerald's land to avert prospective competition. The CAA developed the Auditorium Annex (later Congress Hotel) there the next year, constructing an adjacent power plant that served both the original building and the annex. This freed up additional basement space for rental purposes.

The Auditorium Hotel and Annex accommodated large numbers of guests during the 1893 World's Columbian Exposition, after which the CAA's directors issued their dividend. By the late 1890s, the theater's walls had been repainted, as they contrasted with the colors of female patrons' gowns. The Auditorium Building also became unprofitable after the exposition, prompting Peck's resignation from the board of directors in 1900. The building's outer walls had continued to settle, and that year Adler asked Mueller about whether the interior columns could be shortened to even out the floor levels. This was never carried out, as Adler died that year. For fire safety, fire escapes were added in 1901, and firewalls were added after the Iroquois Theatre fire two years later. In part because of the Auditorium's inadequate facilities, the Symphony Orchestra relocated to Orchestra Hall in 1904. Although the theater continued hosting traveling acts and political speeches, the building was losing convention business to the significantly larger Chicago Coliseum.

In 1906, Sullivan drew up plans to replace the theater with more hotel rooms, expanding the Auditorium Building to 20 or 22 stories, but nothing came of this proposal. The CAA took over the hotel's operation from the previous owners in March 1909, following the expiry of the previous lease. Subsequently, Benjamin Marshall renovated the hotel's Michigan Avenue guestrooms and basement in 1910 and drew up plans for ground-floor renovations, which were not carried out. That year, after the Chicago Grand Opera Company became the Auditorium Theatre's resident opera company, Marshall renovated the theater, adding boxes and raising the stage floor. Despite the hotel and theater renovations, the building's financials remained stagnant; any savings were counteracted by depreciation and sharply increased property taxes. The scale of the losses was not made evident until 1918, when the CAA's balance sheets began recording depreciation charges.

==== 1920s and 1930s ====
The Auditorium Hotel opened its first store, an apparel shop, in 1922. By the following year, the CAA planned to demolish and replace the Auditorium Building, citing its continued unprofitability. As the terms of the existing ground leases forbade demolition, the CAA sued the landowners in February 1923 to change the lease terms, but Peck and the landowners opposed demolition. The CAA claimed the building was about to collapse, in an unsuccessful attempt to have courts rule in their favor. A judicial decision was deferred for several years, and the US Supreme Court ultimately declined to hear the case in October 1928. The demolition plans were thus abandoned. That year, a syndicate of Chicago businessmen took a controlling interest in the CAA.

The Grand Opera Company moved to the Civic Opera House in 1929, performing its final show at the Auditorium Theatre that January. One of the CAA's bond issues matured the next month, but the association was unable to pay the face value of $834,000 to bondholders. (Note: Equivalent to $12.3 million in 2025) The Auditorium Theatre subsequently closed, and the CAA declared bankruptcy. The CAA's receiver proposed converting the theater to a miniature golf course. The receiver attempted to convince the building's shareholders to move their shares in a common fund, but although most shareholders agreed to do so, this did not raise sufficient money for the organization. The four landowners—Northwestern Mutual and the Willing, Sears, and Slater estates—solicited bids for the building's demolition in 1930 and 1931. The lowest demolition bid was submitted for $400,000, (Note: Equivalent to $6.8 million in 2025) more than the land valuation.

In 1932, the landowners took ownership of the building and created a syndicate, the Auditorium Building Corporation, to manage it. John Goodridge of the Willing estate led the syndicate. Northwestern Mutual declined to join, requiring the remaining landowners to seek the company's permission for any modifications under its section of land. The owners hired Holabird & Root to conduct renovations. The firm repaired the tower's foundations and the theater's ceiling trusses, and it redecorated the hotel to accommodate visitors to the Century of Progress world's fair. The theater renovation cost $125,000 (Note: Equivalent to $2.4 million in 2025) and involved the installation of new boxes and an entrance canopy, replacement of lighting, repainting, and removal of an art-glass skylight. The theater reopened in December 1932, but its success was short-lived. By the late 1930s, the building had a net annual income of only $35,000, (Note: Equivalent to $0.6 million in 2025) while the property taxes alone were double that amount. Nonetheless, Holabird & Root deemed the building itself structurally sound, and the theater was still hosting events.

==== 1940s: Closure and servicemen's center ====
Michigan facade, seen from Grant Park

The Auditorium Building Corporation had accumulated $1.15 million in debt by 1940 (Note: Equivalent to $20.7 million in 2025) and was severely delinquent on its property taxes. The corporation announced in May 1941 that the building would close the next month, after the nearby Congress Hotel decided to stop providing heat, power, and water to the Auditorium; the corporation lacked money to pay for its own utility plant. In response, local civic groups convened to appoint a committee to advocate for city takeover of the building, and Mayor Edward Joseph Kelly chartered the Auditorium Music Foundation to convert it into a music center. After a 30-day extension of utility service, the Auditorium Building was shuttered entirely on July 31, 1941. All tenants moved away except for a few store owners.

The Auditorium Music Foundation sought to raise $400,000 to convert the theater into a performance venue. (Note: Equivalent to $6.7 million in 2025) The group wanted to reopen the theater by November 1941, but it had raised only $250,000 within a year. (Note: Equivalent to $3.9 million in 2025) The Cook County government filed a foreclosure suit against the building in June 1942, intending to auction off the decorations and furnishings. The county had wanted to auction the entire building, but Northwestern Mutual had paid the back taxes for its own site, preventing such an auction. The county government approved takeover of the building later that month, and the furnishings were sold as scheduled. The city government obtained ownership of the other lots, taking over the structure in July. Excluded from this acquisition was a 52-by-170-foot (16 by 52 m) parcel at the building's northeast corner, covering parts of the theater and half the hotel.

The building became a World War II servicemen's center, occupying the first two stories. A bowling alley was added inside the theater, a lunch counter replaced the original bar, and the decorations were painted over. A temporary boiler plant was added as well, and a music room was built on the fourth floor in 1943. The northeast corner parcel was sold in 1945 to attorney Abraham Teitelbaum. Teitelbaum proposed buying the building early the next year. Kelly also proposed that the building be permanently retained as a recreation center, but ultimately the servicemen's center operated for only a short period over the war. The center closed in May 1946 after accommodating ten million soldiers.

=== Roosevelt University ownership ===
==== Mid-1940s and 1950s ====
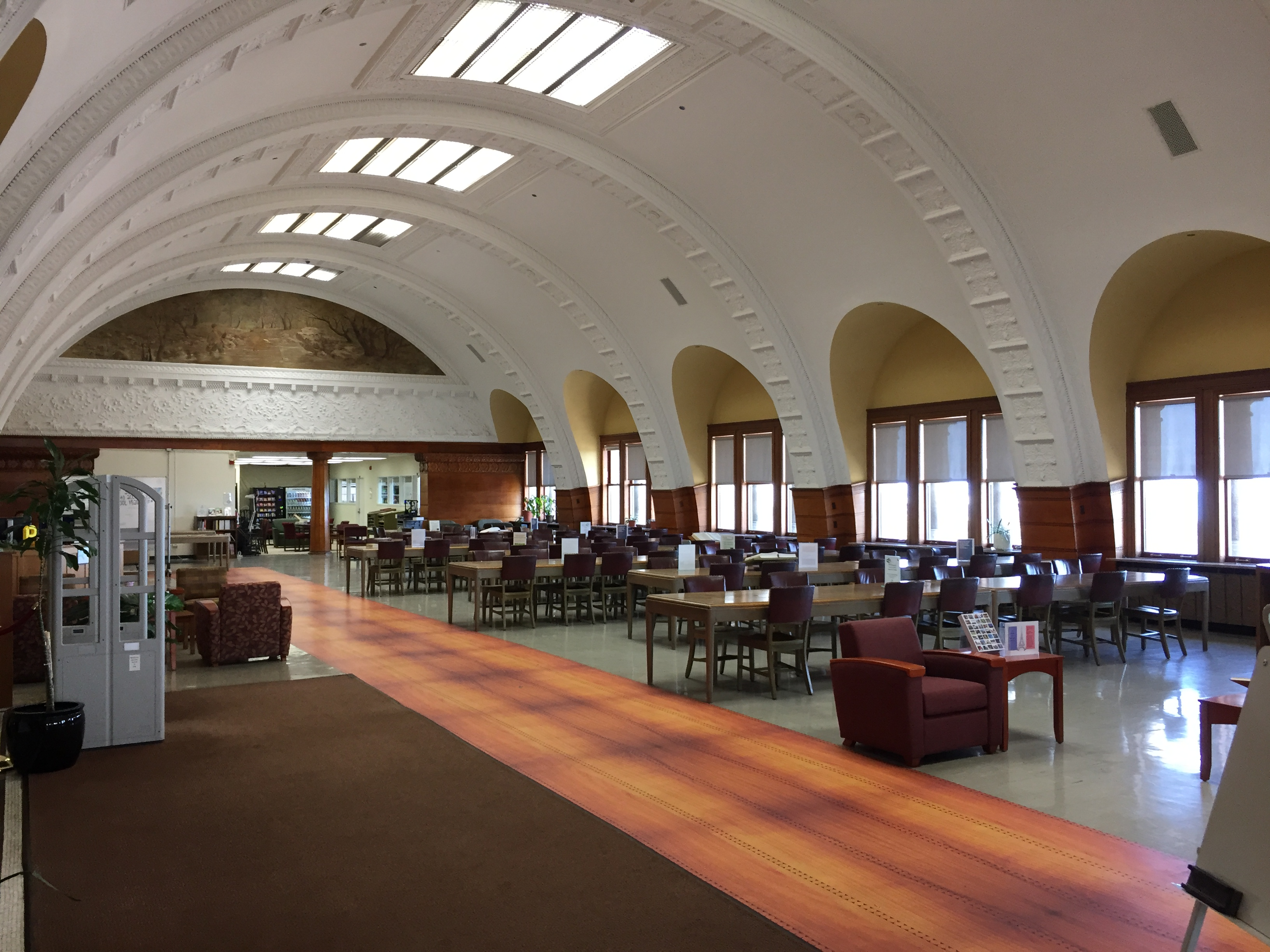
Roosevelt University's Murray-Green Library on the 10th floor of the Auditorium Building

Roosevelt University bought most of the building in August 1946, paying the Willing, Sears, and Slater estates $400,000. (Note: Equivalent to $5.0 million in 2025) (Note: Including the later $402,000 acquisition of Teitelbaum's land, the site cost has been cited at $800,000.) In exchange, the university assumed $1.3 million in back taxes. (Note: Equivalent to $16.3 million in 2025) The university took over the next month and renovated the former hotel space over the next several months. The Auditorium Theater Foundation repaid its creditors and dissolved that year; the theater stood vacant for another two decades and was used for storage. Ownership was still split with Teitelbaum, requiring each owner to gain the other's consent to use parts of the building. Some elements, such as the theater curtain, a heating plant, and elevator machinery, straddled both sections. Teitelbaum initially wanted $2 million, (Note: Equivalent to $25.1 million in 2025) a price the college found exorbitant; he then erected chicken-wire fence between the two portions of the building. He ultimately sold his land to the college in February 1947 for $402,000, (Note: Equivalent to $5.0 million in 2025) and students began using the Auditorium Building that year. The former hotel's lobby, lounge, and dining room respectively became the university's lobby, lounge, and library.

In 1950, the city government announced plans to widen the neighboring section of Congress Street into Congress Parkway. Roosevelt University contemplated converting the theater into a production studio around that time. As part of the Congress widening project, Roosevelt University agreed to cede a section of the first floor to the city in 1952, in exchange for having all back taxes waived. Some ground-floor rooms and part of the theater lobby were removed to make way for a sidewalk arcade; the Chicago Daily Tribune called these demolitions "a great pity". The arcade, built by Walsh Brothers for $337,999, (Note: Equivalent to $3.1 million in 2025) was completed in 1956. During the decade, as the building's stained-glass windows fell into disrepair, they were replaced with clear panes. The 17-story office tower had been closed off because of structural deterioration, and the university unsuccessfully sought an external organization to restore the theater. Wright, who supported the building's preservation, called the theater's dilapidated condition "Chicago's shame and a universal disgrace" and offered to help with renovation.

The university announced plans in 1955 to convert the banquet hall into Ganz Recital Hall. Interest in Sullivan's architecture was renewed during his 100th birthday in 1956. By then, Roosevelt University was giving twice-weekly tours of the building and was looking to rent out its space, including the theater, for up to $200,000 annually. (Note: Equivalent to $1.8 million in 2025) The university contemplated restoring the theater for the Chicago Symphony Orchestra, commencing tours of the space in late 1956. At the time, few of Chicago's other large theaters remained operational. The university also raised $75,000 to renovate Ganz Recital Hall; (Note: Equivalent to $0.7 million in 2025) architect Crombie Taylor was hired to design Ganz Hall's renovation, which was completed in 1957. The next year, Roosevelt University trustees passed a resolution to restore the exterior, theater, and other major interior spaces to their original appearances, and reuse or modernize other interiors. The trustees also appointed a committee to study a $2.7 million renovation for the theater. (Note: Equivalent to $23.1 million in 2025) Also in 1958, Taylor converted the ladies' parlor into the Louis Sullivan Room, following a $50,000 gift from urban planner Morris Hirsch. (Note: Equivalent to $0.4 million in 2025)

==== 1960s and 1970s: Renovations ====
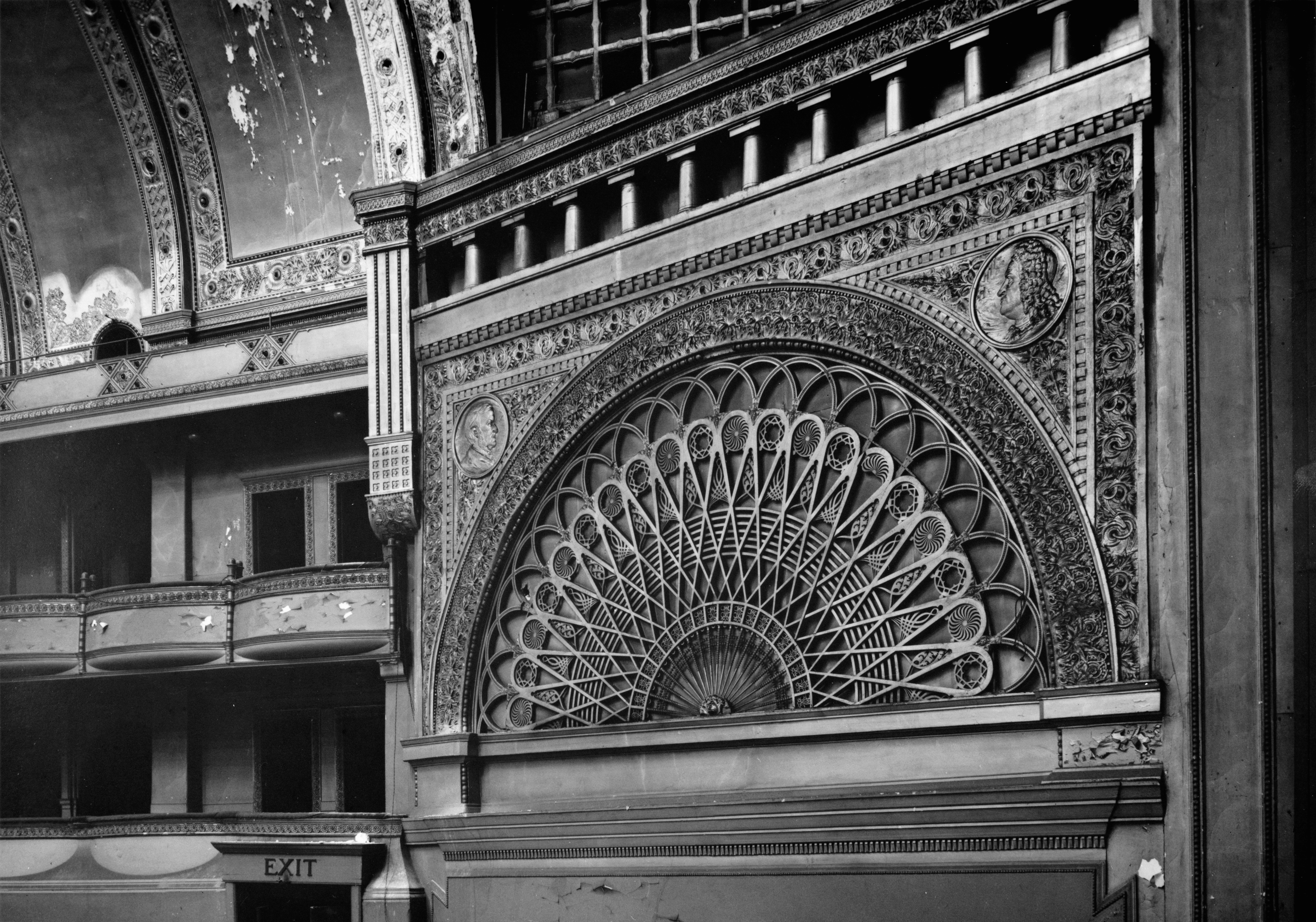
Damaged decorations in the Auditorium Theatre prior to renovation

The Auditorium Theater Council (ATC) was formed in 1960 to oversee the theater's renovation, though Roosevelt University retained ownership of the physical theater. The ATC was allowed to use the theater rent-free but could not borrow money to pay for the project. Beatrice T. Spachner, a Roosevelt University trustee, headed the ATC. (Note: Sources disagree on whether Spachner began her efforts in 1960, 1961, or 1963.) Encouraged by then-recent preservation efforts at New York's Carnegie Hall, the ATC hired Taylor and Skidmore, Owings & Merrill (SOM) as design consultants in 1961. SOM claimed the building was structurally unsound and that it would cost $4.25 million to renovate the building. (Note: Equivalent to $35.0 million in 2025) The damage was subsequently deemed to not be severe. Even so, Taylor said that defective drainage caused rainwater to pour onto the stage. Taylor oversaw an additional renovation of the second-floor hotel lounge in 1962. The next year, Roosevelt University contemplated a 20-story annex abutting the Auditorium Building, and the university spent a year remodeling the Wabash Avenue storefronts into a bookstore.

Harry Weese was hired to restore the theater, having offered to refurbish it at a price much lower than what SOM was offering. Work on the stage was underway by early 1964 after the ATC had raised $762,000 and received a permit to renovate the stage. (Note: Equivalent to $6.0 million in 2025) Fundraising was complicated by competition from the newly completed McCormick Place, which also had a theater. After over $1.7 million had been raised by 1966, (Note: Equivalent to $12.9 million in 2025) work on the theater stalled, prompting an emergency fundraising effort that November. The ATC had raised another half-million dollars by June 1967, bringing its total budget to $2.25 million, (Note: Equivalent to $16.6 million in 2025) enough to reopen the theater. (Note: Sources disagree on whether $2.25 million was the final cost or whether the renovation cost $3 million (equivalent to $22.1 million in 2025).) By the next month, Roosevelt University had raised $6.4 million for a separate renovation of the building, (Note: Equivalent to $48.4 million in 2025) which included restoring the office tower and adding interior floor area to the central rooftop courtyard.

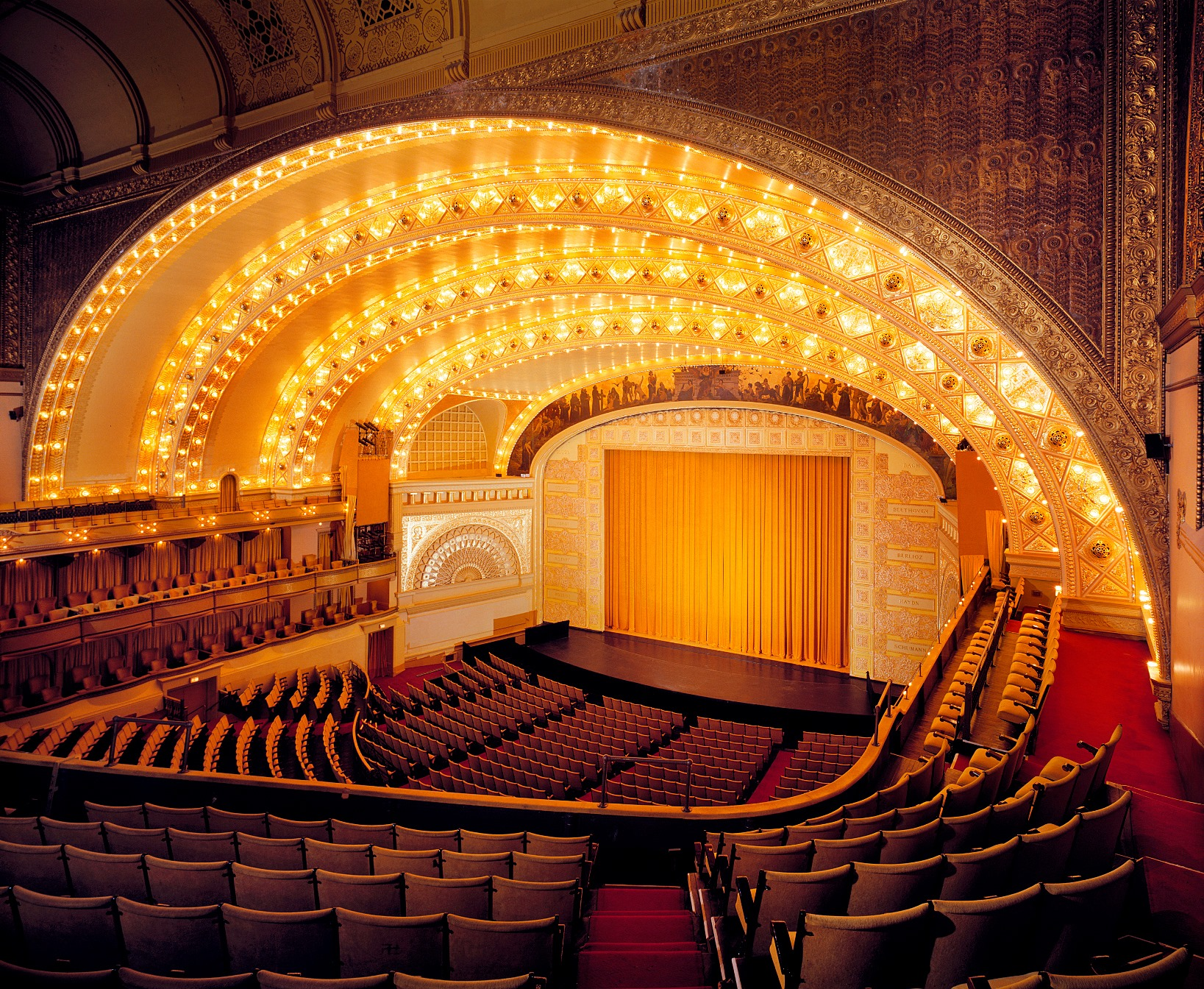
The Auditorium Theatre reopened in 1967.

On October 31, 1967, the ATC reopened the Auditorium Theatre with a performance of A Midsummer Night's Dream, proceeds from which were used for further renovations. By then, Roosevelt University was renovating the tower and courtyard, and it was adding a mezzanine within one floor of the tower. The building renovations were designed by Gutnayer & Associates, who found that the foundation could support the additional weight. Roosevelt University erected a 17-story dormitory tower next to the building in 1970, while the ATC continued to restore theatrical facilities such as the dressing rooms and stage. In 1972, Roosevelt University completed its renovation for $3.66 million, (Note: Equivalent to $21.3 million in 2025) which included modernization of classrooms, laboratories, and other educational facilities.

The hotel lobby was renovated in 1973 by Brenner, Danforth and Rockwell, which involved uncovering the mosaic floor and removing an existing partition. That year, the recital hall was renovated into the O'Malley Theater. The state government sought federal funding in 1975 for further restoration of the Auditorium Building, as part of a $1.3 million (Note: Equivalent to $6.0 million in 2025) initiative to upgrade 25 historic Chicago-area buildings. Stained glass windows in the hotel stair and Ganz Hall were restored that year. In 1976, Roosevelt University promised $3.891 million (Note: Equivalent to $17.1 million in 2025) for further renovations and sought a matching funds grant for the other half of that renovation. For their respective renovations, Roosevelt University and Spachner received awards from the National Trust for Historic Preservation in 1978.

==== 1980s and 1990s ====
The university renovated the southern end of its library (formerly the hotel's dining room), along with the ventilation system and roof, in 1980. The ATC was incorporated in 1981, though the Auditorium Theatre remained financially unsuccessful until later that decade, when it became profitable for the first time. This led to several long-running musicals being hosted there. Meanwhile, the building underwent additional renovations in the mid-1980s, which included repairs to light fixtures and stained glass windows. By then, $14.5 million had been spent on the building, including $10.5 million on the college's space. (Note: The amount spent on the building is equivalent to $36.8 million, while the amount spent on the spaces around the theater is equivalent to $26.6 million, in 2025) The university hired John Vinci later that decade to restore the rehearsal hall and create a master plan for the building. Booth/Hansen renovated the theater's foyer in 1992, funded by $1 million in ticket revenue. (Note: Equivalent to $2.1 million in 2025)

In 1994, Roosevelt University attempted to repurpose $1.5 million (Note: Equivalent to $3.0 million in 2025) of the Auditorium Theatre's operating funds for a new campus in Schaumburg, Illinois. This prompted a lawsuit from the ATC, which wanted to take control of the theater. The university eventually identified an alternate funding source for its campus, and a court ruled that the theater's funds could be used only for the building. The issue of control remained contentious over the next several years, amid a series of conflicting court rulings. By the late 1990s, the theater needed renovation to comply with the Americans with Disabilities Act and upgrade outdated mechanical and utility systems, but the ongoing lawsuit prevented further progress on these upgrades. The opening of the Schaumburg campus in 1996 freed up space in the Auditorium Building, which was repurposed to host only performing-arts courses. By then, the Auditorium Building accommodated 3,800 students, but the building's interiors were hard to navigate and lacked sufficient elevators.

==== 2000s to present ====
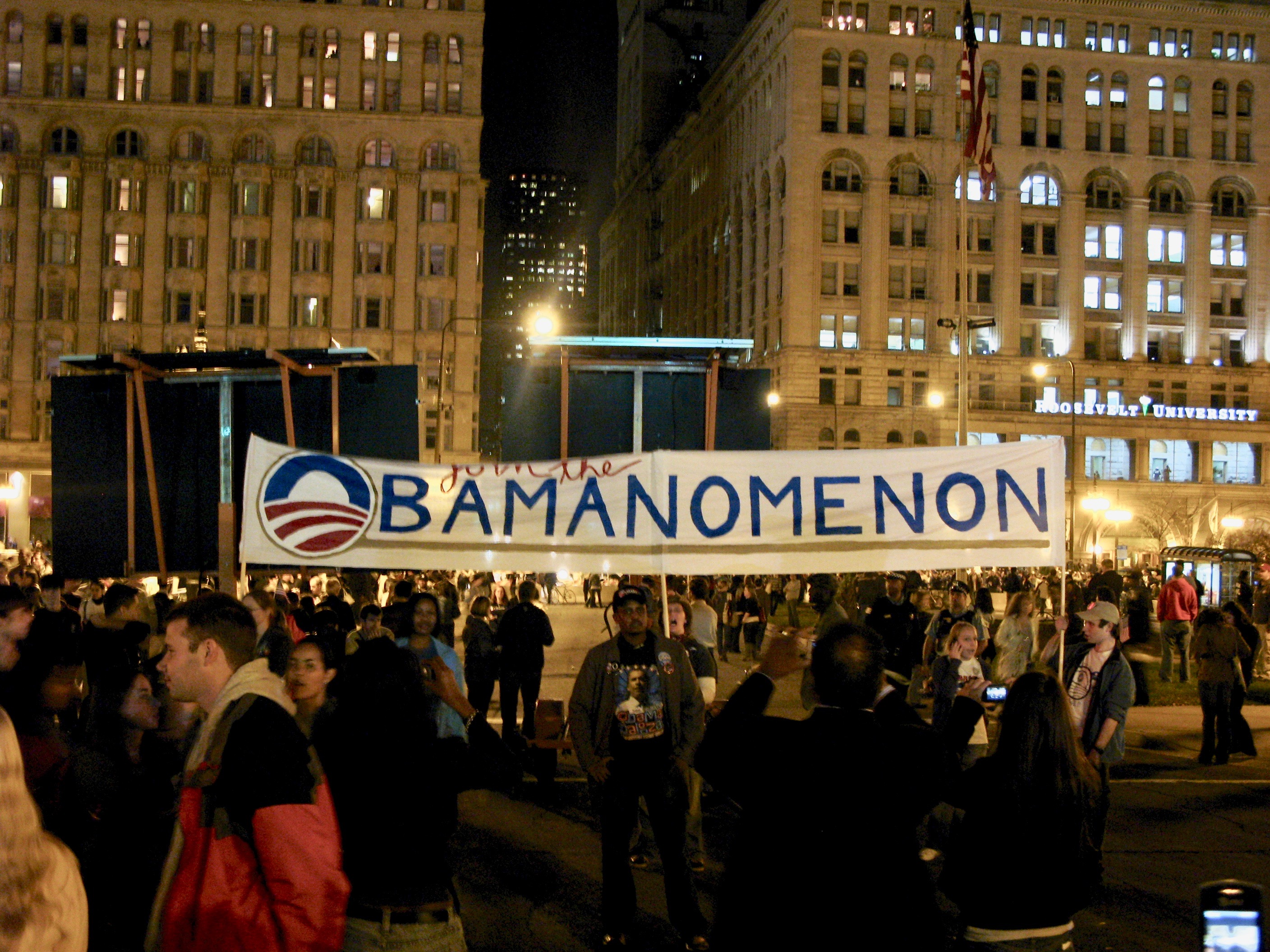
Crowd outside the Auditorium Building (right) and Congress Hotel (left) during Obama's Grant Park rally on the night of the 2008 election

In 2000, the state government provided funding for a $13.6 million renovation of the Auditorium Theatre. Roosevelt University also received $2 million in state funding to upgrade the building's classrooms, and it spent an additional $7 million on utilities, fire-stair enclosures, and elevator refurbishments. These projects were part of a wider-ranging renovation of the university's campuses. By the next year, the building's stained glass was being renovated. Workers at the Chicago Conservation Center restored 10 murals in Ganz Hall. The theater's stage and backstage areas were restored, as were the decorations. The legal dispute was not ultimately resolved until 2002, when the Supreme Court of Illinois ruled in favor of Roosevelt University. The university rededicated the renovated theater in September 2003, and Laurence Booth renovated Ganz Hall that year.

Roosevelt University built a tower next to the Auditorium Building in the early 2010s; this required constructing a cofferdam around the building's foundations to keep it stable. Restoration had proceeded in a piecemeal fashion, leading Booth to estimate in 2014 that it would cost $50–100 million to fully restore the building. Work on further renovations of the Auditorium Theatre, involving the theater's atrium and skylight, began in 2025. The project, costing over $2.5 million, was funded by a Save America's Treasures grant and private donations.

== Architecture ==
The Auditorium Building was designed by Dankmar Adler and Louis Sullivan of Adler & Sullivan. Two draftsmen, George Grant Elmslie and Frank Lloyd Wright, helped with design details, while Paul Mueller was involved with engineering. Adler & Sullivan's plans are no longer extant, so the roles of each architect are unknown, but Adler is sometimes cited as the primary architect. Wright wrote that the design was largely a product of Adler's "good judgment and restraining influence", writing that Sullivan had been "a novice in those days". Architect Arthur Woltersdorf wrote c. 1941 that "Adler remained the commanding architect of this great structure to its end". Other sources credit Sullivan with esthetic details and Adler with engineering details, given that Adler had convened with the building's structural and mechanical contractors, while Sullivan had met with interior designers and artists. Numerous subcontractors were involved with the mechanical features, although the building is not attributed to any general contractor.

The building is an early skyscraper standing mostly 10 stories high, with a main roof 144 feet (44 m) above ground. On the southern frontage is a 17-story tower, measuring about 71 by 40 feet (22 by 12 m) across. The tower rises approximately 95 feet (29 m) above the main roof, for a total height of about 240 feet (73 m). (Note: The height of the tower is variously given as 236 feet (71.9 m), 238 feet (72.5 m), or 240 feet (73.2 m). A contemporary source gives a conflicting height of 225 feet (69 m).) The Auditorium Building was one of the first major mixed-use buildings in the US; the hotel and offices, which wrapped around the Auditorium Theatre, were intended to offset losses from the theater. It was also the country's largest mixed-use building upon completion. The Auditorium Building was described as having 17 million bricks, 350 miles (560 km) of wiring, 760,000 square feet (71,000 m^{2}) of terracotta in the floors, 123,000 square feet (11,400 m^{2}) of granite and limestone, 10,000 square feet (930 m^{2}) of onyx and marble, and 60,000 square feet (5,600 m^{2}) of gold leaf.

=== Facade ===
Detail of the base at Congress and Wabash

The Auditorium Building has load-bearing exterior walls, similar to other early skyscrapers of the time, when skeletal-framed buildings with non-load-bearing facades were still uncommon. The facade was simple by contemporary standards and is divided vertically into bays measuring 16 feet (4.9 m) wide. It is articulated as three horizontal sections: a three-story base, four-story midsection, and three-story capital. Smaller horizontal subdivisions further distinguish the first and tenth stories, creating a 1-2-4-2-1 pattern. The building also has light courts at its rear, which are sparsely decorated and have been mostly filled in. None of the street-facing elevations overlook the theater.

The exterior appearance was based partly on the design of H.H. Richardson's Marshall Field Warehouse, also in Chicago. At the time, round-arched Richardson Romanesque buildings were gaining popularity in Chicago, and Sullivan tended to use Chicago-area buildings as architectural inspiration. Other possible factors in the facade's simplicity included Peck's appreciation of the Field Warehouse's architecture, Adler & Sullivan's newfound avoidance of ornate exterior ornamentation, and the CAA's needs and budget. One anecdote has it that Sullivan had changed his original plans after another architect disparaged Sullivan's use of ornament. The New York Produce Exchange Building may have influenced the design as well, and Sullivan also incorporated classical elements such as round arches and Tuscan columns. Historian Leland M. Roth wrote that the building drew parallels to the European Art Nouveau. The facade's imposing nature may have been necessitated by fears of unrest following the Haymarket bombing in 1886. The continued use of Romanesque motifs in the Auditorium Building also contrasted with the firm's Wainwright Building, designed two years later, which had a more pronounced emphasis on vertical details.

==== Lower stories ====
The first and second stories are clad in dark gray granite, arranged to give the appearance that they are cut from a single stone. On the southern elevation is a public arcade containing a city sidewalk. The main entrance is along Ida B. Wells Drive (formerly Congress) under the tower, where three arches lead to the theater. These arches each span two bays and are faced in stone. The hotel had several entrances; its primary entrance was a set of three arches on Michigan Avenue. Above the Michigan entrance is a six-bay-wide loggia with square piers at either end, monolithic columns between each bay, and monolithic lintels above; the loggia was originally an open-air balcony before being enclosed. The Wabash facade has a simpler entrance for the former offices. Lighter-toned Maine granite was used on the third story, except at the tower, where dark gray granite was used.

==== Upper stories ====
The facade on Michigan, with Congress Plaza Hotel at left

The midsection and capital are clad in lighter-toned Indiana limestone, an intentional design choice to set these stories off from the base. Behind the limestone cladding are brick walls. Within the midsection, each bay has arches spanning the fourth to seventh stories, with two windows per floor. The reveals of the arches step back toward the windows, and the semicircular seventh-story windows have wide mullions. Within the capital, each bay contains two double-height arches on the eighth and ninth stories, along with a tripartite window on the tenth floor. Adler & Sullivan had used limestone at the CAA's request, to create a sense of monumentality, but the limestone facades were so thick that they obstructed views from inside. There was also an outdoor courtyard above the center of the eighth story, which was infilled with extra interior space in the 1960s.

The main building is topped by a protruding cornice, which continues across the tower's facade as a horizontal course. The tower has additional arches, topped by a loggia and a small, windowless penthouse. The tower has large piers at its corners, and corbels at its cornice; its walls are up to 52 inches (1,300 mm) thick. When built, the tower was topped by a 30-foot (9.1 m) lantern. The tower's exclusive use of masonry contrasted with other contemporary Chicago high-rises such as the Chicago Board of Trade Building, which had a sheet-metal roof. The tower, which broke the uniformity of the southern elevation, drew attention at a time when most other early skyscrapers had flat roofs and relied on vertical ornamentation.

=== Structural and mechanical features ===
As the structural engineer, Adler was responsible for several of the building's structural features. These included the foundation, huge trusses above the theater, theatrical lift machinery, and mechanical systems. To ensure the theater had the most up-to-date equipment, Adler visited Europe to study similar theaters. The Auditorium Building weighs 110,000 short tons (98,000 long tons; 100,000 t), with an average load of 2 short tons per square foot (1.8 long ton/ft^{2}; 20 t/m^{2}). The tower exerts a greater load of 2.24 short tons per square foot (2.00 long ton/ft^{2}; 21.9 t/m^{2})—weighing 15,000 short tons (13,000 long tons; 14,000 t) over an area of 2,870 square feet (267 m^{2})—which required Adler to use a novel structural system.

==== Foundation ====
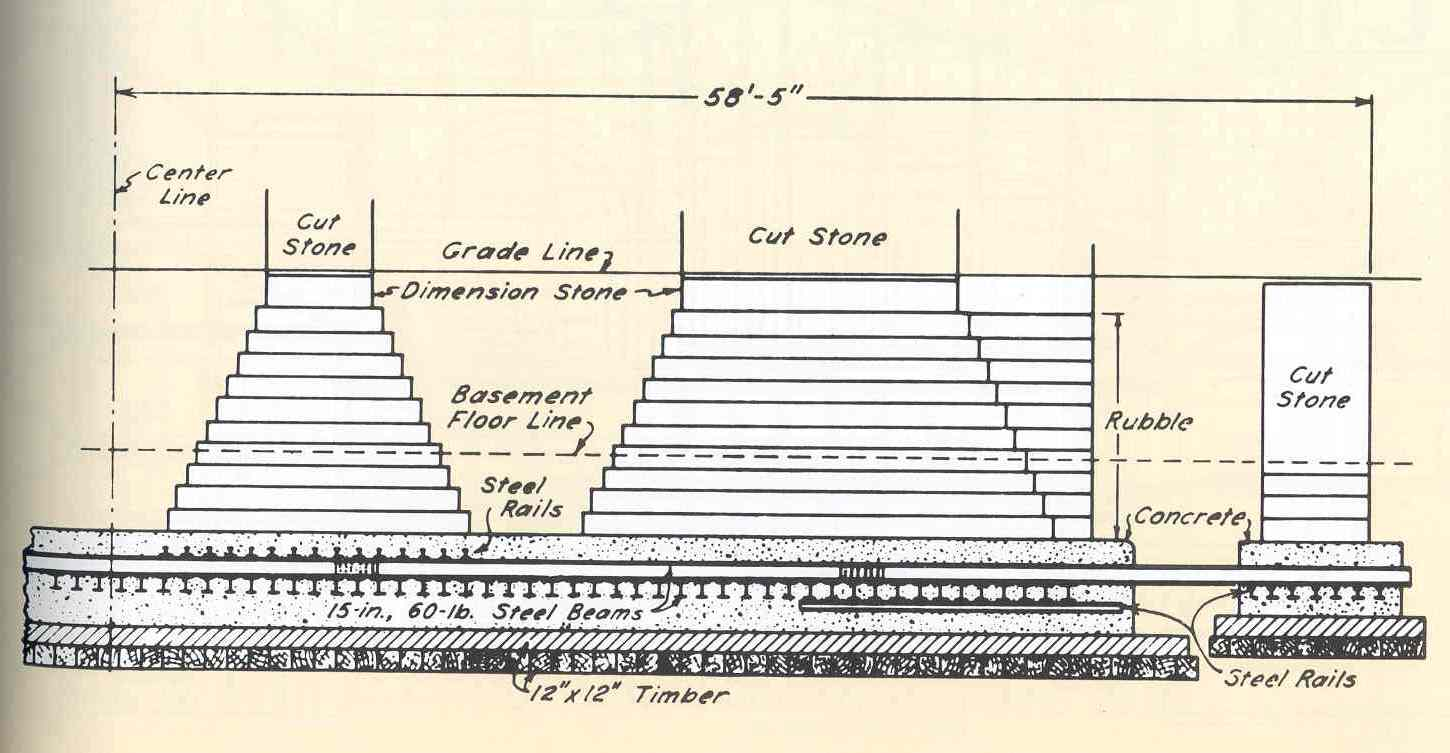
Foundation cross-section

The geology of the Auditorium Building site consists of soft hardpan up to 25 feet (7.6 m) below grade, with bedrock up to 75 feet (23 m) below grade, which made conventional foundations extremely expensive. The building was also less than 100 yards (91 m) away from Lake Michigan, and the bedrock was substantially lower than the lake's water level. Due to the weak ground, earlier buildings in Chicago, such as the Board of Trade Building, Main Post Office, and the old Chicago City Hall, had experienced severe issues with settlement. Based on test borings dug by engineer William Sooy Smith, the ground could support about 4,250 pounds per square foot (20,800 kg/m^{2}; 208,000 t/ha).

To combat possible settlement, Adler designed a custom foundation in conjunction with Paul Mueller. Unlike subsequent large American buildings constructed on loose ground, the foundation used no caissons or pilings. Instead, Adler and Mueller designed a grillage foundation with timber planks, above which were laid several perpendicular layers of concrete-encased steel rails and timber planks. The bottom layer of timbers is permanently submerged beneath a pool fed by water from Lake Michigan. This created a floating foundation, common for Chicago buildings of the time. Pyramidal concrete footings above the grillages supported the building's mass. The tower's foundations share a single grillage raft, with multiple layers of north–south and west–east rails extending outward from the tower walls. This allowed more even distribution of the tower's structural loads. Interior walls, separating the theater from other parts of the building, rest on continuous abutment footings, while other walls and columns sit on standalone footings.

The relative sturdiness of the foundations convinced Daniel Burnham, who was designing the 20-story Monadnock Building nearby, that it was safe to build such a tall structure in downtown Chicago. It also inspired the foundations of Wright's later Imperial Hotel in Tokyo. The walls still settled shortly after construction, sinking as much as 3 feet (0.91 m). (Note: Another figure of 30 inches (760 mm) has also been cited.) The Auditorium Theatre's directors changed the plans mid-construction to use heavier material, so the theater's floor level slopes down slightly at its northern and southern walls. The tower settled at an even greater rate, as it was expanded by two stories after the foundations were finished, causing its load to increase to 4,480 pounds per square foot (21,900 kg/m^{2}; 219,000 t/ha). Much of the settlement happened in the building's first decade, and settlement had stopped by the 1900s.

==== Superstructure ====
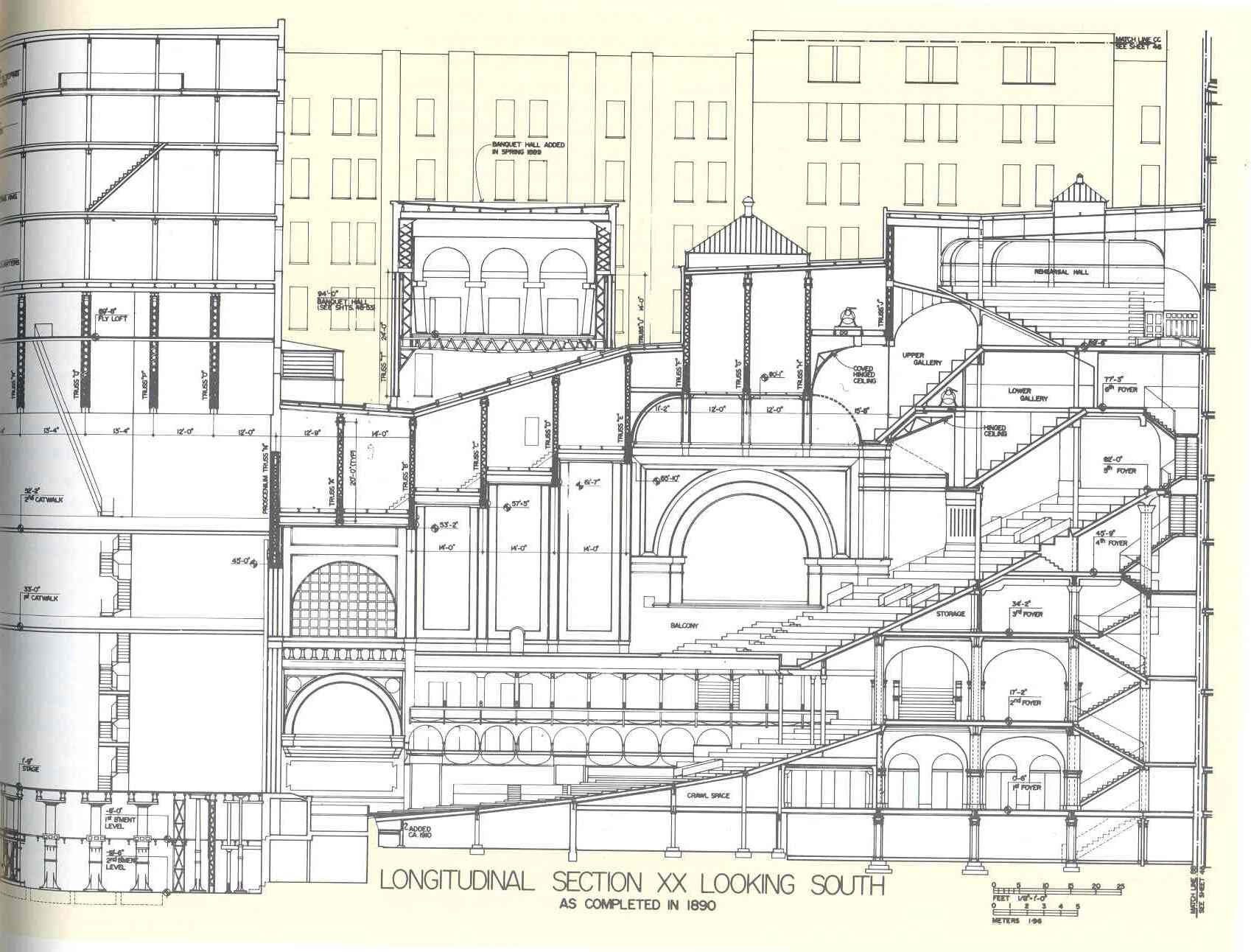
Interior cross-section

To prevent uneven settlement, the first ten stories were loaded evenly with large amounts of brick and pig iron. The loads in the tower were for prestressing and were gradually removed as the tower rose. Structural support is provided both by the load-bearing outer walls and by iron and steel structural members inside. Iron was not used in the walls themselves, but iron girders spanned between the walls, supporting the floor slabs. Mueller described the superstructure as being carried by iron columns above the second floor.

Steel and iron were mass-produced to consistent dimensions. To create column-free spaces on Congress Street for the hotel, Adler used north–south girders with clear spans of 36 feet (11 m) at the first floor, which are spaced 16 feet (4.9 m) apart west–east. To carry the upper stories above the theater, Adler incorporated six trusses running transversely above the theater's ceiling, with spans of up to 117 feet (36 m). The elliptical ribs of the theater's ceiling hang from longitudinal chords suspended from these trusses. The ceiling steps up toward the western end, above the seating areas. The seating levels themselves are supported by cast iron columns and wrought iron girders. The 1960s addition within the former roof courtyard is carried on steel girders, which in turn are anchored to "pockets" in the masonry walls.

==== Mechanical systems ====
When the Auditorium Building opened, it had the largest power plant of any individual building in the United States, and the theater was the first to be entirely lit by incandescent light bulbs. The power plant was relatively simple, with two direct current plants, one each under the hotel and office wings, and was made obsolete in 1893 when the Congress Hotel's power plant was built. The hotel section was also equipped with an annunciator system for guests, and a water tank was placed atop the tower. Lead-pipe connections are installed around utility pipes leading into the building.

The building was equipped with an early central air conditioning system, which pulled air from outside and rinsed it with water. The humid air was then blown through steam radiators during colder seasons and through blocks of ice during hotter seasons. Fans blew the treated air through ducts, which distributed the air across the building. The air circulation system used one shaft for air intake and two for exhaust, and a chimney protruded from the roof above the theater. Steam radiators were also installed in hallways and foyers. During the 1960s renovation, the ice and radiators were replaced with electric coils.

=== Interior ===
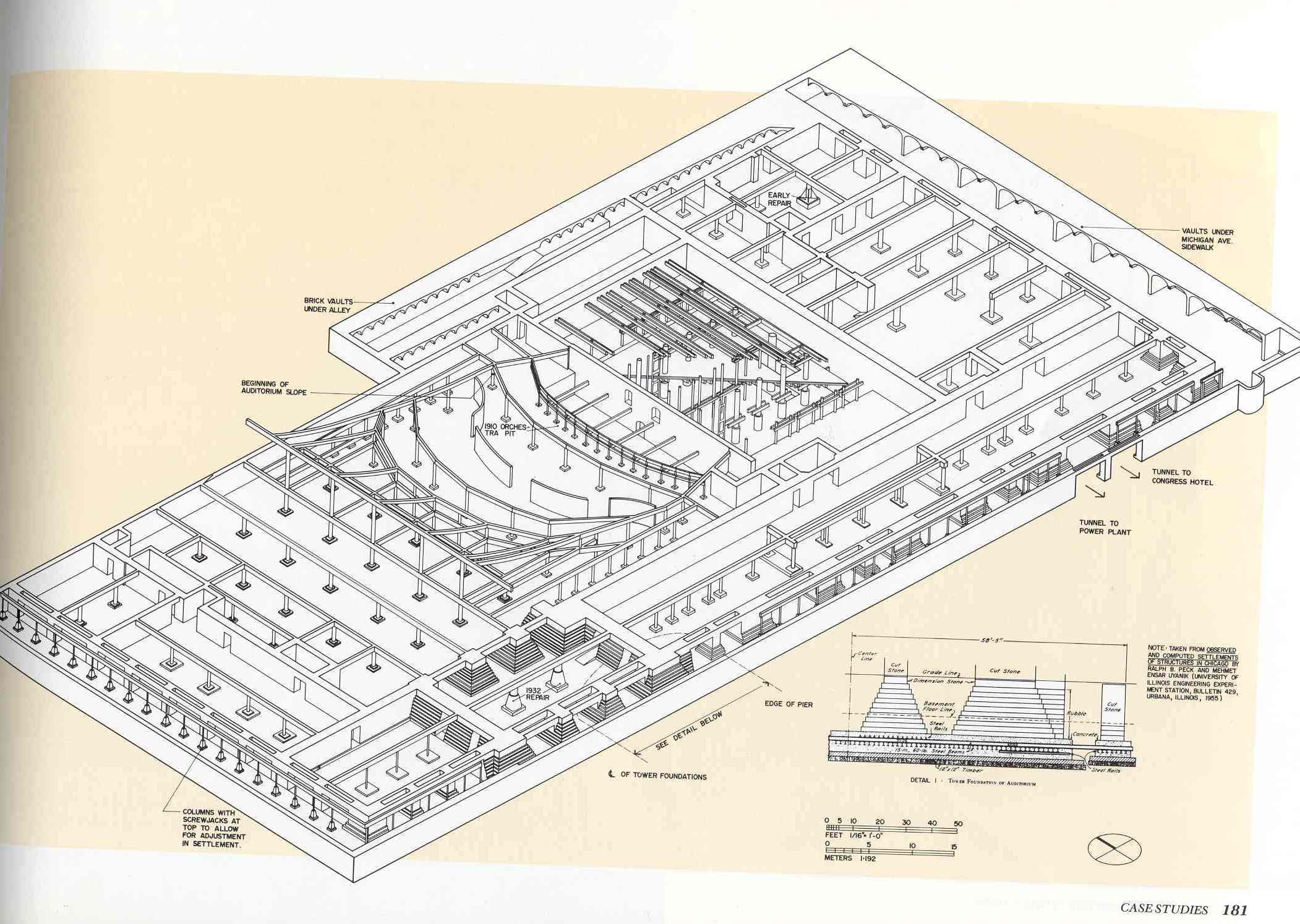
Basement

The interior has about 600,000 square feet (56,000 m^{2}) of floor area. The building spans 8,737,000 cubic feet (247,400 m^{3}), of which 40% is occupied by the Auditorium Theatre. Surrounding the theater is classroom space, formerly divided into 136 offices and 400 hotel rooms. The hotel was to the east, and the offices were to the west; the hotel also wrapped around the entire south elevation between the third and ninth floors. The tower housed parts of all three sections—the theater, hotel, and offices from bottom to top. The theater was the building's namesake and the primary reason for the structure's existence, while the offices and hotel were incidental.

Sullivan designed the interiors, including lobbies, parlors, and stairways. He delegated many details to a group of thirty draftsmen led by Wright. Several rooms had multicolored murals, which have been painted over throughout the years. In general, the major rooms were painted gold and one other color (e.g. ivory in the theater, white in the rehearsal hall, brown in the lobby, green in the ballroom, and blue in the ladies' parlor). For the interior finishes, material such as onyx, marble, and tile was used. Adler & Sullivan used a minimal amount of wood, obtaining high-quality wood wherever it was used.

==== Theater ====
The Auditorium Theatre occupies a 118-by-246-foot (36 by 75 m) rectangular area at the center of the building. The theater, the United States' largest at the time, originally had about 4,200 seats (Note: Some sources give a figure of exactly 4,200 seats. Other figures of 4,237, 4,250, or 4,300 seats have also been cited.) but had been downsized to 3,900 seats by 2017. The seats are split across an orchestra, a balcony, and two galleries; the galleries are placed one in front of the other. Paneled walls and ceilings could seal off the upper seating levels for smaller productions. All seats originally faced the stage, but horseshoe-shaped balconies were added in 1910. The Auditorium Theatre's boxes are placed on the side walls to allow unobstructed views of the stage. Grandstands on the stage could expand the capacity to 7,000 seats, and a hardwood extension of the stage could allow it to accommodate 8,000 dancers. Wright considered the theater "the greatest room for music and opera in the world, bar none".

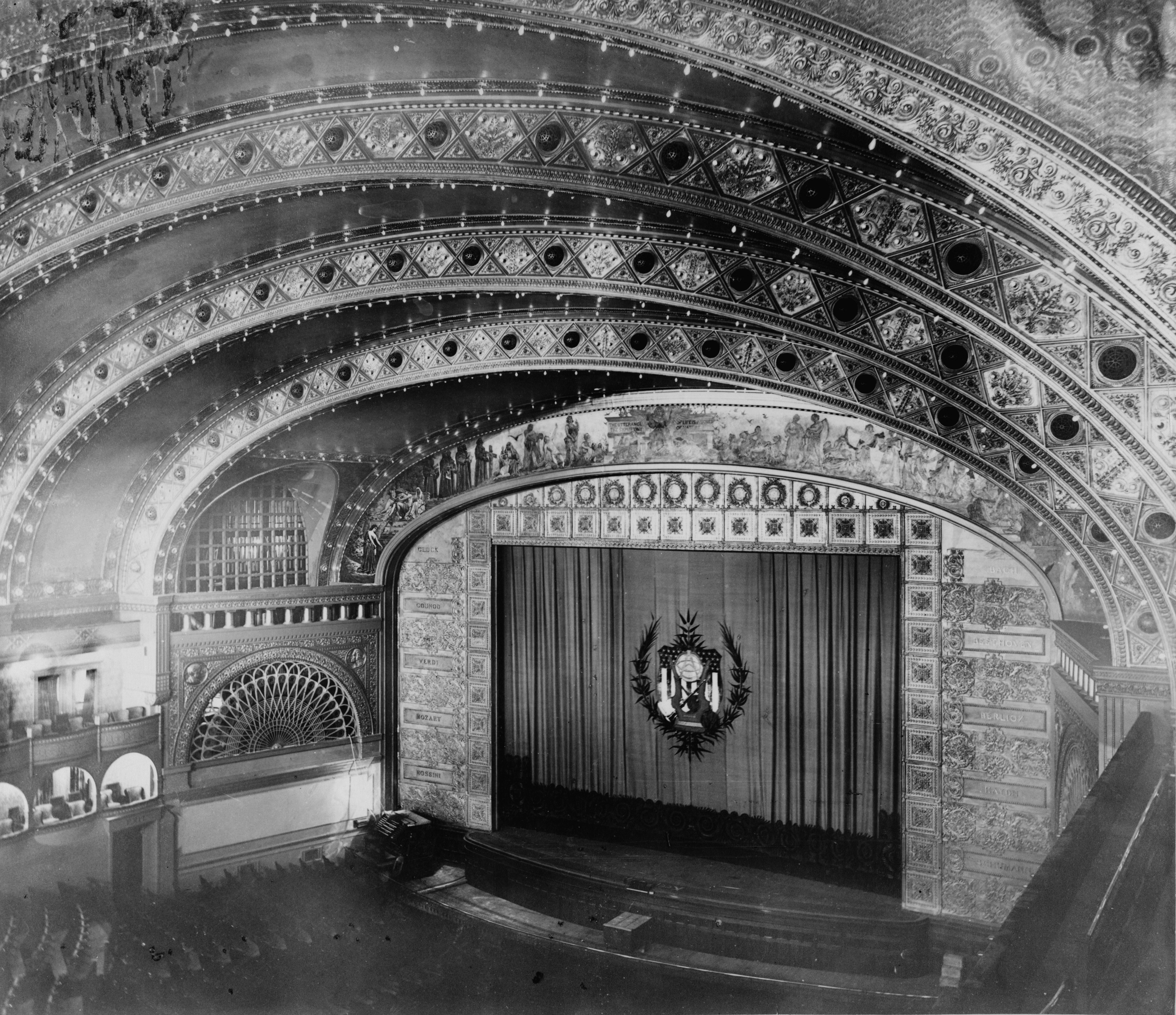
Interior of the Auditorium Theatre's main theater, facing the proscenium

The theater is accessed by a ground-level foyer with a marble floor and vaulted ceiling. Narrow, relatively dark tunnels connect the foyer to the theater's lowest (orchestra) seating level. Unlike European opera houses such as Paris's Palais Garnier, the theater lacked a grand stair hall. Instead, elevators and staircases ascend from the orchestra level to the balconies; these connect lobbies for the various seating levels, which are stacked directly above the foyer. Because the orchestra level slopes up 17 feet (5.2 m) from front to rear, another foyer on the second floor serves the rear orchestra. There are also secondary spaces such as cloakrooms and smoking rooms, along with a smoking lounge and retiring room on the second floor.

The seats face the proscenium arch and stage to the east. Ornamentation, composed of geometric or naturalistic motifs, is concentrated on the walls and ceiling ribs. There are four arched ribs on the theater's barrel-vaulted ceiling, which help amplify sound from the stage. Also on the ceiling is a skylight above the balcony. Two murals by Albert Fleury line the side walls. The proscenium arch is topped by another mural, variously credited to Fleury or Charles Holloway. The stage was among the largest in the US. (Note: The stage is variously cited as measuring 98 by 62 feet (30 by 19 m), 98 by 70 feet (30 by 21 m), or 100 by 70 feet (30 by 21 m).) Hydraulic machinery underneath could lift items from the basement, while the basement floor itself was covered in concrete, asphalt, and felt to prevent leakage. Frank Roosevelt constructed the theater's original 7,000-pipe organ, which was sold to Indiana University Bloomington in 1942. The inadequacy of the backstage areas necessitated the construction of dressing rooms over the alley to the north.

==== Hotel spaces ====
Diagram of the Auditorium Building's framework on the fourth through sixth floors, showing how the offices (left) and hotel (center and right) wrapped around the theater on three sides

Due to the space constraints posed by the theater, the hotel measured only 45 feet (14 m) wide on average, (Note: Namely, the Michigan wing was 50 feet (15 m) wide, and the Congress wing was 40 feet (12 m) wide.) and its ground level had public rooms rather than storefronts. The hotel's elaborate lobby was entered via Michigan Avenue, with marble and onyx floors and walls, along with elaborate ceilings supported by ornate columns. The lobby's reception counter, used by Roosevelt University as an information desk, still exists in shortened form. There were also several dining spaces, a parlor, a smoking room, service rooms, along with a cafe and barbershop. The main parlors were on the second floor just above the lobby. Separate parlors and restaurants were provided for male and female guests, at a time when gender-separated dining establishments were widespread across the US. The hotel also had four offices. Many parts of the amenity space have since been converted into university offices.

The hotel's upper-level spaces extended into the tower's third to tenth floors. The upper levels were connected by two elevators and by stairs with elaborate marble landings and plasterwork. In contrast to the lavish amenity spaces, not much attention was paid to the guestrooms, which spanned the second through ninth floors. The guestroom floors had suboptimal layouts. Corridors up to the sixth floor had rooms only on one side, as the other side was occupied by the theater. Half the units faced the alley or roof courtyard, rather than the street, and large portions of the upper floors were occupied by servants' bedrooms. Most units did not have en-suite bathrooms; instead, there were three to five shared bathrooms per floor. As for the rooms themselves, many measured 20 by 20 feet (6.1 by 6.1 m) across, and some were intended as long-term residences.

The banquet hall is above the theater, on the seventh floor. It was a last-minute addition to the plans and, as such, was squeezed between the roof trusses, with minimal fireproofing. Access was via elevators from the hotel's ladies' entrance, which led to gender-segregated antechambers. The banquet hall has been known since 1957 as Rudolph Ganz Memorial Hall (after a former president of Chicago Musical College). Ganz Hall includes a gold-leaf ceiling and elaborate chandeliers; the original chandeliers have been replaced with replicas. The walls have 10 pastoral murals painted by Fleury, which each measure 9 feet (2.7 m) wide, and the room also has 17 Michigan birch columns and elaborate ventilation ducts.

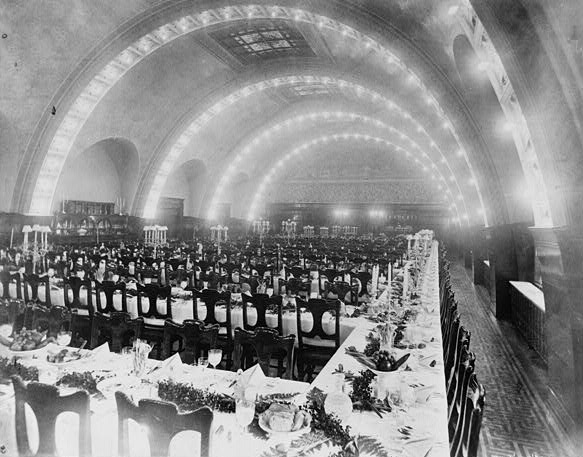
The Auditorium Hotel's dining room

The tenth story contains a barrel-vaulted space that was originally the hotel's dining room. The room measures 165 by 45 feet (50 by 14 m) wide and has five arched ribs on the ceiling, along with skylights framed by relief bands. Between each rib, the walls were originally decorated with murals. There were also two smaller dining spaces, one at each end. The dining room has since been converted into Roosevelt University's library. Bridges lead from the dining room to a structurally separate kitchen and pantries above the theater. A dumbwaiter connected the kitchen and banquet hall. The former kitchen space functions as library stacks.

==== Offices ====
The office wing was sparsely decorated and consisted of two discontinuous sections: the tower and the Wabash Avenue frontage. The Wabash frontage had about 70 offices, served by three elevators. The Wabash lobby (now demolished) was made of plain white marble and cast iron. As in the hotel, corridors up to the sixth floor had offices on one side and the theater on the other. The offices in the tower's eleventh through seventeenth floors were served by express elevators from the theater's Congress entrance. To save space, the tower offices had very narrow corridors and elevators; the original elevators were removed when Congress was widened. A new elevator and a mezzanine above the fifteenth floor date from the 1970s renovations.

The offices were separated from the theater by a masonry wall and connected to the theater at several locations. These included iron bridges from the offices' sixth floor to the upper seating levels, as well as a connection to the recital hall at the seventh floor. The former office section's seventh floor includes the Auditorium Theatre's rehearsal hall, a 500-seat space directly above the Auditorium Theatre's upper gallery. The rehearsal hall has a skylight and similar elaborate gold-and-ivory decorations to the main theater. Later known as the O'Malley Theater, the rehearsal hall does not retain any original decorations.

== Impact and legacy ==
=== Reception ===
When the building was under construction, one writer predicted it would be "without exception, the most magnificent ever erected for or devoted to hotel purposes in the United States". The International Fire-Proofer wrote that the building was "the pride and glory of Chicago", made possible by modern building technologies such as the elevator and terracotta. Visitors such as Cornelius Vanderbilt II and Chauncey Depew lauded the design. A contemporary observer called the Auditorium Building "less expressive of progress in architecture than of the march of empire" to the American Midwest. After the building was completed, The American Architect and Building News wrote that the building was "effective more by its size than by any architectural composition", and another observer said the building "may present a magnificent exterior and yet be wanting in beauty".

When Sullivan died in 1924, the St. Louis Globe-Democrat said the Auditorium Building "must be considered Sullivan's greatest work", and American Builder magazine considered the building's acoustics unsurpassed in quality. Architect Howard Robertson regarded the building as an example of Sullivan's experiments with architectural expression and engineering. The Christian Science Monitor wrote in 1939 that the interior bore "the imprint of Louis Sullivan's talent". Aline B. Saarinen wrote in 1956 that "the building was an engineering and architectural triumph", praising both Sullivan's decorations and Adler's acoustics. The Chicago Daily Tribune cited the Auditorium and Carson Pirie Scott buildings as Sullivan's two major accomplishments in Chicago.

In the 1960s and 1970s, historian Carl Condit called it "the triumph in the traditional materials of masonry and iron and the structural forms appropriate to them". Country Life likened the Auditorium Building to "a Florentine Renaissance palazzo of infinitely exaggerated proportions", while Artforum described it as "an architectural masterpiece—a fully realized plexus of form, expressive structure and ornament". In a 1976 poll of American-architecture experts, several experts ranked the Auditorium Building among the United States' best buildings. Among Sullivan's biographers, Narciso Menocal wrote that the Auditorium Building's lack of ornamentation exuded masculinity, and Hugh Morrison called it "a turning point in Sullivan's style and [...] a great institution in the civic life of Chicago".

The American Institute of Architects' 2007 List of America's Favorite Architecture ranked the Auditorium Building 147th on a list of the top 150 buildings in the United States. One writer in 2012 called the Auditorium Building "Sullivan's first outstanding skyscraper", and another writer stated in 2016 that the masonry design "granted an air of permanence to a structure designed to anchor and unify a city" that was, at the time, in political flux.

=== Architectural influence ===
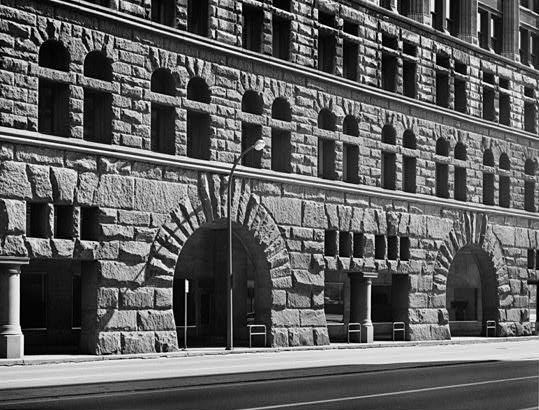
The building's completion brought renown to Adler & Sullivan.

The Auditorium Building's completion brought renown to Adler & Sullivan. Wright, later a famous Prairie School architect in his own right, recalled that "the building became famous before it was completed", Robert Twombly wrote that the Auditorium Building was "perhaps the single edifice for which Adler & Sullivan were and remain best known", while John Welchman called the structure "the major and, in the end, the premium product" of the men's partnership.

The Auditorium Building presaged other large mixed-use American buildings of the 20th century, as well as Adler & Sullivan's own work of the early 1890s. Adler & Sullivan subsequently designed other major structures such as the Wainwright Building, Schiller Building, and Guaranty Building, along with the World's Columbian Exposition structures. Adler's daughter later recalled that the structure had "the first music hall to be built inside a building", predating Carnegie Hall, for which Adler was later hired as a consultant. Sullivan's career faltered after Adler left the partnership in 1895, and Sullivan eventually gave up his Auditorium Building office in 1918.

=== Media ===
The building's decorations were depicted in exhibits of Sullivan's work, such as a 1948 exhibit at California's Riverside College Art Galleries and a 1966 exhibit at New York's Low Memorial Library. While teaching at the Institute of Design at the Illinois Institute of Technology in 1952, photographer Aaron Siskind had his students photograph the Auditorium Building and Sullivan's other work. Roosevelt University collated drawings and photographs of the building in a 1977 book, and the Historic American Buildings Survey and the Historic American Engineering Record documented it extensively between 1979 and 1980. The Auditorium Building was also the subject of a 1994 documentary by Terry Spencer and a 2002 book by Joseph Siry.

=== Landmark designations ===
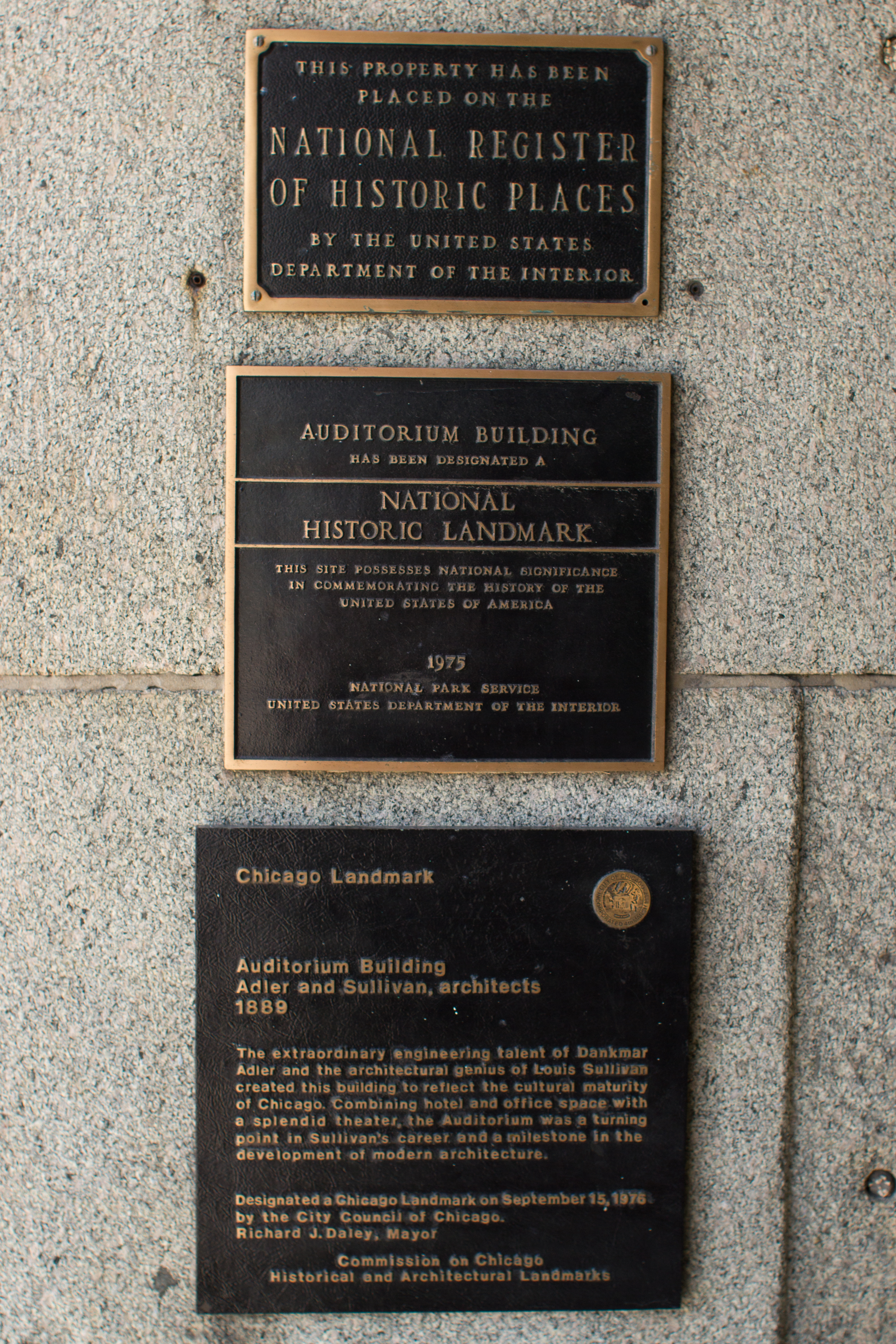
Historical markers

Chicago's Commission on Architectural Landmarks designated the Auditorium Building as a landmark in 1958, citing its mixture of uses, the theater's acoustics, the building's foundation design, and the "genius of the architect". The building was one of the commission's first five landmarks, along with the Carson Pirie Scott, Rookery, and Monadnock buildings and Robie House. After the Commission on Chicago Landmarks replaced the Commission on Architectural Landmarks in 1968, the new commission held hearings in 1973 to determine whether to affirm the building's landmark status. Though Roosevelt University supported preserving the building, university officials objected that a formal designation would make it harder to obtain financing. The Auditorium Building was ultimately re-listed as a Chicago Landmark on September 15, 1976. The building was subsequently nominated for inclusion in the Michigan Boulevard District, a Chicago Landmark district established in 2002.

The Auditorium Building was added to the National Register of Historic Places on April 17, 1970, and was declared a National Historic Landmark (NHL) by the United States Department of the Interior in 1975. It is one of several Adler & Sullivan buildings to be granted NHL designation. (Note: The firm's Wainwright Building, Guaranty Building, and James Charnley House are also designated as NHLs. Other National Historic Landmarks designed by Sullivan alone include the Carson Pirie Scott Building, Bayard–Condict Building, Harold C. Bradley House, Farmers and Merchants Union Bank, Merchants' National Bank, National Farmers' Bank of Owatonna, People's Federal Savings and Loan Association, and Van Allen Building.) In 2017, the Auditorium Building and several other early skyscrapers in Chicago were identified as possible future nominees to UNESCO's World Heritage List under the name "Early Chicago Skyscrapers".

== See also ==
- List of Chicago Landmarks
- List of National Historic Landmarks in Illinois
- National Register of Historic Places listings in Central Chicago
