= Milward Adams =

Performing arts manager (1857–1923)

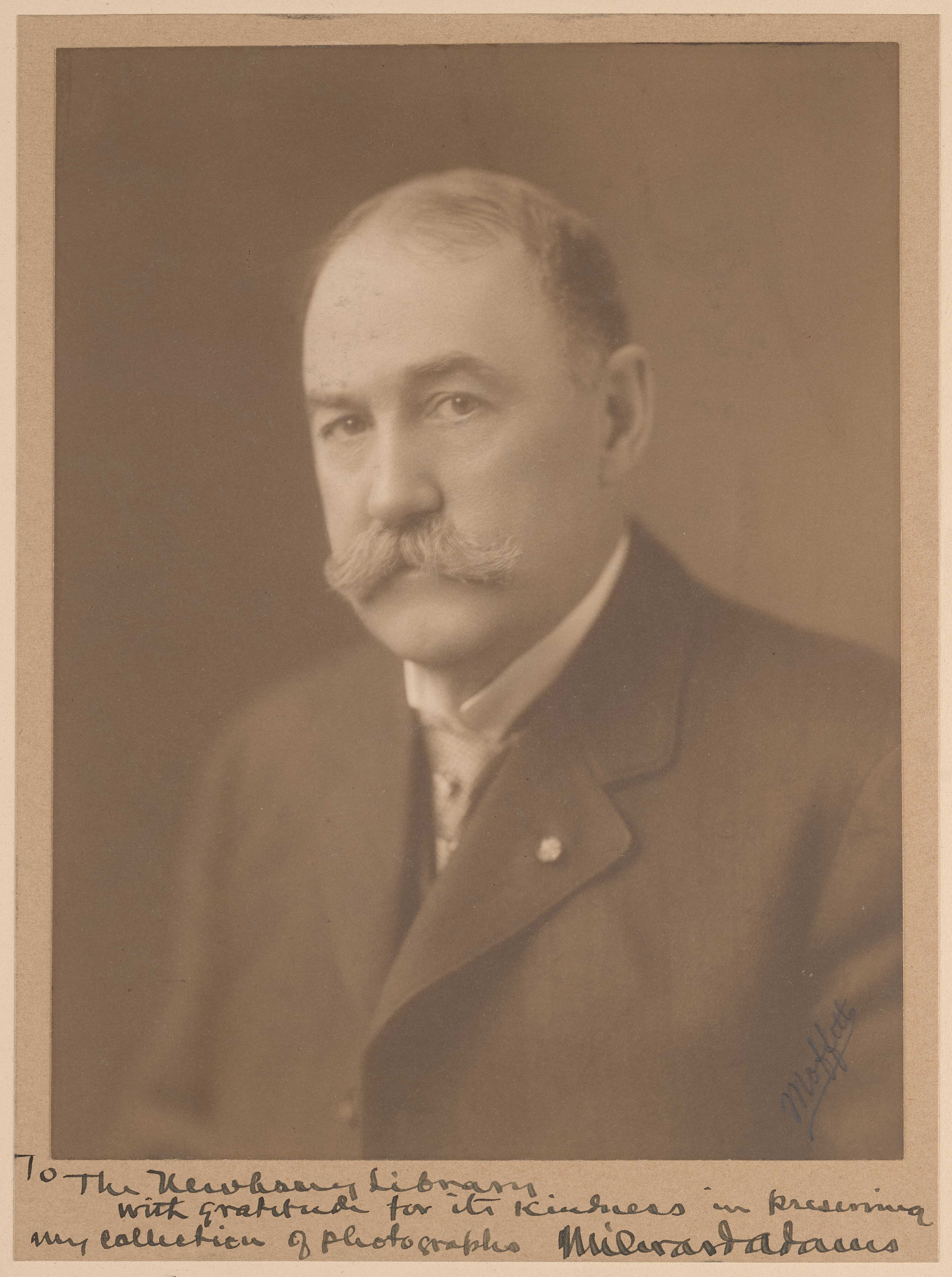
- Born: January 6, 1857; Lexington
- Died: June 18, 1923; Auditorium Building

Milward Adams (January 6, 1857 – June 18, 1923) was born in Lexington, Kentucky.

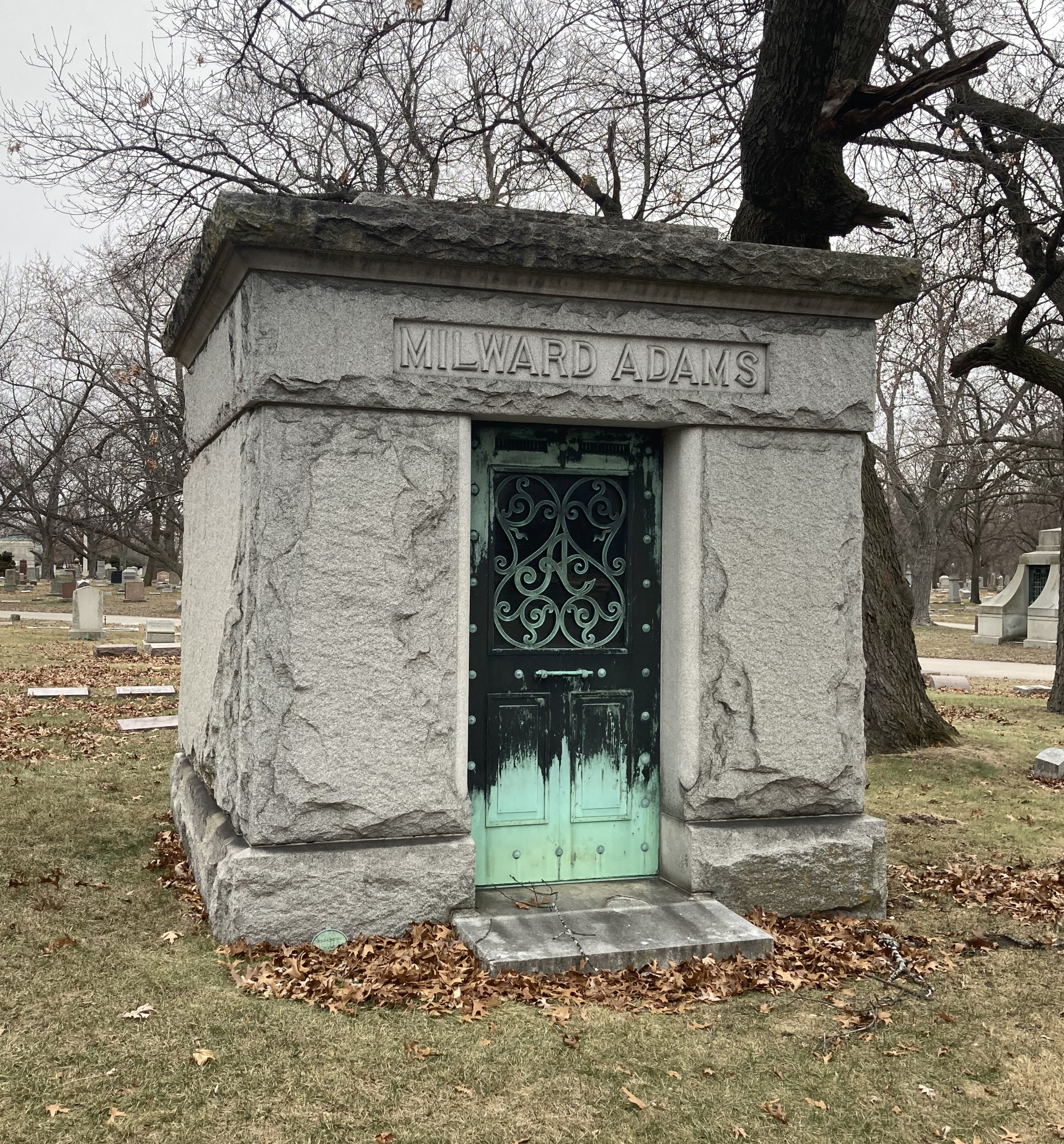
Adams mausoleum at Rosehill Cemetery

Adams rose to prominence as the first manager of the Chicago Symphony Orchestra and the Auditorium Theatre. Adams worked his way up in the performing arts world, beginning as a janitor at various theaters and ending as a theater manager with many connections in the Chicago arts scene.

He managed the great May musical festivals of 1882 and 1884; also summer night concerts under the direction of Theodore Thomas for ten years.

He died at the Auditorium Hotel on June 18, 1923.
