= Auditorium Theatre =

Music and performance venue in Chicago, Illinois

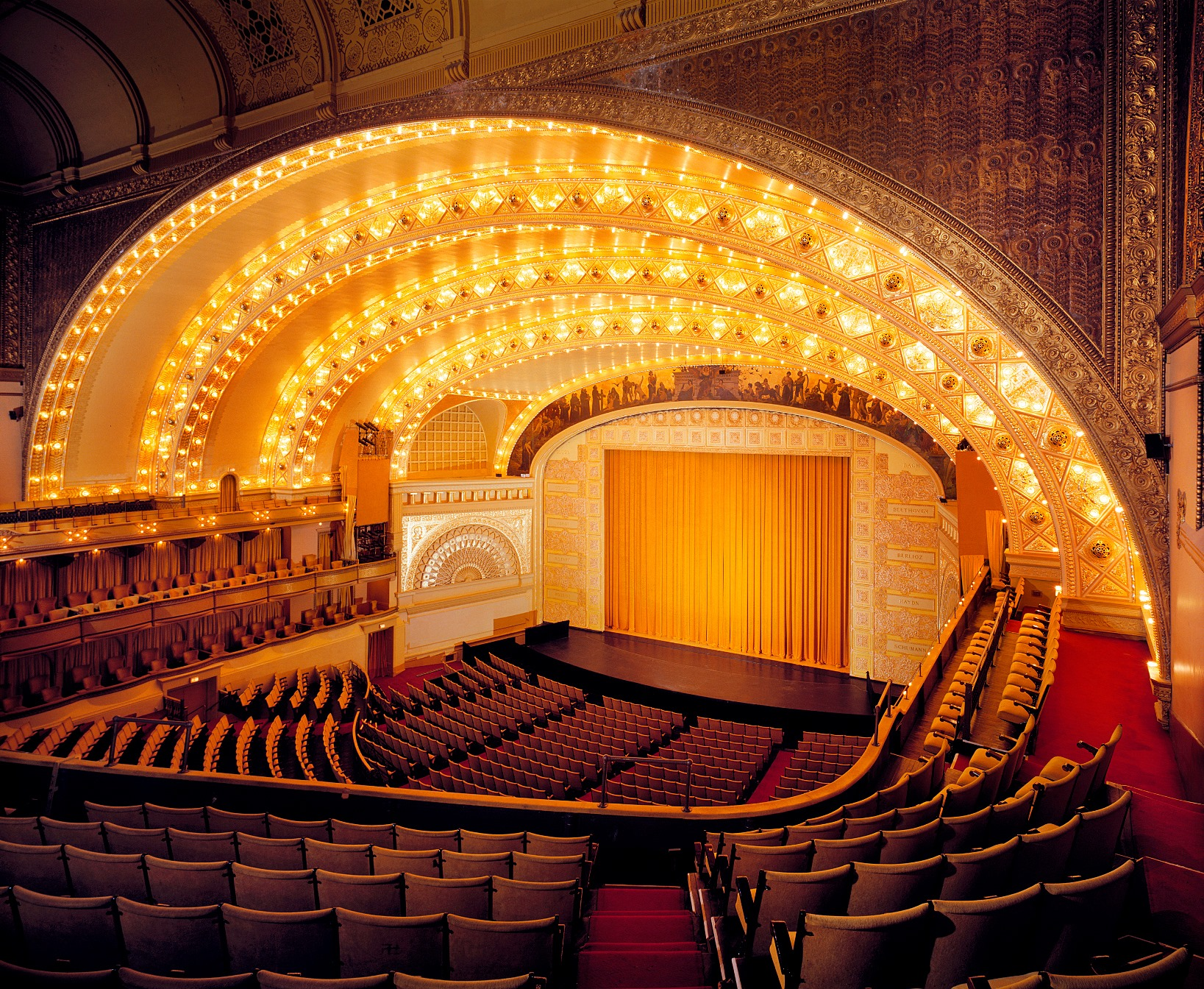
- Interior, photographed in 2017
- Interactive map of Auditorium Theatre
- Address: 50 East Ida B. Wells Drive
- Location: Chicago, Illinois, United States
- Coordinates: 41.8760639°N 87.6251856°W
- Owner: Roosevelt University
- Capacity: 3,875

Construction
- Opened: December 9, 1889
- Renovated: 1967
- Architects: Dankmar Adler and Louis Sullivan

Tenant
- Joffrey Ballet

Website
- auditoriumtheatre.org

The Auditorium Theatre is a music and performance venue in the Auditorium Building at 50 E. Ida B. Wells Drive in Chicago, Illinois. Inspired by the Richardsonian Romanesque style of architect Henry Hobson Richardson, the building was designed by Dankmar Adler and Louis Sullivan and completed in 1889. The Chicago Symphony Orchestra performed in the theatre until 1904 as well as the Chicago Grand Opera Company and its successors the Chicago Opera Association and Chicago Civic Opera until its relocation to the Civic Opera House in 1929. The theater was home to the Joffrey Ballet from 1998 until 2020. It currently hosts a variety of concerts, musicals, performances, and events. Since the 1940s, it has been owned by Roosevelt University and since the 1960s it has been refurbished and managed by an independent non-profit arts organization.

== History ==
=== Opening and early years ===
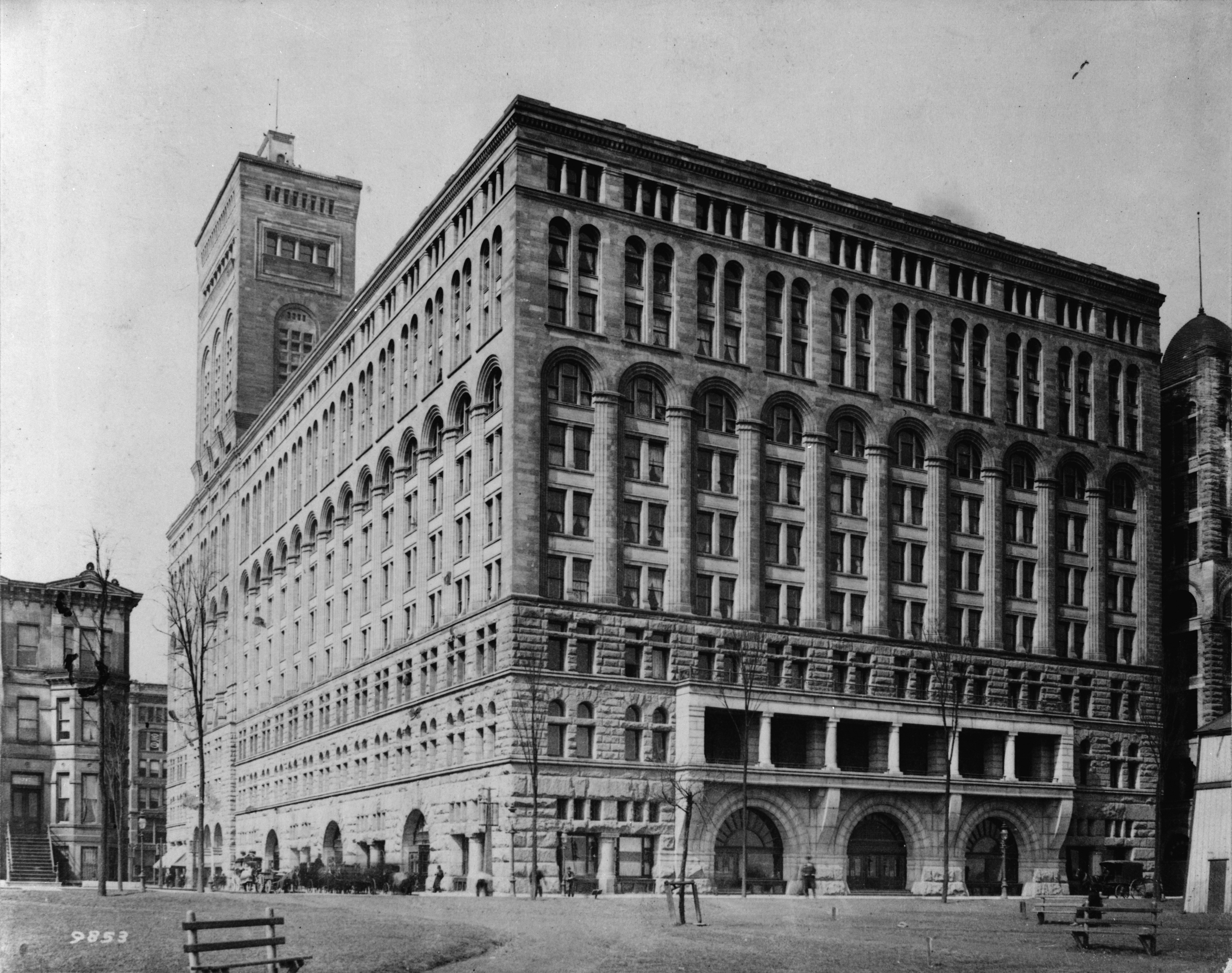
The Auditorium Building, photographed in 1890

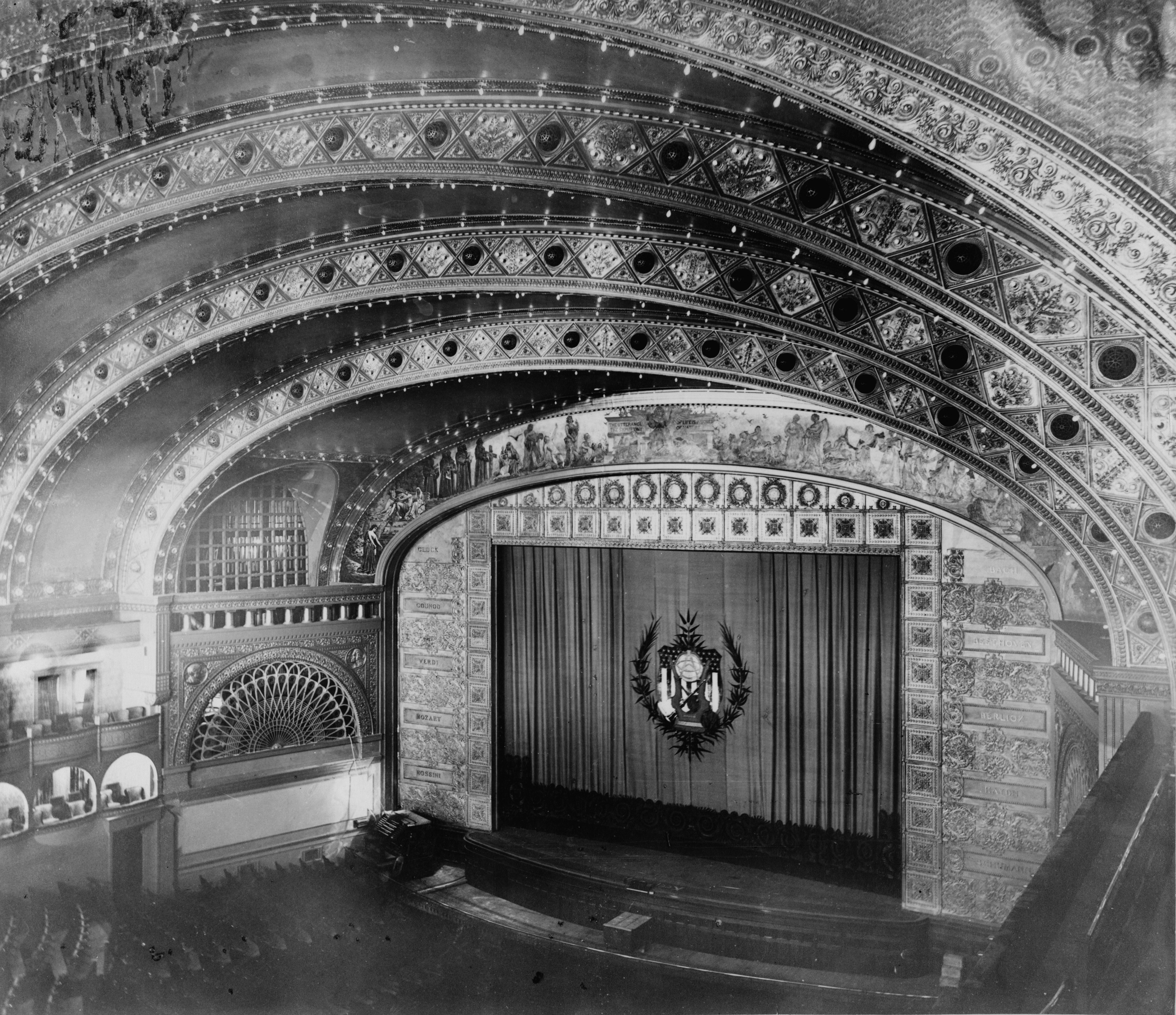
Auditorium Theatre, photographed in 1890

In 1885, Chicago-based businessman and philanthropist Ferdinand Wythe Peck began ambitious plans for the building that would house the Auditorium Theatre. At the time, Chicago was still recovering from the 1871 Great Chicago Fire and was rife with the contentious labor issues that would lead to the 1886 Haymarket Square bombing. Peck was committed to building a state-of-the-art performance venue that would make high culture available to the general public, while also helping to bolster Chicago's sullied reputation. To subsidize the cost of performances, Peck envisioned a new concept in design: a multi-use structure that would encompass the theatre, as well as a luxury hotel and office space; proceeds from the hotel and offices would fund performances and keep ticket prices affordable. The architecture firm Adler and Sullivan was retained to design the building at the corner of Michigan Avenue and Congress Street. It is considered to be one of their most notable buildings during their partnership together.

The gala opening night performance on December 9, 1889, was a major social event bringing together politicians and national leaders. In attendance were President Benjamin Harrison, Vice President Levi Morton, Illinois Governor Joseph Wilson Fifer, Chicago Mayor DeWitt Clinton Cregier, the theatre's financial backers, and the city's elite. President Harrison (who had visited the Auditorium in 1888, when the theatre, still a construction site, housed 9000 Republican National Convention attendees) was evidently so impressed that he was rumored to have whispered to Vice President Levi P. Morton, "New York surrenders, eh?" Crowds of people lined the streets waiting to get a glimpse of the famous and wealthy guests. A highlight of the evening was opera star Madame Adelina Patti's rendition of John Howard Payne's "Home Sweet Home".

Floor plan of orchestra level, circa 1897

Floor plan of main balcony level, circa 1897

The Auditorium Theatre played a critical role in Chicago being named host for 1893 World's Columbian Exposition. Local civic leaders in Chicago were vying with those in St. Louis, New York City, and Washington to host a fair that could reestablish Chicago as a destination for travel and commerce. The international sensation brought about by the opening of the Auditorium was seen by Congress as an indication that the people of Chicago possessed the vision and financing to successfully produce a world-class fair.

During its early years, the Auditorium stage played host to the leading entertainers of the era, including John Philip Sousa, Sarah Bernhardt, The Ziegfeld Follies, Anna Pavlova, and Helen Morgan, as well as political figures including Theodore Roosevelt, Franklin D. Roosevelt, and Booker T. Washington. In 1912, Teddy Roosevelt famously told the Auditorium crowd, he felt "as strong a bull moose", during his controversial run for an additional term as United States' president. It was also the home to the Chicago Symphony Orchestra and the Chicago Grand Opera Company, and also featured indoor baseball games.

=== Decline and closing ===
Peck's hope that the revenue from the hotel and offices would subsidize the cost of presenting performances ultimately proved unsustainable, particularly as more modern hotels (featuring private bathrooms) came about. The Chicago Symphony Orchestra moved to Orchestra Hall in 1904, and the Grand Opera relocated to the Civic Opera House in 1929. In the early 1930s, estimates were taken to demolish the building, but the cost of the demolition was more than the land was worth. Following a run of the comedic musical revue "Hellzapoppin", the Auditorium Theatre went bankrupt and closed in 1941. In 1942, the Auditorium was taken over by the City of Chicago to be used as a World War II servicemen's center. The stage and front rows of the theatre were converted to a bowling alley and much of the ornate stenciling, plasterwork, and art glass was covered over. At the Auditorium Building, more than 10 million servicemen used the servicemen's center until it closed in 1946.

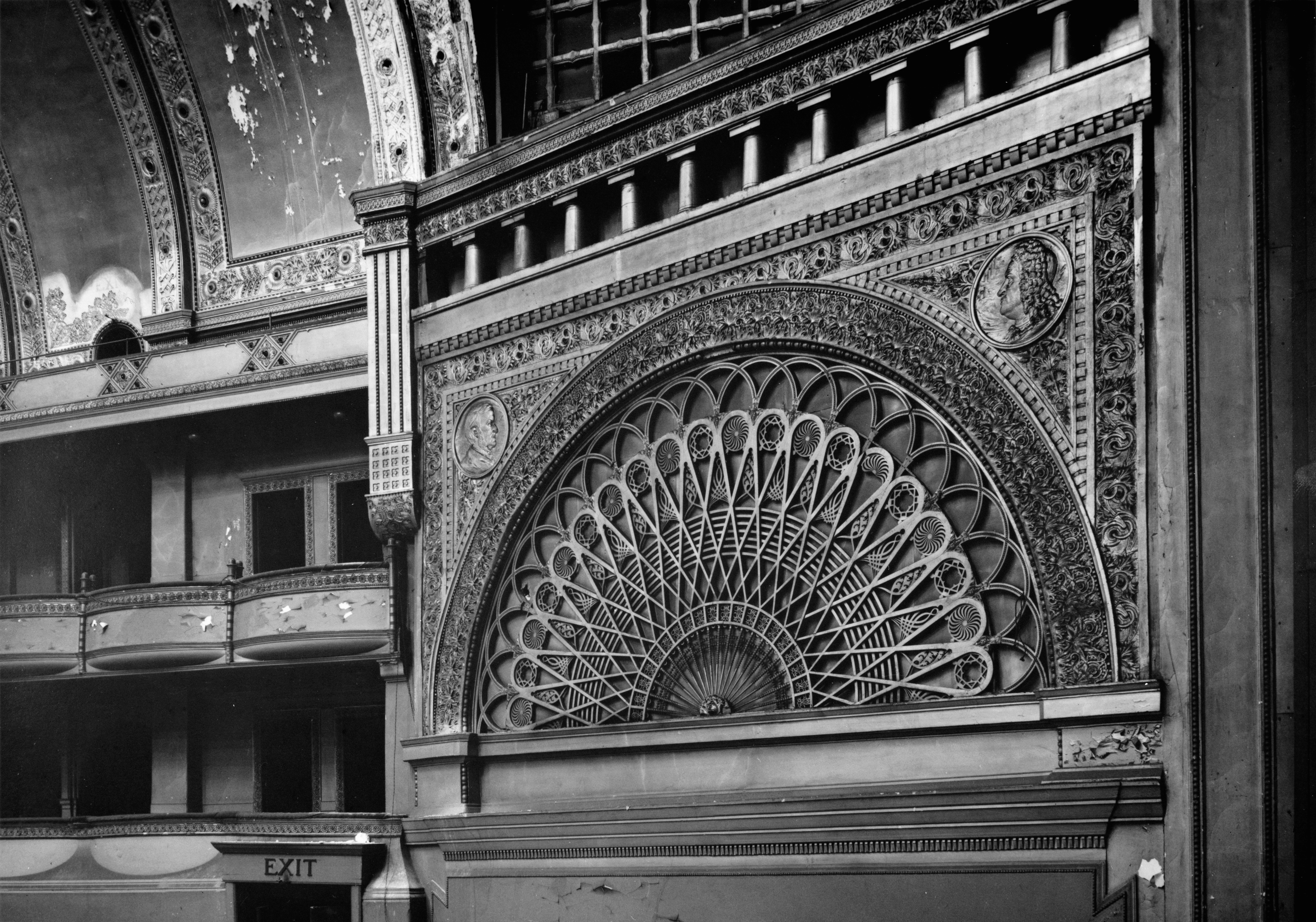
Visible damage on the Auditorium Theatre's plaster work before the renovation

=== Revival ===
In 1946, Roosevelt University saved the venue from demolition by acquiring the building, but lacking the money required to renovate the theatre, kept it dormant for two decades. In 1963, Mrs. Beatrice Spachner, with the approval of Roosevelt University, created the Auditorium Theatre Council and undertook a campaign to restore and reopen the theatre, raising nearly $3 million to renovate the structure. Architect Harry Weese oversaw the refurbishment of the theatre, and on October 31, 1967, the Auditorium Theatre reopened with a gala performance of the New York City Ballet's production of A Midsummer Night's Dream.

=== Music, dance, and productions ===
Musicians who have performed at the theater include French organist Alexandre Guilmant in 1893 for the Chicago World's Fair and Russian pianist Sergei Prokofiev in 1921. Prokofiev's opera L'amour des trois oranges had its world premiere at the theater on December 30, 1921.

Since its reopening in the 1960s, a host of rock and pop performers have played at the theatre, including Ray Charles, The Beach Boys, The Monkees, The Doors, Deep Purple, The Impressions, James Brown, Jackie Wilson, Diana Ross & the Supremes, Jefferson Airplane, Genesis, David Gilmour, Jimi Hendrix, The Who, Janis Joplin, David Bowie, Bruce Springsteen, Elton John, Aretha Franklin, Grateful Dead, Osibisa, Parliament-Funkadelic, James Taylor, Liza Minnelli, Bette Midler, Queen and Neil Young.

Dance companies who have performed at the theater include Alvin Ailey American Dance Theater, Bolshoi Ballet, and American Ballet Theatre. Broadway musicals with long-running productions at the theatre have included The Phantom of the Opera, Les Misérables, Miss Saigon, Show Boat, Hello Dolly!, The King and I, and The Who's Tommy.

On July 5, 1970, Crosby, Stills, Nash & Young performed at the venue, with a portion of the concert recorded for their live double album 4 Way Street.

=== Present ===
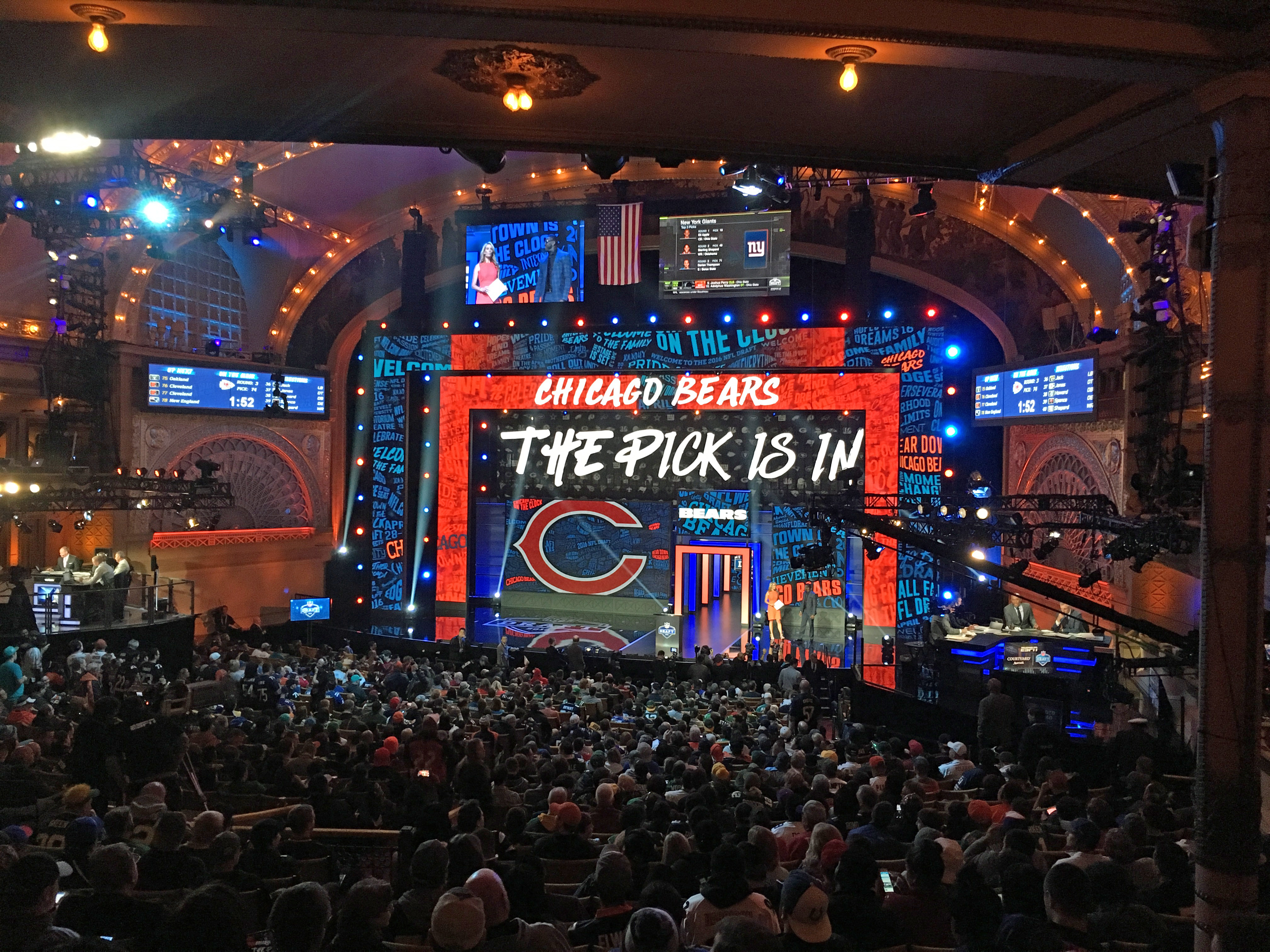
2016 NFL draft being held at the venue

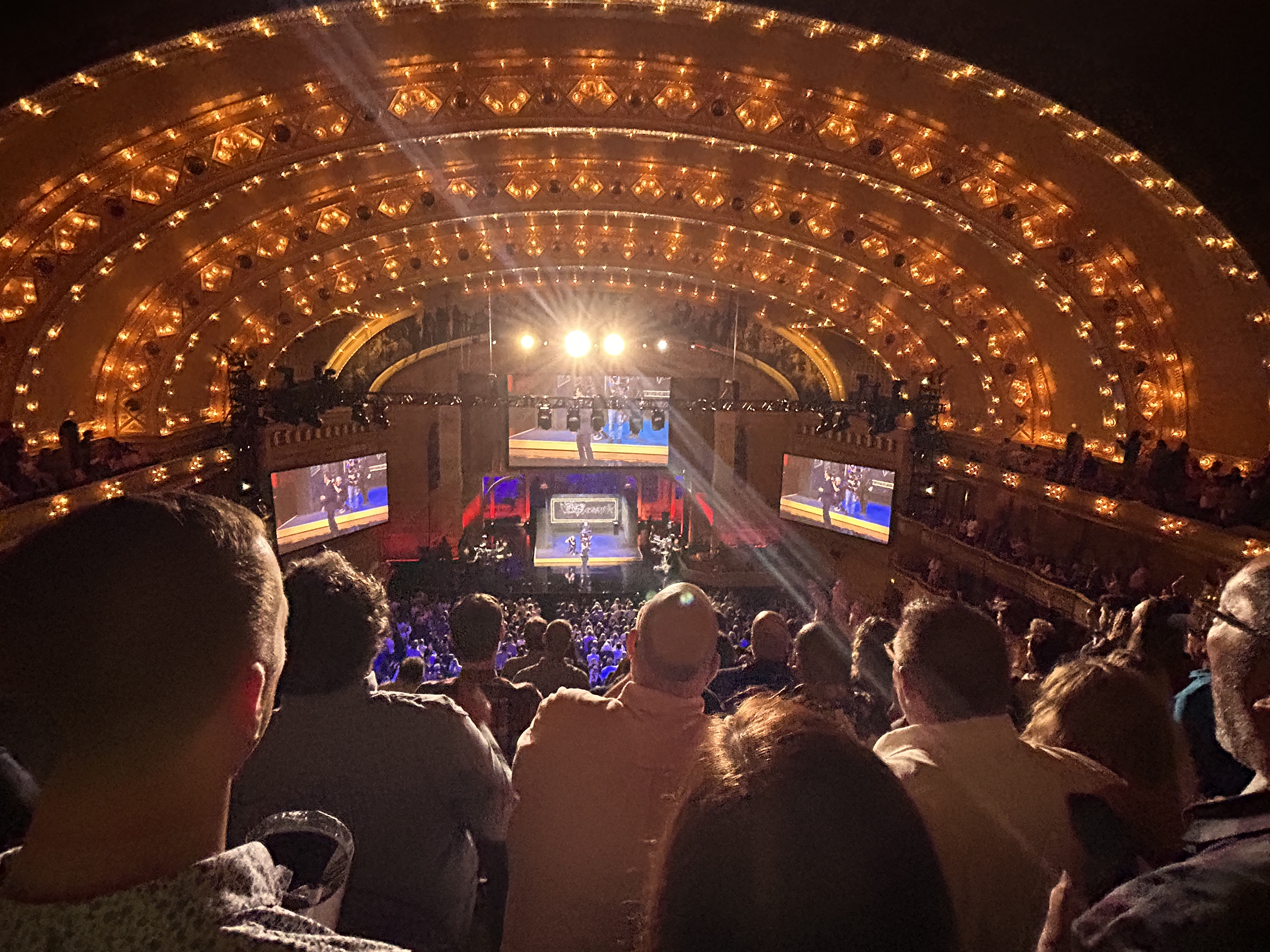
The Late Show with Stephen Colbert filming a live episode at the venue during the 2024 Democratic National Convention

Today, the Auditorium Theatre continues to maintain and restore the Adler & Sullivan building. Recent innovations include the introduction of the theatre's first public elevator as well as the Katten/Landau Studio housed in the Roosevelt University Wabash Building. Typically, more than 200 performances and events, ranging from dance and theater to music, educational programs, and more, attract over a quarter of a million people every year. The venue presents a wide array of international, national and Chicago-based dance and music programming. The signature program of the Auditorium's Creative Engagement department is "Hearts to Art", a summer camp that utilizes the performing arts of music, theatre and dance to provide healing opportunities for children who have experienced the death of a parent. Winner of State Farm Insurance's 2009 "Embrace Life" award, the camp helps the children gain self-confidence, learn to express themselves and fosters emotional growth through interaction with other campers and caring adults who have experienced the same loss.

On October 2, 2014, it was announced that the 2015 NFL draft would be held at the Auditorium Theatre, making the first selection meeting outside New York City in fifty years. The first round of the draft took place there on April 30, 2015. The draft ended after 7 rounds and 256 selections on May 2, 2015. The venue hosted the NFL draft again in 2016.

The Auditorium hosted the Joffrey Ballet from 1998 through 2019. The ballet company relocated to the Civic Opera House in 2021.

In late 2025, a major restoration project was announced with an anticipated completion date of fall 2027 that will restore the stained glass skylight and atrium and the Celtic stenciling on the atrium walls so as to realize the original design intentions of Adler and Sullivan.

== Architecture ==
The theatre featured many technological advancements for its time, including the display of 3,500 bare carbon filament light bulbs (only publicly seen for the first time in 1879), unrivaled acoustics, air conditioning (which called for the delivery of 15 tons of ice daily), 26 hydraulic lifts that could easily raise and lower sections of the stage, and an expansive 95-foot loft above the stage for flown scenic elements. Sullivan's vision for the theatre was to create a space that was democratic, where the best seats were not reserved for the wealthiest patrons, so the box seats were relocated to the sides, with an expansive main floor and generous balconies offering optimal sightlines to the general public. Ornamentation did not glorify a noble figure or mimic baroque palaces, but rather featured the artful interpretations of natural elements including flowers and vines, and bucolic murals. The Auditorium Theatre also exemplifies an architectural technique called "compression and expansion". Each patron was required to move through the small, dark entrance way into the theatre. The entrance was "compressed" by low ceilings in a way so that when patrons left the lobby to enter the theater, the impact of "expanding" into the towering six story auditorium, with its grand gilded arches and glittering ceiling, would be all the more dramatic.

=== Architectural schematics ===

Longitudinal Section, looking South

Basement Structure

9th Floor

Preceded by Radio City Music Hall	Venues of the NFL draft 2015 and 2016	Succeeded by Philadelphia City Hall
