= Buckingham Building =

Office skyscraper in Chicago, Illinois

- U.S. National Register of Historic Places
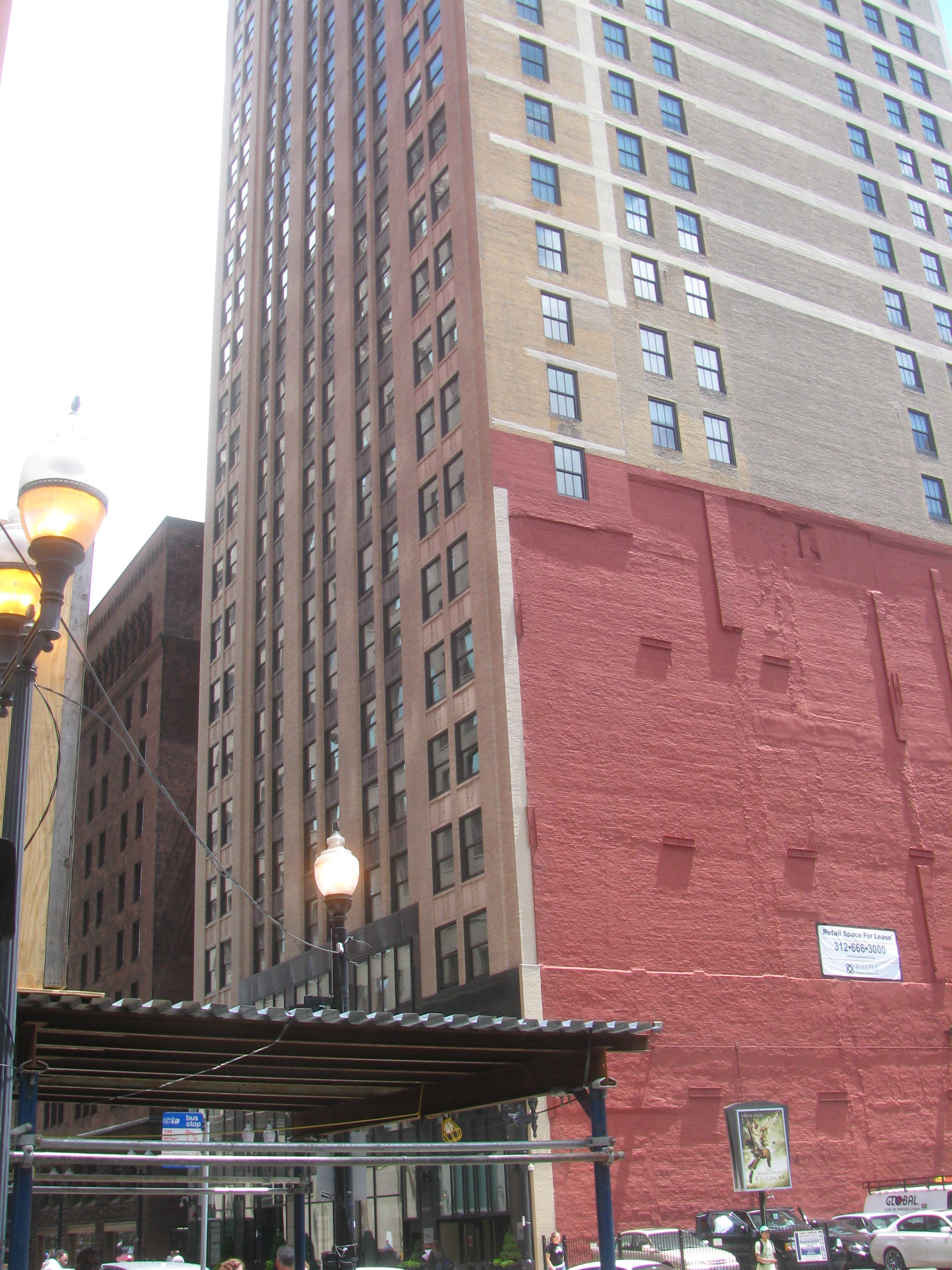

- Location within Chicago metropolitan area Location within Illinois Location within the United States
- Location: 59-67 E. Van Buren St., Chicago, Illinois
- Coordinates: 41°52′36″N 87°37′30″W
- Area: less than one acre
- Built: 1929–30
- Architect: Holabird & Root
- Architectural style: Art Deco
- NRHP reference No.: 00000942
- Added to NRHP: August 10, 2000

The Buckingham Building is a 27-story skyscraper located at 59-67 E. Van Buren St. in the Loop neighborhood of Chicago, Illinois. The building, which opened in 1930, has historically served as a mixed-use retail and office building. Chicago architects Holabird and Root designed the building in the Art Deco style. It was added to the National Register of Historic Places on August 10, 2000.

== History ==
Construction plans for the Buckingham Building began in 1929. The building replaced an 1886 structure called the Athenaeum Building, a semi-public educational institution. As a result, the new building was called the New Athenaeum during its initial planning, though by 1929 it was known as the Buckingham Building. The building's office space opened to tenants in May 1930; its leasing agents promoted the space using both its proximity to Michigan Avenue and multiple modes of transportation and its views of Lake Michigan and Grant Park. Significant early tenants of the building included the Vacuum Oil Company, the American Railroad Association, and the National Hardwood Lumber Association. The first floor of the building was used as retail space, housing shops and restaurants. The Vacuum Oil Company merged with the Standard Oil Company of New York in 1931 to become the Socony-Vacuum Company, and the consolidated firm rented increasingly more space in the building. By 1940, the firm renamed the building the Socony-Vacuum Building upon signing a ten-year lease to its office space. The building later became known by its street address. It still includes both retail and office space, though it is now only partially occupied.

== Architecture ==
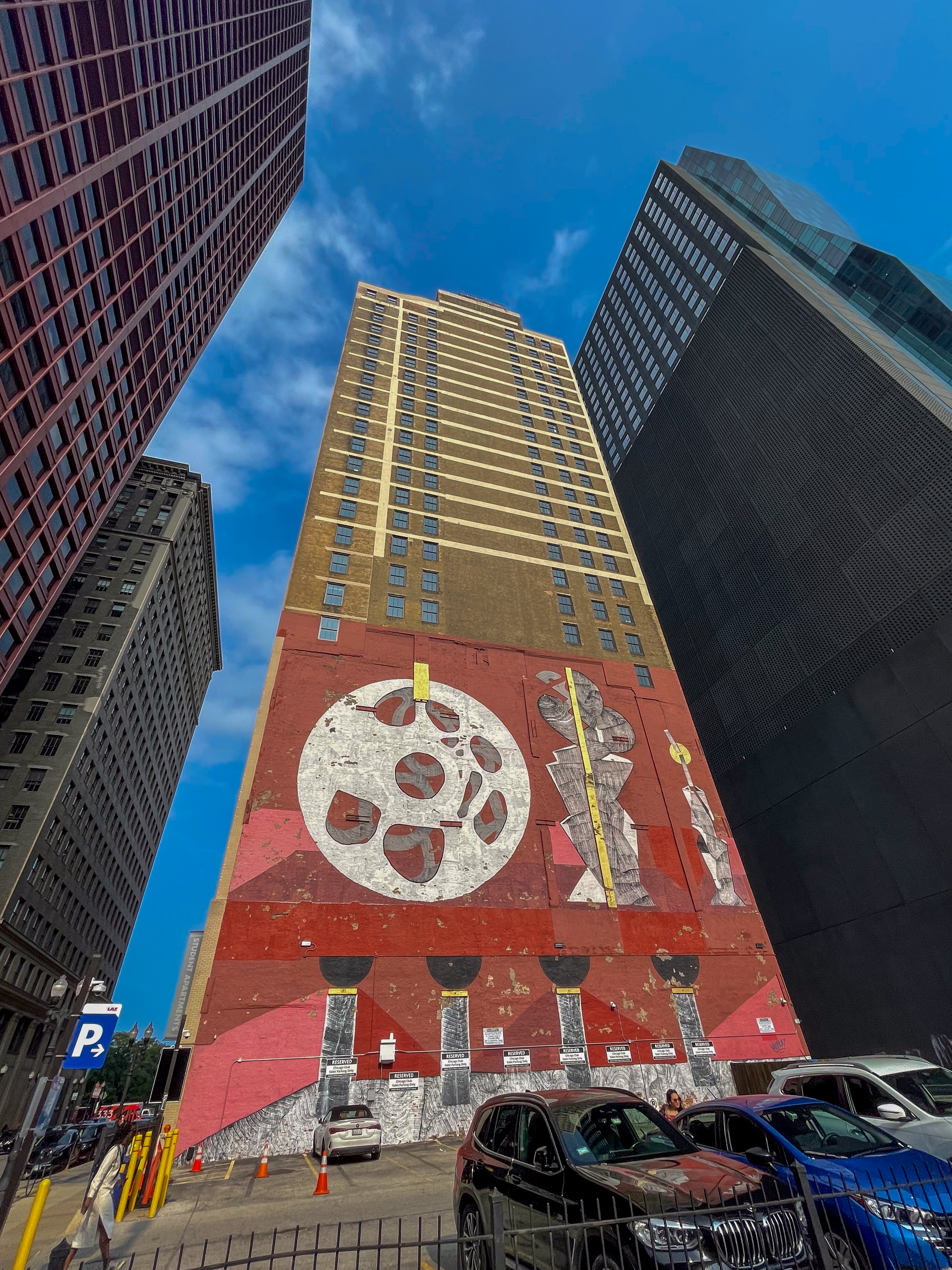
The building in 2024

Chicago architects Holabird and Root, the successors to Chicago school pioneers Holabird and Roche, designed the Buckingham Building. The firm designed the building in the Art Deco style. The building has a concrete and steel frame, and its exterior is faced in brick, granite, and terra cotta. The front facade is composed of five bays divided by piers; the three central bays are faced with dark terra cotta to add vertical emphasis to the lighter piers. Floral-patterned spandrels separate each story's windows on the central bays. The first three floors are faced in black granite, and the storefronts are framed by dentillated aluminum. The twenty-second floor features decorative chocolate-colored terra cotta panels with a floral design, while the twenty-fifth floor has additional terra cotta decorations with a keystone motif.
