= Ferdinand Peck =

American philanthropist (1848–1924)

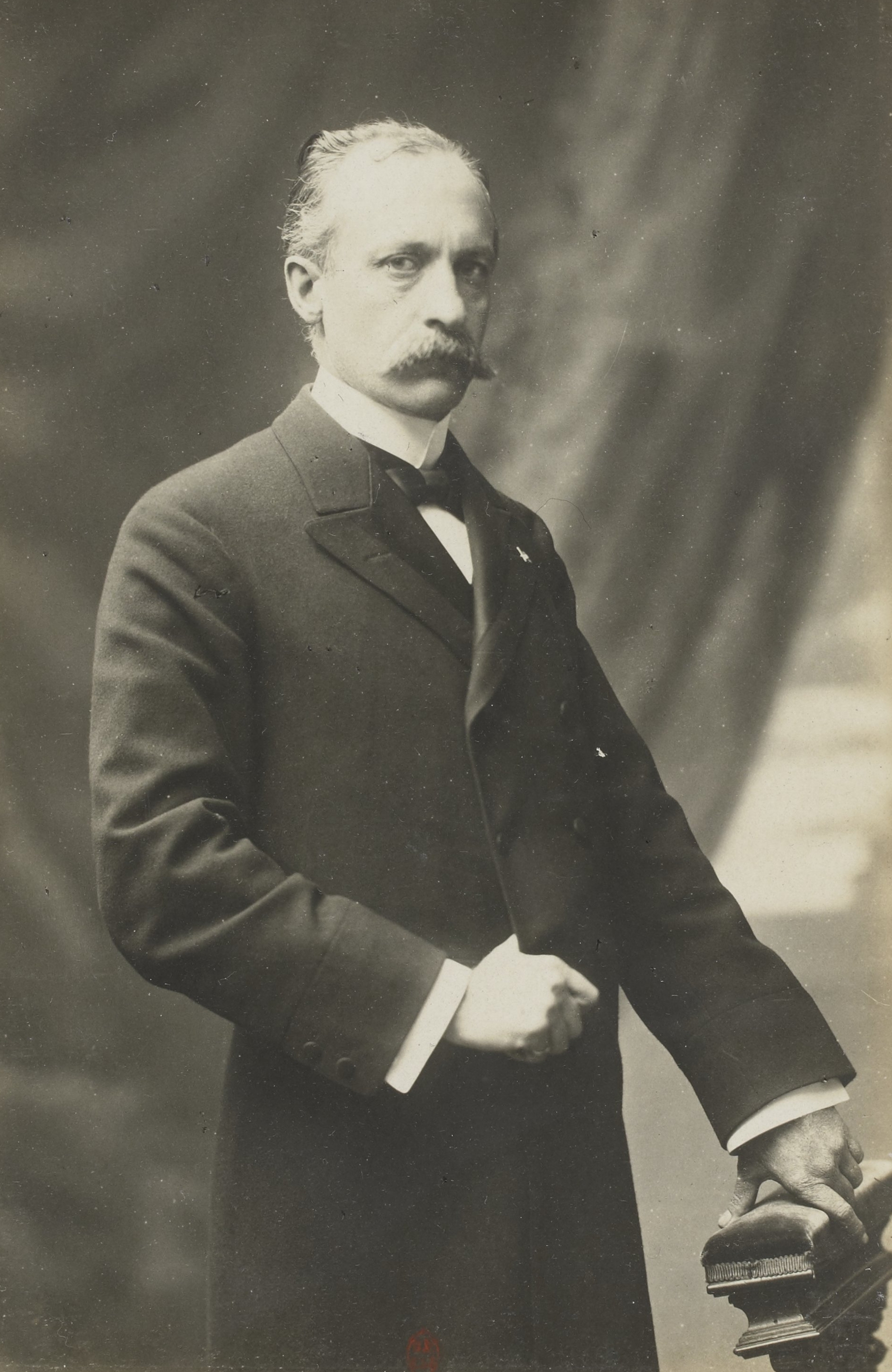
Ferdinand Wythe Peck at the Exposition Universelle (1900)

Ferdinand Wythe Peck (1848–1924) was a wealthy Chicago, Illinois, businessman and philanthropist, best known for financing Chicago's Auditorium Building.

He was the youngest son of Mary Kent Peck and Phillip F.W. Peck. The family moved from Rhode Island to Chicago in the 1830s and made a fortune in real estate. Peck and his brothers took over the family fortune when their father died, and soon were among the wealthiest families in Chicago.

Ferdinand was a civic-minded individual, and was involved in many projects around the city. He was a founding member of the Illinois humane society, and served on the city board of education. He was also a patron of the arts, particularly concerned with making high art available to the working classes. To this end, he organized the Chicago Grand Opera Festival in 1885.

Out of the Festival grew a desire for a more permanent expression of his ideals. Shortly after the Haymarket Square riot, he began planning in earnest for what would become the Auditorium Building. To make his idea real, Peck hired architects Dankmar Adler and Louis Sullivan, who had worked for him previously to prepare the space for the Grand Opera Festival. Peck provided some of the funding and the central vision for the building, and the final design reflected his ideas as well as those of the architects.

Peck served as the Commissioner-General for the United States at the Paris Exposition, 1900.

He died in Chicago on November 4, 1924, and was buried at Rosehill Cemetery.

An elementary school in southwest Chicago, at 3826 West 58th Street, is named after him.

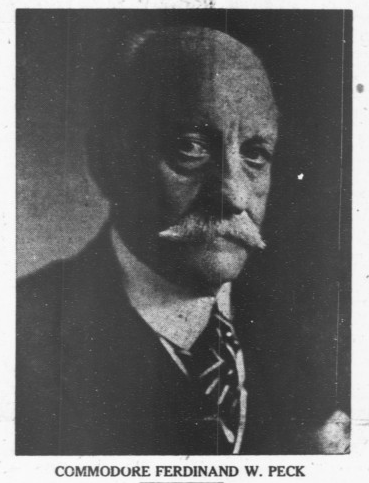
Ferdinand Peck, December 1921
