= List of architectural historians =

This is a list of architectural historians. The names are grouped by order of the historical period in which they were writing, which is not necessarily the same as the period in which they specialize.

== Born in the 19th century ==
- James Fergusson (architect) (1808–1886), South Asian Architecture
- Albrecht Rosengarten (1809-1893), author of A Handbook of Architectural Styles (German 1857; English translation 1894)
- Sir Alexander Cunningham (1814–1893), Indian architecture
- Sir Banister Fletcher (1866–1953), author of the once-standard textbook A History of Architecture on the Comparative Method written with his father, also named Bannister Fletcher (1833–1899) and still in print
- Juan Giuria (1880–1957), history of South American architecture
- Sigfried Giedion (1888-1958), 20th century architecture, author of Space, Time and Architecture
- Emil Kaufmann (1891-1953), neo-classicism architecture

== Born in the 20th century ==
- Herbert Ricke (1901–1976), head of the Swiss research institute on Egyptian architecture and archaeology in Cairo, specialist of ancient Egyptian architecture
- Liang Sicheng (1901–1972), father of Chinese architectural history
- Rudolf Wittkower (1901-1971), Italian Renaissance and Baroque architecture
- Nikolaus Pevsner (1902–1983), author of the 46-volume series, The Buildings of England
- Leopoldo C. Artucio (1903–1976), modern architecture in Uruguay
- Lin Huiyin (1904–1955), Chinese architectural history
- John Summerson (1904–1992), author of The Classical Language of Architecture and Architecture in Britain: 1530–1830
- Sarasi Kumar Saraswati (1906–1980), Bangladeshi historian of art and architecture
- John Harvey (1911–1997), English Gothic architecture and architects
- Bruno Zevi (1918-2000), modern architecture
- Reyner Banham (1922–1988), taught by Pevsner and author of Theory and Design in the First Machine Age (1960)
- Leonardo Benevolo (1923–2017), twentieth-century architecture
- Carolyn Pitts (1923–2008), American architectural history and preservation
- James S. Ackerman (1920–2016), Italian Renaissance architecture
- Ahmed Hasan Dani (1920–2009), South Asian Architecture
- César J. Loustau (1926–2011), architecture in Uruguay in the 19th and 20th centuries
- Kenneth Frampton (born 1930), twentieth-century architecture
- Yang Hongxun (1931–2016), Chinese architectural history and archaeology
- Liu Xianjue (1931–2019), Chinese architectural history and architectural heritage of Macau
- James Semple Kerr (1932–2014), Australian conservation architect and author of The Conservation Plan
- Stanford Anderson (1934–2016), modern architecture
- Manfredo Tafuri (1935-1994), Italian Renaissance architecture, 20th century
- Jennifer Taylor (1935–2015), Australian, Japanese and South Pacific architecture
- Charles Jencks (1939–2019), Postmodern Architecture
- Stephen Murray (historian), (born 1945) Romanesque and Gothic architecture
- Miles Ballantyne Lewis (born 1943) Australian academic specialising in building materials
- William J. R. Curtis (born 1948), twentieth-century architecture
- Michael D. Willis (born 1951), early temple architecture of central India
- Adam Hardy (born 1953), South Asian architecture
- Michael Dwyer (born 1954) American architecture, 19th and 20th century.
- Mark Jarzombek (born 1954) Professor of the history and theory of architecture, Massachusetts Institute of Technology
- Robert Jan van Pelt (born 1955), Dutch-Canadian author, Holocaust scholar and Professor of Cultural History at the University of Waterloo, Canada
- Elain Harwood (1958–2023), a specialist in post–Second World War English architecture
- Jonathan Hill (1958–2023), Professor of Architecture and Visual Theory at University College London, England
- Karen Burns (born 1962), historian of nineteenth-century architecture and twentieth-century architecture
- Graeme Butler, architectural historian and heritage practitioner
- Harriet Edquist twentieth-century architecture
- Aurelio Lucchini (died 1989), Uruguayan architecture
- Michael W. Meister, temple architecture and the morphology of meaning of the Indian sub-continent
- Soumyen Bandyopadhyay, architecture of Oman

== See also ==
- Historiography
- History
- Historian
- Outline of architecture
