= Zahiri (disambiguation) =

Ẓāhirī is a school of thought in Islamic jurisprudence.

Zahiri may also refer to:

== Places ==
- Zahiri, Iran, a village in Khuzestan Province, Iran
- Zehiriyeh, a village in Khuzestan Province, Iran

== People ==
- al-Andalusī aẓ-Ẓāhirī, alias Ibn Hazm, 10th-century Andalusian philosopher, litterateur, psychologist, historian, jurist and theologian
- Zahir-al-Din Fariyabi, 12th-century Persian poet
- Jamel Zahiri (born 1985), French-born Moroccan football forward
- Mohamed Obaid Al-Zahiri, football player from the United Arab Emirates
