= Jamel =

Jamel may refer to:

== Given name ==
- Jamel Akbar (born 1954), Saudi architect, educator, and theorist
- Jamel Artis (born 1993), American basketball player
- Jamel Ashley (born 1979), American athlete
- Jamel Brinkley, American writer
- Jamel Chatbi (born 1984), Moroccan-Italian athlete
- Jamel Chisholm (born 1995), Jamaican rugby league footballer
- Jamel Dean (born 1996), American football player
- Jamel Debbouze (born 1975), French actor
- Jamel Eddine Gharbi (born 1964), Tunisian politician
- Jamel Herring (born 1985), American boxer
- Jamel Holley (born 1979), American politician
- Jamel Aït Ben Idir (born 1984) French-Moroccan footballer
- Jamel Johnson (born 1991), American football player
- Jamel Johnson (defensive back) (born 2003), American football player
- Jamel James Johnson (born 1990), American-Jamaican footballer
- Jamel McLean (born 1988), American basketball player
- Jamel Mitchell (born 1975), American footballer
- Jamel Morris (born 1992), American basketball player
- Jamel Ramsay (born 1986), American football coach and athletic director
- Jamel Richardson (born 1982), American football player
- Jamel Saihi (born 1987), Tunisian-French footballer
- Jamel K. Semper (born 1981), American lawyer
- Jamel Shabazz (born 1960), American photographer
- Jamel Thomas (born 1976), American basketball player
- Jamel Wallace (born 1987), American footballer
- Jamel White (born 1978), American football player
- Jamel Williams (born 1973), American football player
- Jamel Wright, American academic administrator
- Jamel Zabi (born 1975), Tunisian footballer
- Jamel Zahiri (born 1985), French-Moroccan footballer

== Places ==
- Jamel, Tunisia, a city in Tunisia
- Jamel, Germany, a village in Germany
