= Bayard–Condict Building =

Office building in Manhattan, New York

- U.S. National Register of Historic Places
- U.S. National Historic Landmark
- New York State Register of Historic Places
- New York City Landmark
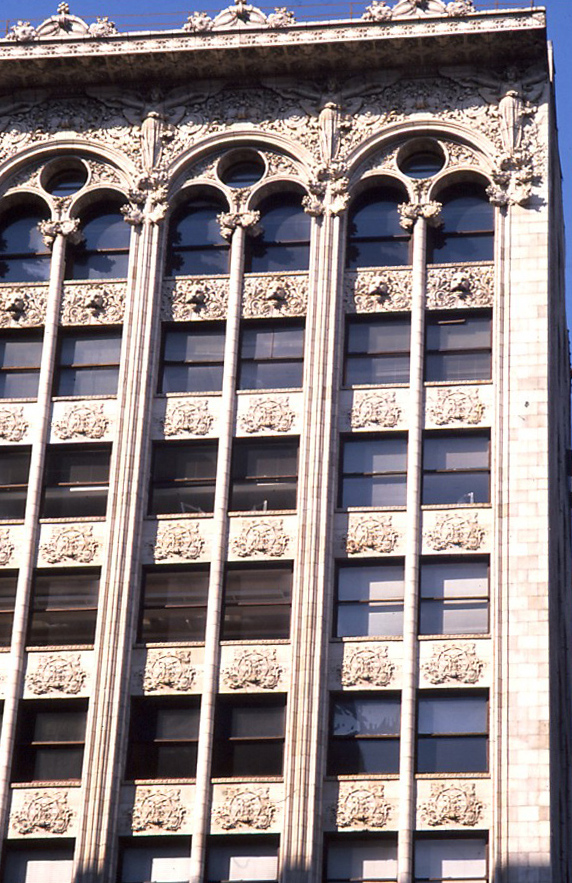

- Location within Manhattan Location within New York City Location within New York Location within the United States
- Interactive map of Bayard–Condict Building
- Location: 65 Bleecker Street; Manhattan, New York
- Coordinates: 40°43′35″N 73°59′42″W
- Built: 1899
- Architect: Louis Sullivan
- Architectural style: Chicago School
- NRHP reference No.: 76001236
- NYSRHP No.: 06101.001674
- NYCL No.: 0882

Significant dates
- Added to NRHP: December 8, 1976
- Designated NHL: December 8, 1976
- Designated NYSRHP: June 23, 1980
- Designated NYCL: November 25, 1975

The Bayard–Condict Building (formerly the Condict Building and Bayard Building) is a 12-story commercial structure at 65 Bleecker Street in the NoHo neighborhood of Manhattan, New York City, United States. Built between 1897 and 1899 in the Chicago School style, it was the only building in New York City designed by architect Louis Sullivan, who worked on the project alongside Lyndon P. Smith. Located in the NoHo Historic District, the building was designated a New York City landmark in 1975 and a National Historic Landmark in 1976.

The building occupies a rectangular site and has a terracotta facade divided horizontally into three sections. The lower two stories consist of ground-story storefronts with ornate columns, with an arched entrance in the westernmost bay. On the upper stories, piers separate the building vertically into five bays, each with ornate spandrel panels. There are six winged angels just below the cornice at the top of the building. On the inside, the first two stories are used for retail, while the upper floors generally contain large loft-like spaces and a steel structural frame. A mechanical core with elevators, utilities, and stairs is in its western end.

The Bayard Building was developed by the United Loan and Investment Company, who acquired the land in 1897 from the Bank for Savings in the City of New York and named the edifice after the Bayard family. Due to disputes over construction methods, United Loan was forced to give up the building before it was completed, and Emmeline G. H. Condict had acquired it by June 1899. It was sold in 1900, and again in 1920, before coming under the control of the Shulsky family in the 1940s. The storefronts were replaced in the 1960s, followed by the lobby in the 1980s. The facade was restored during the late 1990s and early 2000s.

== Site ==
The Bayard–Condict Building is at 65 Bleecker Street in the NoHo neighborhood of Manhattan, New York City, United States. It is on the north side of Bleecker Street between Broadway and Lafayette Street, at the northern end of Crosby Street. The land lot is rectangular and measures around 8,330 square feet (774 m^{2}), with a frontage of 83.3 feet (25.4 m) and a depth of 100 feet (30 m) along Bleecker Street. The Robbins & Appleton Building adjoins the Bayard–Condict Building on the same block directly to the north, and an entrance to the New York City Subway's Bleecker Street station is immediately to the east. Other nearby structures include the Schermerhorn Building to the northeast, 339 Lafayette Street to the east, and 640 Broadway to the southwest.

Before the early 19th century, what is now NoHo was part of the farms of numerous families, such as the Bayard, Bleecker, Herring, Pero, and Randall families. West–east streets were laid through the area by the early 19th century, and row houses were built along these streets. This was followed by institutions like churches, libraries, and schools in the 1830s and 1840s, then by store and loft buildings in the 1850s, which catered to the area's wealthy population. With the advent of curtain walls, steel frames, and fireproof elevators, these store and loft buildings were being built as tall as 12 stories by the 1890s. The Bayard–Condict Building was among these early high-rise loft buildings.

== Architecture ==
The Bayard–Condict Building is the only structure in New York City designed by Louis H. Sullivan, a Chicago school architect, as well as his first completed design after his partnership with Dankmar Adler dissolved in 1896. It is also one of two Sullivan designs remaining in New York state, aside from the Guaranty Building in Buffalo, New York. Sullivan is sometimes cited as the building's sole architect, although he was assisted by New York architect Lyndon P. Smith. Sullivan, who was only licensed to practice architecture in Illinois, frequently formed such partnerships with local architects when he took out-of-state commissions. George Grant Elmslie helped design the decorations.

The building was one of the first skeleton frame skyscrapers in New York City, and the Department of Buildings raised numerous objections to the design before the plans were finally accepted. Measuring 162 feet (49 m) tall, with 13 stories, it was considered an early skyscraper. It was similar in design to an unbuilt skyscraper for the St. Louis Trust and Savings Bank that was designed in 1895. According to Sullivan's protege Frank Lloyd Wright, the Bayard–Condict Building was Sullivan's favorite design. The Bayard–Condict Building's architecture inspired the design of other structures, including a nearby office building in SoHo designed by Marcello Porcelli and Cookfox during the 2010s.

=== Exterior ===
Ground view

The Bleecker Street elevation of the facade is clad in white glazed terracotta over a masonry wall. The facade has relatively undecorated mullions and pilasters, which accentuate its height and divide the facade vertically into five bays. The Bleecker Street facade is divided horizontally into three sections—an ornamented base, a shaft of identical stacked floors, and a decorated crown—illustrating Sullivan's views on skyscraper design. The terracotta, made by the Northwest Terracotta Company, was deliberately constructed in thin layers, visually emphasizing the columns in the building's superstructure.

Whereas the protruding mullions and pilasters were intended to draw attention to the superstructure, the superstructure's horizontal beams were deemphasized and covered with wide spandrel panels. Architectural critic Herbert Muschamp wrote that the emphasis of the vertical elements may have been intended to represent "maximum development of a small urban site by thrusting against gravitational force". Sullivan's ornate floral designs decorate the facade's base and top, as well as the spandrels below each window opening. The facade's other three elevations are made of red brick on common bond. At the rear are light courts overlooking an alley.

==== Lower stories ====
The lowest part of the Bleecker Street facade contains a concrete water table. The entrance to the building is through the westernmost bay. The doorway is flanked by piers, above which are a small cornice and an ornamented lunette with "organic" motifs such as spirals, leaves and tendrils. The lunette is topped by geometric designs and leaves. The base of the building originally contained storefronts separated by octagonal columns, above which were ornate capitals that also depicted leaves. The original columns were removed in 1964 and restored in 2002. Above each of the ground-story storefronts are spandrel panels with more organic motifs. These storefronts resemble the Trust and Savings design closely, with slanting clerestory windows. To give the impression that the building's base was two stories high, Sullivan did not use mullions and pilasters on the lowest two stories.

==== Upper stories ====
On the upper stories, the bays are separated by pilasters, which correspond to the internal structural system; each bay is topped by a large arch. Above the second floor, the bays are further subdivided into two sash windows per story, separated by a narrow mullion. The windows between the mullions and pilasters are 65 inches (1,700 mm) wide, nearly filling their respective sub-bays. The pilasters and mullions created contrasting narrow and wide vertical elements—a design technique Sullivan had previously used in the Guaranty Building in Buffalo, New York, and the Wainwright Building in St. Louis, Missouri. There are recessed terracotta spandrels with geometric and organic motifs above the pairs of windows on each story. The spandrels above the 11th floor are decorated with lions' heads.

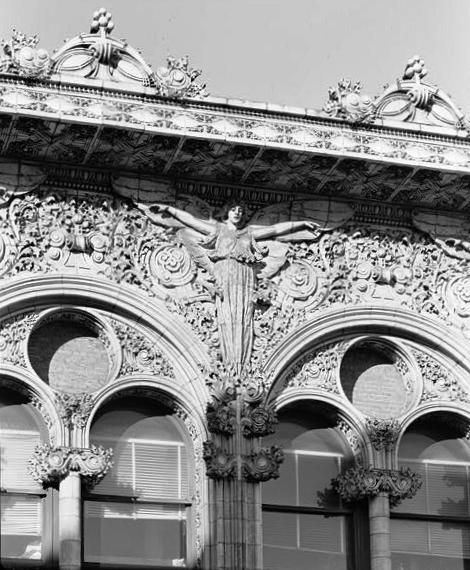
Detail of the 13th story, with small arches topped by round porthole windows beneath the larger arches. The parapet sculptural details can be seen above.

The top two stories (the 12th and 13th) were intended to resemble a single story from the outside. On these stories, each bay contains an arch at the 12th and 13th stories, and there is a trefoil motif in the spandrels of each arch. The arch itself includes smaller arches between each pilaster and mullion, topped by porthole windows that sit beneath the larger arches. A heavy cornice projects from the facade above the thirteenth floor and contains decorative soffit panels. There are round motifs and leaves above the cornice, but the roof of the building is otherwise flat.

There are six winged angels just below the cornice. For many years, it was widely believed that Silas Alden Condict, a lawyer with religious aspirations who had briefly owned the building, had wanted the angels to be included. Condict allegedly wanted the angels to represent the six working days of the week (excluding the Sabbath). Sullivan had allegedly initially objected to the presence of the angels; according to The New York Times, Sullivan had asked Condict, "Do you want a commercial building or do you want a church?" Condict's role in the angels' inclusion is disputed by historians Sarah Landau and Carl W. Condit, who wrote in their 1996 book Rise of the New York Skyscraper that Sullivan had used winged-angel motifs in his design for the Transportation Building at the 1893 World's Columbian Exposition. Menocal wrote that the architect had previously used similar angels on the Trust and Savings Bank and that these were, in turn, similar to those of the Reims Cathedral. The sculptures had been depicted in a Brickbuilder magazine article in June 1898, before the Condict family had even bought the building.

=== Interior ===
According to the Architectural Review, the Bayard–Condict Building was a speculative development "designed to be used for offices or light manufactures as to the upper storeys, and for shops in the ground and first floors". When the Bayard–Condict Building was built, the ground story had two shops and an entrance. It generally contained large loft-like spaces on the upper stories. The lofts could be divided into smaller offices and were illuminated by natural light, which was maximized by the presence of setbacks at the rear of the building. There was also a mechanical core with elevators, utilities, and stairs.

Originally, the building was to contain brick curtain walls with a uniform thickness of 12 inches (300 mm). The interior would have been supported by a type of freestanding steel frame called the Gray system, which used 14-by-14-inch (360 by 360 mm) columns attached to cast-steel bases. Sullivan and Dankmar Adler had previously used the Gray system at the Guaranty Building, but New York City officials were loath to approve the use of the Gray system. As a result, the curtain wall measured 20 inches (510 mm) thick between the floor slabs for the first and fifth stories; 16 inches (410 mm) thick between the fifth and ninth stories; and 12 inches (300 mm) thick above the ninth story. The interior columns were also thickened, measuring between 24 inches (610 mm) across at the ground story and 13 inches (330 mm) across on the top two stories.

By the late 20th century, the building was accessed through the westernmost bay on Bleecker Street, which led to a north–south hallway. The hallway had terrazzo floors, plastic wall tiles, and acoustical ceiling tiles. A pair of elevators was positioned at the center of the hallway, while the rear end of the hallway had a stairway adjacent to a storefront. The staircase had an ornate balustrade between the basement and third story, stucco-and-plaster walls, and a plaster ceiling. On the upper stories, there was a hallway on the western end of each story connecting to the elevators and stair. The remainder of each story was divided into office or industrial space, with tile floors, plaster walls, and plaster ceilings. Ceiling heights range from 15 feet (4.6 m) on the first floor to 9.5 feet (2.9 m) on the 12th floor. (Note: The ceiling heights are: 1st floor: 15 ft (4.6 m); 2nd floor: 13 ft (4.0 m); 3rd floor: 12 ft (3.7 m); 4th and 5th floors: 11 ft (3.4 m); 6th to 11th floors: 10 ft (3.0 m); 12th floor: 9.5 ft (2.9 m); 13th floor: 14.5 ft (4.4 m)) The 13th floor functions as a gallery level surrounding a double-height space on the 12th story.

== History ==
The Bayard–Condict Building was constructed on the former site of the Bank for Savings in the City of New York, also known as the Old Bleecker Street Bank. The bank building on the site burned down in 1895. The bank itself relocated to Fourth Avenue in the late 19th century.

=== Development ===
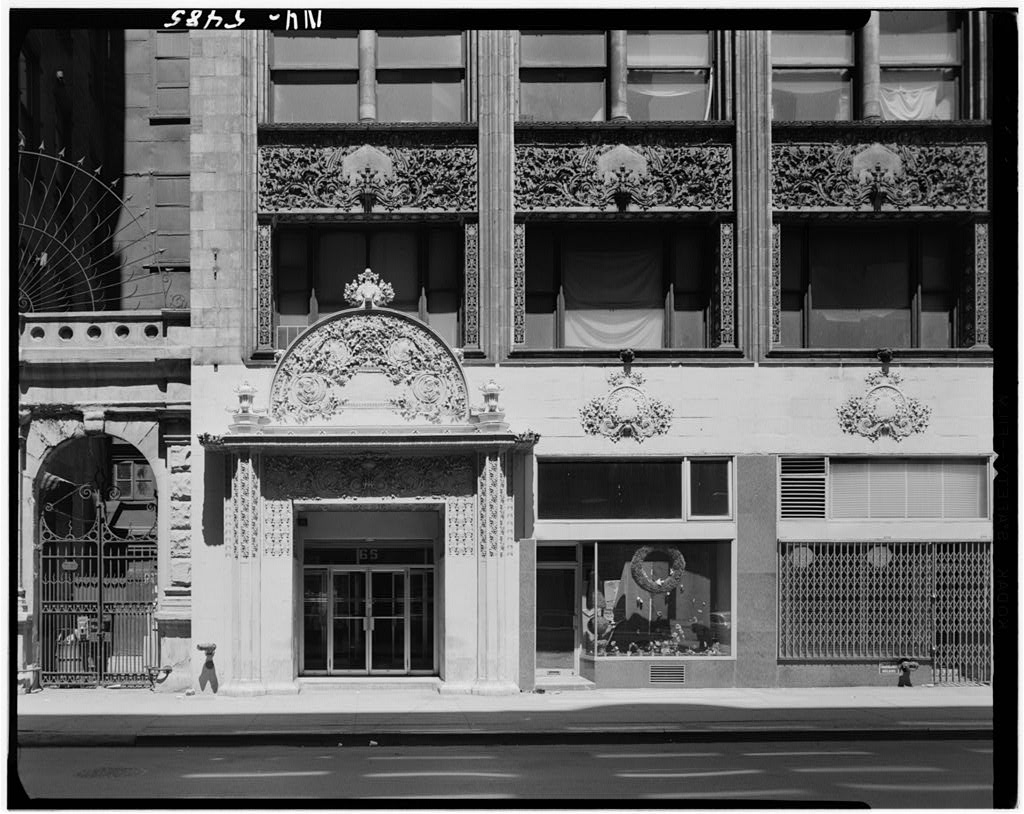
Entry and lower facade as depicted in the Historic American Buildings Survey

The United Loan and Investment Company had been incorporated in 1895 to sell securities, land, and mortgages for a commission; it was authorized to trade real estate in 1897. That September, United Loan acquired an 83.6-by-100-foot (25.5 by 30.5 m) site on the north side of Bleecker Street from the Bank for Savings. The site reportedly cost $200,000, (Note: Equivalent to $6.6 million in 2025) most of which was covered by a $150,000 mortgage from the Bank of Savings, (Note: Equivalent to $5.0 million in 2025) which was to come due in three years. United Loan immediately announced plans to erect the 12-story Bayard Building at a cost of $100,000. (Note: Equivalent to $3.3 million in 2025) The edifice was to be named after the Bayard family, an early settler of the colony of New Netherland, whose area included modern-day New York. Although the family was not involved with the project, Landau and Condit wrote that the structure directly referenced William Bayard Jr., the Bank for Savings' first president.

Louis Sullivan, working with Lyndon P. Smith of New York, was hired to design the structure. It is unknown how or why United Loan and Investment selected Sullivan to design the building. Historian Robert Twombly suggested that Smith's recommendation, an essay by Montgomery Schuyler, or the opening of Buffalo's Guaranty Building may have played a role. Conversely, historian Timothy Samuelson said that United Loan's president Robert Avery consulted a Chicago real-estate consultant, who advised him to hire Sullivan. At the time of the building's development in the late 1890s, New York City's most prominent structures were generally designed by local firms such as McKim, Mead & White.

The partnership of Sullivan & Smith submitted plans for a 12-story structure at 65–69 Bleecker Street (Note: Some sources, such as the Chicago Tribune, described the building as "150 feet east of Broadway".) to the New York City Department of Buildings on September 17, 1897, and The New York Times announced these plans on September 23. The building was to be a fireproof structure with a terracotta facade and would contain numerous elevators. The New York Times estimated the building would cost $400,000, (Note: Equivalent to $13.3 million in 2025) while the Chicago Daily Tribune and historian Robert Twombly cited a cost of $275,000. (Note: Equivalent to $9.1 million in 2025) According to trade publication The Construction News, the building was to cost between $250,000 and $275,000. (Note: Equivalent to $8.3–9.1 million in 2025) After disputes over various aspects of the planned building were resolved, United Loan began erecting the Bayard Building in December 1897. The Bayard Building was one of four major buildings Sullivan was constructing at the time, along with the Schlesinger & Mayer's, Gage Brothers, and Crane buildings. Income from the building's construction enabled Sullivan to pay off creditors.

=== Early years ===
Before the building was completed, the Bank for Savings initiated foreclosure proceedings on the property in December 1898. In April 1899, Charles W. Rice of the Perth Amboy Terra Cotta Company acquired the building at a foreclosure auction for $327,000, (Note: Equivalent to $10.7 million in 2025) wiping out United Loan's investment in the structure. Rice had been one of the building's material contractors, and he had purchased the building to satisfy $150,000 in liens. (Note: Equivalent to $5.0 million in 2025) Emmeline G. H. Condict bought the building in June 1899 from Chase Mellen for $37,000, (Note: Equivalent to $1.2 million in 2025) taking out a $310,000 mortgage on the property. (Note: Equivalent to $10.1 million in 2025)

The building was completed in December 1899, and Sullivan never again designed another building in New York City. The Blue Guide New York said Sullivan had a hard time getting the Bayard Building to meet the city's building codes, while Carl Condit stated that the building's remote location on Bleecker Street may have been a factor. Christopher Gray wrote that the foreclosure auction may have been a factor in Sullivan's inability to receive another New York City commission, since United Loan had been the architect's only client in the city. More broadly, Sullivan received few major commissions of any type in the 20th century; after the Bayard–Condict, Schlesinger & Mayer's, and Gage commissions were completed, Sullivan was hired exclusively for smaller works such as the Van Allen Building and jewel box banks.

Sources disagree on the Bayard–Condict Building's original name. Landau and Condit described the structure as being known as the "Bayard Building" when it was completed, while the New York City Landmarks Preservation Commission (LPC) said that it was already known as the "Condict Building" when it opened in December 1899. Twombly said the building was "forever known as the Bayard-Condict" ever since Emmeline bought the structure. A 1901 directory listed the Bayard Building as an office building at 65–67 Bleecker Street, adjacent to another office building, the Condict Building at 69 Bleecker Street. A 1900 New York Times article identified 65–67 Bleecker Street as the Condict Building, while the Brooklyn Times Union described the Condict Building as occupying "65, 67 and 69 Bleecker Street".

=== 1900s to 1980s ===
Detail of second and third stories

The tenth floor was severely damaged in a fire in March 1900, and the Condict family sold the building that May to its builder, Charles T. Wills. In its early years, the Condict Building operated as a commercial loft structure, and Lyndon Smith had his offices there. The Wills estate continued to own the Condict Building until January 1920, when the estate sold the building to Heidelberg, Wolff & Co. for $450,000. (Note: Equivalent to $5.5 million in 2025) Elgin Shulsky acquired the building during the 1940s.

During the late 1940s, the capitals above the columns at ground level were covered with plaster and cinder blocks. This blunted the effect of Sullivan's original storefronts, which had been designed as full-height glass panels between small columns. The popularity of ornate facades, such as that of the Condict Building, had declined significantly by the late 1950s, prompting the Municipal Art Society to select the building as one of several in the city that were "worthy of preservation". Elgin Shulsky replaced the original storefronts with generic commercial aluminum storefronts, designed by Gustave W. Iser, in 1964. The neighborhood was largely occupied at the time by warehousing and light manufacturing firms. One of the original capitals was preserved in the Brooklyn Museum, while a group led by Ivan Karp obtained another capital for the collection of the Anonymous Arts Museum. The capital in the Brooklyn Museum's collection became part of a sculpture garden.

The LPC first hosted a public hearing on whether to designate the building as a city landmark in 1966, but the structure was not designated because the owners objected to it. The LPC hosted further hearings in 1970, 1974, and 1975 before it designated the Bayard–Condict Building as a city landmark on November 25, 1975. The LPC designated the Bayard–Condict Building largely on the grounds that it was Sullivan's only New York City building. The Shulsky family immediately sued the LPC, claiming that "the vast majority of the population in the City of New York and the United States of America have no knowledge whatsoever" of the building's existence, but the lawsuit stalled. The building's owners also objected when preservationist Carolyn Pitts nominated the building for National Historic Landmark (NHL) designation the next year. Despite the owners' claim that the building was "run-down" and "undistinguished", Pitts surreptitiously created a report on the building and submitted it to the United States Department of the Interior, which approved the nomination the same year. It was one of several buildings by Sullivan (either alone or as part of Adler & Sullivan) to be granted NHL designation. (Note: Adler & Sullivan's Auditorium Building, Wainwright Building, Guaranty Building, and James Charnley House are also designated as NHLs. National Historic Landmarks designed by Sullivan alone include the Carson Pirie Scott Building, Harold C. Bradley House, Farmers and Merchants Union Bank, Merchants' National Bank, National Farmers' Bank of Owatonna, People's Federal Savings and Loan Association, and Van Allen Building.)

The building continued to be largely occupied by commercial tenants through the late 20th century. By the early 1980s, the Shulsky family was replacing the industrial tenants with office tenants, as the owners wished to refurbish the building. Among the tenants who moved out was the building's largest occupant, a company specializing in ribbons and artificial flowers. The vacant space was rented to office tenants for as low as $8 per square foot ($86/m^{2}). Subsequently, the Shulsky family renovated the lobby to designs by Edgar Tafel, whose mentor Frank Lloyd Wright had studied under Sullivan. Elgin Shulsky's son Marvin Shulsky took over the building's management in the 1980s.

=== 1990s to present ===
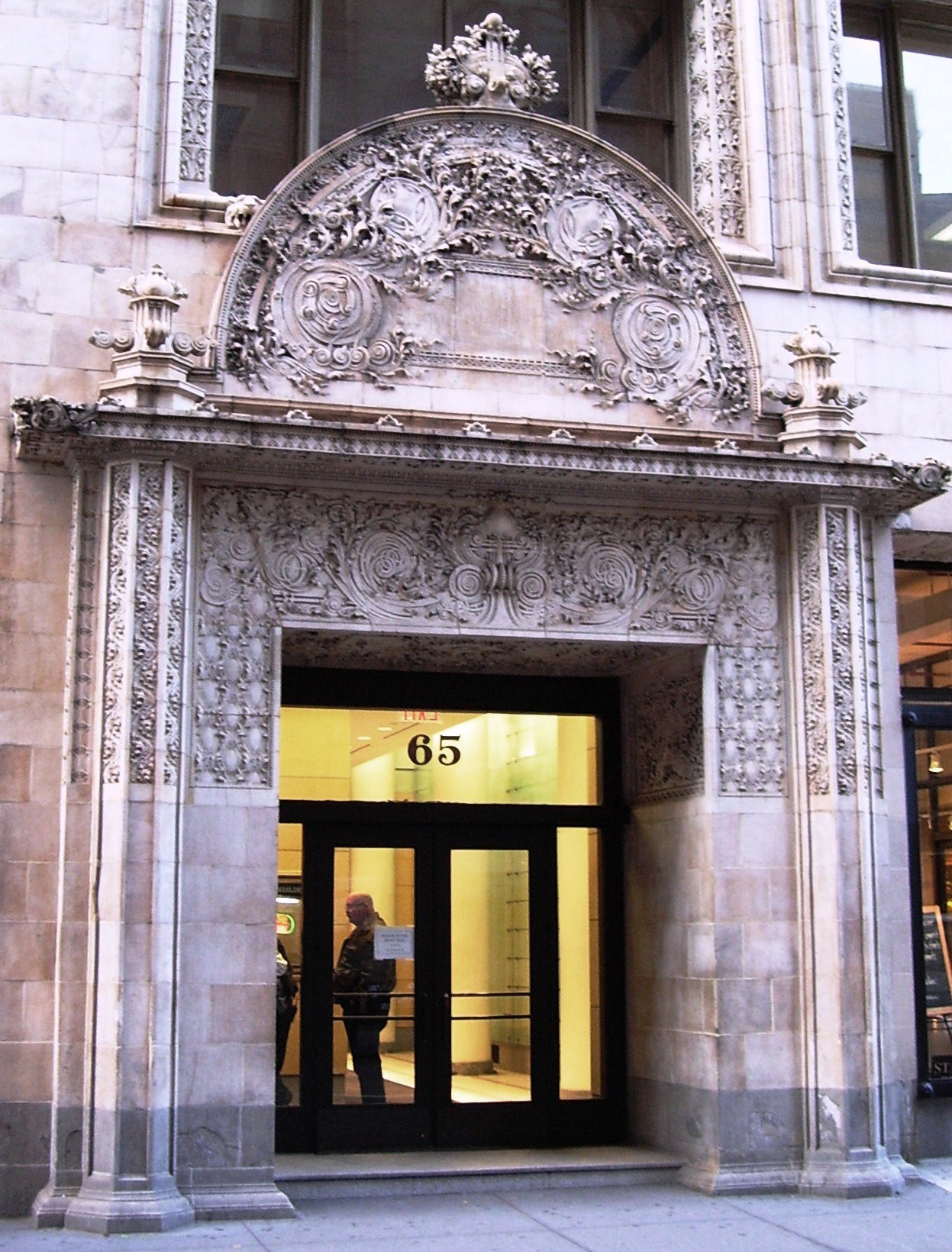
Entrance (2010)

In 1996, New York City-based architecture and engineering firm Wank Adams Slavin Associates designed and oversaw a restoration of the Bayard–Condict Building's facade. The project cost $800,000. Of the 7,000 glazed architectural terracotta pieces, about 1,200 had to be repaired, including 30 that were fully replaced. To repair the iron anchors behind the terracotta tiles, Wank Adams Slavin devised a method to carefully remove the terracotta using a drill typically utilized for underground excavations. Marvin Shulsky said at the time: "I figured I had a choice: cover the whole thing in $10's and $20's or redo the terra cotta." Replicas of the original capitals at ground level, modeled after the capital in the Anonymous Arts Museum's collection, were installed.

The LPC designated the building as part of the NoHo Historic District in June 1999. At the time, individual sites such as the Bayard–Condict Building and the Public Theater Building were designated as landmarks, but preservationists wanted the entire neighborhood to be preserved. By then, the building was nearly fully occupied by tenants such as the Andy Warhol Foundation for the Visual Arts, Carl Fischer Music, the literary agency of Sterling Lord, cosmetics firm The Estée Lauder Companies, and USA Films. The restoration was completed by 2002, and the Greenwich Village Society for Historic Preservation gave its Village Award in 2003 to the restoration contractors.

By 2013, Marvin Shulsky's son-in-law Lawrence Ellenberg had taken over the building and was adding an elevator. During the early 21st century, the building's tenants included the Council of Fashion Designers of America, a law firm, and an ice cream shop.

== Reception ==
When the Bayard–Condict Building was completed, it was a radical design for its time, since it shunned the American Renaissance elements commonplace to contemporary American architecture. It nonetheless had little influence on architectural design in New York City, because of its location in the industrial area that Bleecker Street was during that period. Russell Sturgis said the structure "exemplifies the growth of modern American building connected with the steel cage construction", saying that the design was clearly intended to be that of a skyscraper, and that the design had been carefully thought out. Montgomery Schuyler wrote: "There is nothing capricious in the general treatment of this structure. It is an attempt, and a very serious attempt, to found the architecture of a tall building upon the facts of the case." French writer Jean Schopfer perceived the Bayard–Condict Building as "the best skyscraper yet erected". A reporter for The Wall Street Journal wrote that, following the building's completion, the public saw Louis Sullivan "as the architect who had solved the problem of what to do with the skyscraper". Sullivan himself felt the building was "his most satisfactory skyscraper".

In the late 20th century, art historian Vincent Scully repeated Sullivan's sentiment that the Bayard–Condict Building had been Sullivan's best design, and Ada Louise Huxtable called it "still handsome, though partially disfigured". A reporter for the New York Daily News described the Bayard–Condict Building in 1964 as having "the appearance of a large commercial structure from the 1897–98 period". The same year, the Times said the building "is still in every important textbook of the American skyscraper". In designating the Bayard–Condict Building as a city landmark in 1975, the LPC wrote that the structure was "the most significant commercial building utilizing skyscraper structural techniques in New York City". Paul Goldberger described the Bayard–Condict Building's cornice in 1976 as "perhaps the finest cornice in all of New York". In his 1994 book New York, a Guide to the Metropolis, Gerard Wolfe wrote that the Bayard–Condict Building was a "startlingly ornate" structure that was tucked onto a side street. Among Sullivan's biographers, Hugh Morrison called the building "a prophetic apparition in New York" because it combined elaborate decoration and high-rise construction, and Narciso Menocal said the facade's decorations created a rhythmic pattern.

The building also received positive commentary after its renovation in the 1990s and 2000s. Carter Wiseman, writing for American Heritage magazine, said in 1998 that the building's "lightness and elegance are immediately evident to the determined observer", praising the alternation of narrow and wide piers. Herbert Muschamp said in 2001 that the building "stands as a reminder that private clients, including developers, were once more eager than the cultural organizations to embrace progressive ideals". A 2003 Miami Herald article described the Bayard–Condict Building as "massive and delicate", while the Chicago Tribune wrote that the building was "a study in terra-cotta ornamentation". The architect Chad Smith wrote for the Village Voice in 2005: "It is new because it is modern—both for its forward-looking design and because it was (and is) an innovative solution to 19th-century problems. It feels fresh because it is still so completely a building of its age."

== See also ==
- List of National Historic Landmarks in New York City
- List of New York City Designated Landmarks in Manhattan below 14th Street
- National Register of Historic Places listings in Manhattan below 14th Street
