= James Semple Kerr =

Australian architectural historian

James Semple Kerr AM
- Born: 6 July 1932; Rockhampton, Queensland
- Died: 15 October 2014 (aged 82); Willoughby, New South Wales
- Occupation: Architectural historian
- Known for: The Conservation Plan

James Semple Kerr AM (6 July 1932 – 15 October 2014) was an architectural historian and heritage practitioner in Australia, who was prominent in the drafting of the original Burra Charter and its subsidiary documents, and developing standards for conservation practice, particularly in relation to conservation assessments and management reports such as conservation management plans. Kerr's influence in the conservation movement is most notable for his publication of the Conservation Plan, which has guided building conservation in Australia and around the world.

== Work and contributions ==
Kerr undertook a doctorate at the Institute of Advanced Architectural Studies, at the University of York in 1974. He graduated in 1977 with a PhD titled Design for convicts in the Australian colonies during the transportation era. In 1978 he took up the position as assistant director at the Australian Heritage Commission in Canberra. He was also an assistant director of the National Trust of Australia (NSW).

Kerr was prominent in heritage conservation in Australia for over 40 years and was an early member of Australia ICOMOS, taking a major role in the formulation of the Burra Charter and its Guidelines. His publication in 1982 of The Conservation Plan: A guide to the preparation of conservation plans for places of European cultural significance was a landmark in Australian conservation. The Conservation Plan is widely used by heritage practitioners and property owners in Australia, and worldwide as a primary guide to the process of researching, documenting and managing historic places in accordance with the Burra Charter, through a logical process. First published by the National Trust of Australia (NSW) in 1982, it has subsequently been reprinted in expanded form over seven editions and twelve printing impressions. The concept has been adopted worldwide as a critical process for conserving heritage places, for example in the British Heritage Lottery Fund guidance note Conservation Plans for Historic Places.

For Kerr, "the seven deadly sins of heritage assessment were: the Timorous; the Inarticulate; the Aesthetes and Moralists; the Indiscriminate; the Egotists; the Slothful and the Muddled".

== Life and family ==
Kerr was born on 6 July 1932 in Rockhampton, Queensland, son of grazier James Kerr and Iris (née Rudd), and he and his sisters were raised on Hampden Downs Station. Initially home schooled by his mother, he later attended Toowoomba Preparatory School and then King's School Parramatta. He joined the Royal Australian Naval Volunteer Reserve in 1952, leaving in 1956. He became an accomplished oarsman in Queensland and later NSW state competitions, but missed out narrowly on selection for the 1956 Olympics.

Kerr married Joan Lyndon (1938–2004), an art and architectural historian, whom he had met in 1957. They wed on 30 November 1960 at All Saints Anglican Church, Brisbane, moving to Sydney soon after. Kerr was working in management at Qantas at the time. In 1963, Qantas posted Kerr to Geneva, and then to London, where Joan enrolled them both in a history of art course run by Nikolaus Pevsner at Birkbeck College. They returned to Australia in 1968, settling in Cremorne in Sydney. They had two children, a daughter, Tamsin and a son, James.

Kerr's wife Joan died in 2004, and James published "Joan Kerr, A Pictorial Biography, 1938–2004" in 2006. He also published letters from his son (also James Semple), who worked as an outback stockman.

Kerr died on Wednesday 15 October 2014 at Elizabeth Lodge nursing home, Willoughby, New South Wales. His final project had been to catalogue the works of his wife and of his own. His personal papers, along with those of his wife, and records of his family history have been deposited, in bound volumes, in the National Library of Australia in Canberra.

== Awards ==
Kerr was made Honorary Life Member of the National Trust (NSW) in 1992 and was awarded the NSW National Trust Heritage Award with his wife Joan in 1995, and they received the lifetime achievement award in 2007, and he was made an Honorary Life Member of Australia ICOMOS in 2003 and International Honorary Life Member in 2011. He was also made a Member of the Order of Australia in 1999, "...for service to heritage conservation through organisations including the Australian International Council on Monuments And Sites, and The New South Wales Branch of the National Trust of Australia".

== Selected publications ==
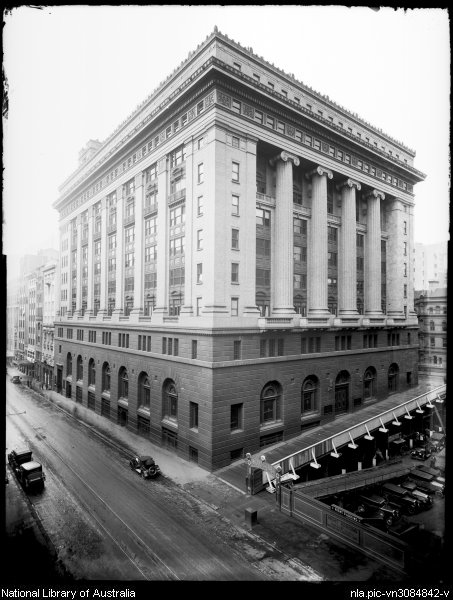
State Savings Bank building, Martin Place, Sydney (1930)

- 1981: Fannie Bay Gaol Precinct conservation management plan
- 1984: Design for convicts: An account of design for convict establishments in the Australian colonies during the transportation Sydney: Library of Australian History in association with the National Trust of Australia (NSW) and the Australian Society for Historical Archaeology ISBN 0908120540
- 1984: Cockatoo Island, penal and institutional remains: An analysis of documentary and physical evidence and an assessment Sydney: National Trust of Australia (NSW), ISBN 0909723397
- 1985: Goat Island: An analysis of documentary and physical evidence and an assessment of significance
- 1986: Fort Denison: An investigation for the Maritime Services Board of NSW
- 1986: Fort Denison: an investigation for the Maritime Services Board of NSW
- 1987: Admiralty House: A conservation plan prepared for the Department of Housing and Construction
- 1988: Out of sight, out of mind: Australia's places of confinement, 1788–1988 Sydney: S.H. Ervin Gallery, National Trust of Australia (NSW), ISBN 0947137807
- 1989: Elephant castle: an investigation of the significance of the head office building of the Commonwealth Banking Corporation of Australia, Sydney, Sydney: National Trust New South Wales ISBN 0947137173
- 1990:The Haymarket and The Capitol: A conservation plan for the area bounded by George, Campbell, Pitt and Hay Streets, Sydney
- 1990: Tamworth Gaol: its development, use, significance and conservation
- 1991 & 2002: Sydney Observatory: a conservation plan for the site and its structures, Sydney: Museum of Applied Arts and Sciences, ISBN 1863170286
- 1992: Fremantle Prison: A policy for its conservation
- 1992: Anderson Stuart’s Medical School: A Plan for Its Conservation
- 1993: Sydney Opera House: an interim plan for the conservation of the Sydney Opera House and its site, published by National Trust, second edition 1999, third (revised) edition 2003 published by The Sydney Opera House Trust, Sydney, NSW.
- 1993: (revised 2001), Yungaba Immigration Depot: a plan for its conservation
- 1994: Goulburn Correctional Centre: A Plan for the Conservation of the Precinct and Its Buildings
- 1995: Parramatta Correctional Centre: Its Past Development and Future Care
- 2000: Conservation plan: a guide to the preparation of conservation plans for places of European cultural significance (5th edition) Sydney: National Trust of Australia (NSW) ISBN 1863640266
- 2002: Sydney Observatory: a conservation plan for the site and its structures, 2nd rev. ed. Sydney: Museum of Applied Arts and Sciences ISBN 1863170286
- 2004: Conservation plan: a guide to the preparation of conservation plans for places of European cultural significance, Sydney: Published by J.S. Kerr on behalf of the National Trust of Australia (NSW)
- 2006: Joan Kerr: a pictorial biography, 1938–2004 Cremorne, NSW ISBN 0977545407

== External Source ==
- Bronwyn Hanna "Obituary – James Semple Kerr, Conservationist 6th July 1932 to 15th October 2014" Engineering Heritage Australia Magazine Volume 1 No.5 December 2014
