= Jonathan Hill (architect) =

English architect and architectural historian (1958–2023)

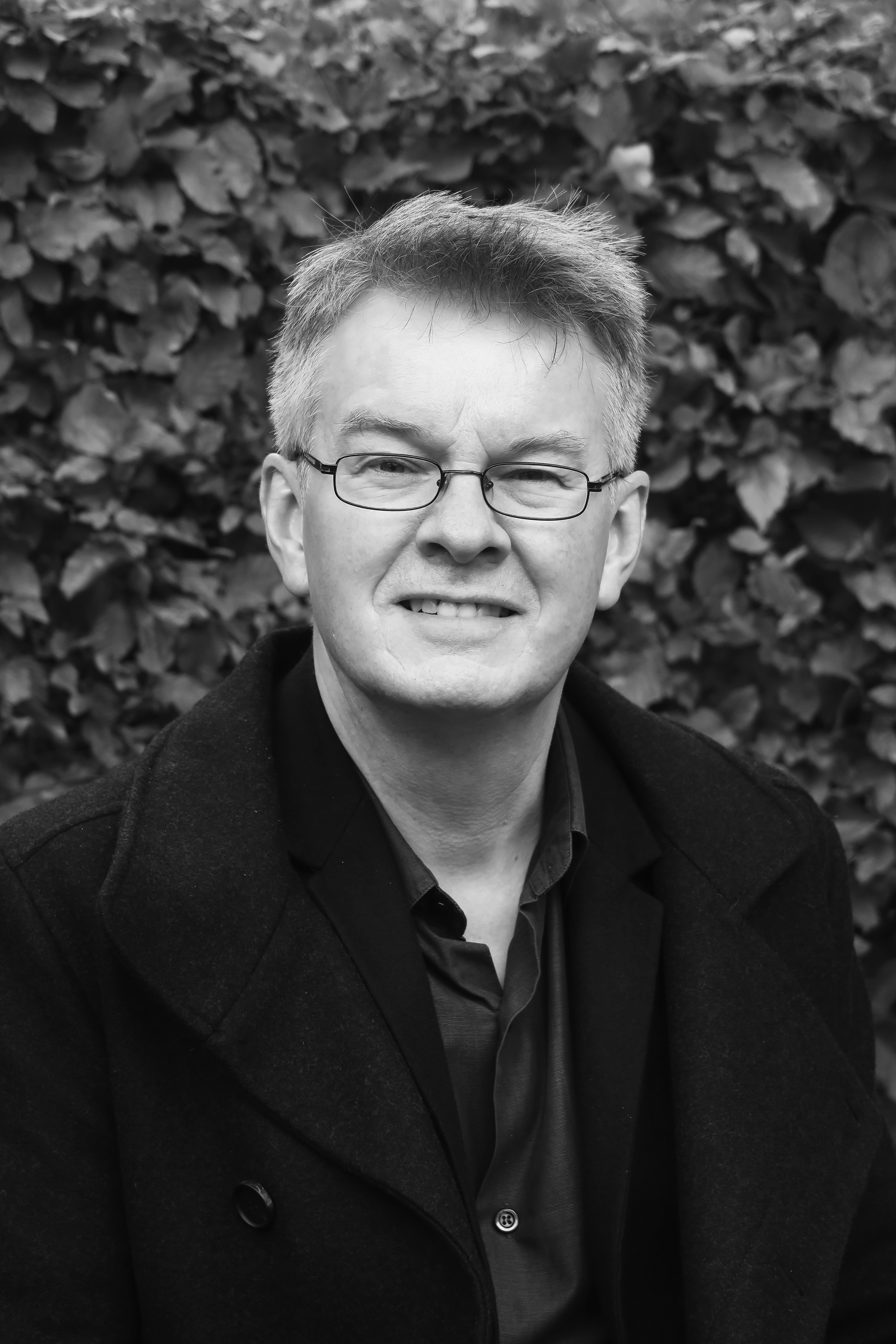
- Hill in 2016
- Born: 17 June 1958; England
- Died: 1 November 2023 (aged 65); London, England
- Other name: Jonathan Michael Hill
- Occupation: Architectural historian
- Years active: 20th–21st century
- Known for: Directorship of the Architectural Design MPhil/PhD programme at UCL
- Title: Professor of Architecture and Visual Theory
- Spouse: Izabela Wieczorek
- Parent: George Hill
- Relatives: G. Noel Hill (grandfather)

Academic background
- Education: Architectural Association School of Architecture; University College London
- Thesis: Creative users, illegal architects (2000)

Academic work
- Discipline: Architecture
- Sub-discipline: Architectural history
- Institutions: The Bartlett School of Architecture, University College London
- Notable works: Weather Architecture (2012)
- Website: ucl.ac.uk/bartlett

Jonathan Hill (17 June 1958 – 1 November 2023) was an English architect, architectural historian, editor, and author.

== Biography ==
Jonathan Hill received a Diploma from the Architectural Association School of Architecture in 1983, a Master of Science degree from University College London in 1990, and a Doctor of Philosophy degree from the University of London in 2000.

Hill joined University College London, part of the University of London, England, in 1989. He was Professor of Architecture and Visual Theory in the Bartlett School of Architecture at UCL. He led the Architecture MArch PG12 studio and was director of the Architectural Design MPhil/PhD programme, the first such programme to be established in the United Kingdom.

Hill died from cancer on 1 November 2023, at the age of 65.

In 2026, Bartlett School of Architecture inaugurated a PhD prize to celebrate 25 years of its Architectural Design MPhil/PhD programme, from which Hill was the first graduate. The Jonathan Hill Architectural Design PhD Fund was announced in January 2026.

== Work ==
Jonathan Hill published a number of books including:

- The Illegal Architect (1998)
- Actions of Architecture: Architects and Creative Users (Taylor & Francis, 2003, ISBN 978-1134437054)
- Drawing Research (2006)
- Immaterial Architecture (Routledge, 2006, ISBN 978-0415363242)
- Weather Architecture (Routledge, 2012, ISBN 978-0415668613)
- A Landscape of Architecture, History and Fiction (Routledge, 2015, ISBN 978-1138852297)
- The Architecture of Ruins: Designs on the Past, Present and Future (Routledge, 2019 ISBN 978-0429429644)

Hill edited the following books:

- Architecture: The Subject is Matter (Routledge, 2001, ISBN 978-0415235457
- Occupying Architecture: Between the Architect and the User (Routledge, 2006, ISBN 978-0203983829)

Hill was also series co-editor of the Design Research in Architecture book series published by Ashgate.

== See also ==
- List of architectural historians
- List of University College London people
