= Heritage Overlay =

Planning function in Victoria, Australia

A Heritage Overlay (HO) is one of a number of planning scheme overlays contained in the Victorian Planning Provisions, for use in planning schemes in Victoria, Australia. The heritage overlay schedule of each local government planning scheme lists sites of local and state significance (Victorian Heritage Register) but does not include sites on the Australian National Heritage List.

Heritage overlays are used to protect sites that have heritage value, meaning that individual buildings or whole urban precincts may be covered. The protection afforded by a Heritage Overlay varies in each instance, though the controls apply to built structures and their associated land. The minimum level of protection is afforded by the mere existence of the overlay and means that any work at all to the building or site will require a planning permit, ensuring that a higher level of scrutiny automatically occurs, regardless of any specific control measures cited. Exemptions from permits can be achieved via a site specific exclusion or an incorporated plan listed in the schedule to the overlay.

Each planning scheme will have a set of maps which indicate the location of overlay controls. Associated with the maps is a schedule listing every individual overlay in that planning scheme according to the following criteria:

- Planning Scheme map reference (HO+number)
- Address of building or name of precinct
- External paint controls
- Internal alteration controls
- Tree controls
- Exemptions for certain outbuildings or fencing
- Victorian Heritage Register listing
- Prohibitions on uses
- Reference to other parts of the Planning Scheme
- Aboriginal heritage

An easy to follow description of how to read a heritage overlay and the different related documents is found at the City of Ballarat Website - What is a Heritage Overlay.

== See also ==
- Burra Charter
