= Sarasi Kumar Saraswati =

Indian architectural historian (1906–1980)

- Born: 1906; Rajshahi, Bengal, British India
- Died: 1980 (aged 73–74); Kolkata, India
- Citizenship: Indian
- Education: University of Calcutta
- Known for: Art and architecture of early Bengal; Early Sculptures of Bengal; A Survey of Indian Sculpture; History of Indian architecture History of Bengal architecture
- Scientific career
- Fields: History of architecture History of art
- Workplaces: Varendra Research Society; University of Calcutta; Banaras Hindu University; Victoria Memorial

Sarasi Kumar Saraswati (1906–1980) was an Indian historian of art and architecture.

== Early life and education ==
Saraswati was born in Rajshahi, British India. He received a MA in 1930 from the University of Calcutta in Ancient Indian History and Culture.

== Positions ==
- Research Scholar, Varendra Research Society, Rajshahi, Bangladesh
- Lecturer and Reader, Department of Ancient Indian History and Culture, University of Calcutta, Calcutta, India
- First Professor and Head of the Department of Archaeology, University of Calcutta.
- Professor and Head of the Department of Ancient Indian History and Culture, Banaras Hindu University, Varanasi, India
- Librarian of the Asiatic Society, Calcutta
- Curator, Victoria Memorial, Calcutta

== Publications ==
=== Books ===
- A survey of Indian sculpture (1975)
- Architecture of Bengal (1976)
- Indian art at the cross-roads (1973)
- Glimpses of Mughal architecture in: A. Goswami (ed) (1953)
- Pal Juger Chitrakala
- Tantrayāna art: an album (1977)

=== Book chapters ===
He authored the chapters on architecture in the following books.

- History of Bengal, vol. I, (ed. by RC Majumdar)
- The History and Culture of the Indian People, (ed. RC Majumdar)
- Comprehensive History of India, vol. II (ed. KA Nilakanta Shastri)
- Comprehensive History of India, vol. III (ed. RC Majumdar)
- Jaina Art and Architecture, (ed. A Ghosh).

=== Articles ===
- Articles on the art and architecture of early Bengal, in the Journal and Proceedings of the Asiatic Society of Bengal 1932-34

== See also ==
- List of architectural historians
