= David Beauchamp =

Australian civil engineer

- Born: 1936 (age 89–90); Auckland, New Zealand
- Citizenship: Australia
- Education: Canterbury University College, Canterbury, New Zealand
- Engineering career
- Discipline: engineer
- Institutions: Institution of Civil Engineers, Institution of Engineers Australia
- Practice name: David Beauchamp Pty. Ltd., Beauchamp Hogg Spano Consultants Pty Ltd
- Awards: Robin Boyd Environmental Medal

David Beauchamp (born 1936) is a New Zealand born, Australian civil engineer who has contributed extensively to engineering heritage and research.

== Education, qualifications and career ==
Beauchamp was born in Auckland New Zealand in 1936, and spent his childhood in Picton before going to Canterbury University College where he completed his B.E. (Civil) in 1958. He was captain of the CUC athletic team in his final year winning the Lovelock Relay in Dunedin. He worked in the New Zealand Ministry of Works in Fiji and Wellington, then moved to Melbourne late in 1963, taking a position with Civil & Civic followed by John Connell & Associates until 1969. He also spent a year working for Mott, Hay and Anderson in their London, UK bridge design section during this period.

He founded his own structural and civil consultancy practice in March 1969, David Beauchamp Pty. Ltd. based in Princes Hill, and latterly Beauchamp Hogg Spano Consultants Pty Ltd in Richmond. The firm specialised in Engineering Design & Consulting Services and Naval Architecture Services, and has worked with many of Melbourne's leading architects on the design of structures for a wide range of buildings.

In later years he specialised in forensic and heritage engineering. He has prepared reports on building Murtoa Grain Store, the Parliament House, Melbourne, the world heritage-listed Royal Exhibition Building Melbourne, and several historic bridges including the Barwon Heads Bridge Geelong, Princes Bridge, Melbourne and the 1867 Ellerslie Bridge.

In the 1970s, Beauchamp collaborated with George Tibbits and Miles Lewis on an analysis of the historic fabric of Carlton, for which they were awarded the Royal Australian Institute of Architects (Victorian Chapter) Robin Boyd Environmental Medal for their report Urban Renewal Carlton an Analysis. This report was an important contribution to the change in planning policy which stopped the Housing Commission of Victoria's Program for demolishing 80 hectares of the historic inner Melbourne suburb of Carlton.

Beauchamp was the first chairman of the Council for the Historic Environment, an inaugural member of the Victorian Heritage Council in 1995 and a member of the National Trust Historic Bridges Committee. He has also been a member of ICOMOS, the Australian Planning Institute, the Institution of Civil Engineers, the Institution of Engineers Australia, and chair of Engineering Heritage Victoria.

== Selected publications ==
- Tibbits, GR and Beauchamp, D. John Harry Grainger: Engineer and Architect [online]. Australian Journal of Multi-disciplinary Engineering, Vol. 8, No. 1, 2010: 11–22. Availability: informit.com.au ISSN 1448-8388. [cited 28 Nov 13].
