= Jamelle =

Jamelle is a given name. Notable people with the name include:

- Jamelle Bouie (born 1987), American columnist
- Jamelle Cornley (born 1987), American basketball player
- Jamelle Elliott (born 1974), American women's basketball head coach
- Jamelle Folsom (1927–2012), First Lady of Alabama
- Jamelle Hagins (born 1990), American basketball player
- Jamelle Holieway (born 1967), American football quarterback
- Jamelle C. Sharpe, American jurist

== See also ==
- Hina Jamelle (born 1973), architect living in the United States
- Jamel (disambiguation)
- Jamell (disambiguation)
- Jemele Hill (born 1975), American sports journalist
