= The History and Culture of the Indian People =

11 volume text

Full set of eleven volumes

The History and Culture of the Indian People is a series of eleven volumes on the history of India, from prehistoric times to the establishment of the modern state in 1947. Historian Ramesh Chandra Majumdar was the general editor of the series, as well as a major contributor. The entire work took 26 years to complete. The set was published in India by the Bharatiya Vidya Bhavan, Mumbai.

== Overview ==
The first volume (1951) is about the Vedic period. It has 27 chapters by 11 contributors. Three chapters and part of a fourth were written by R. C. Majumdar. Other contributors to the first volume are V. M. Apte, A. D. Pusalker and B. K. Ghosh. The volume discusses the archaeology, geology, flora, fauna and other aspects of this period and includes a chapter on the Paleolithic, Neolithic and Copper Age by H. D. Sankalia. This volume was first published by George Allen & Unwin Ltd in London though it was prepared under the auspices of Bharatiya Itihasa Samiti, a part of the Bharatiya Vidya Bhavan. Its subsequent editions and other volumes were published in India by the Bharatiya Vidya Bhavan.

The sixth volume (1960) is on the Sultanate period of medieval India. This volume consists of 19 chapters by 19 contributors. Six chapters and parts of four other chapters were written by R. C. Majumdar. Other significant contributors to this volume are S. Roy, A. K. Majumdar, P. M. Joshi, N. Venkat Ramanayya, S. K. Chatterjee and S. K. Saraswati.

The seventh volume (1974) is on the Mughal era. This volume has 24 chapters by 28 contributors. Only parts of two chapters were written by R. C. Majumdar. The most significant contributors to this volume are J. N. Chaudhuri, G. S. Sardesai, A. L. Srivastava, Abdur Rashid and S. Roy.

== Reception ==
Upon the appearance of the first volume in the series, in a review in the Isis journal M.F. Ashley Montagu described it as:

... the first volume of the first genuine history of India.... [and that it] is likely to remain for many generations the most important of all histories of India, and, indeed, renders all others obsolete if not superfluous.

Marxist historian D. N. Jha however describes the first three volumes thus:

... as informative as they are revivalist and Hindu chauvinist in approach.

Historian John Keay describes the work as:

... a standard work of many volumes commissioned in the 1950s to celebrate India's liberation from foreign rule and foreign scholarship.

== See also ==
- The New Cambridge History of India
