= Crisis in the Built Environment =

1988 book by Jamel Akbar

Crisis in the Built Environment: The Case of the Muslim City
- Author: Jamel Akbar
- Publisher: Concept Media Pte Ltd./Aga Khan Trust for Culture
- Publication date: 1988
- Publication place: English
- Media type: Book
- Pages: 261
- ISBN: 90-04-08757-5
- OCLC: 32102349

Crisis in the Built Environment: The Case of the Muslim City, a book by King Faisal University professor Jamel Akbar, describes the urban environment in the Traditional Muslim city, according to form of control and submission, rather than by visual elements.
