= Ashirbadi Lal Srivastava =

Ashirbadi Lal Srivastava, more commonly known as A.L. Srivastava, born 16 September 1899, in Andhana, Uttar Pradesh, died 12 July 1973, in Agra district, was an Indian historian specialising in medieval, early modern and modern history of India.

== Life and work ==
Srivastava studied history in Lucknow where he completed his Ph.D. (Doctor of philosophy) in 1932, and in Agra and Lucknow where he achieved D. Litt. (Doctor of Letters, 1938/1945) while writing works concerning the three first Nawabs of Oudh (Awadh) in the 18th century (see article Nawabs of Oudh). Besides English and his mother tongue Hindi, he mastered Persian, the language at court and of diplomats, and Urdu while commanding a working knowledge of Sanskrit, Marathi, Rajasthani and Punjabi. For reading Arabic sources he asked for advice from Muslim Maulwis.

In 1917, he was married to Phool Kumari (1904-1973); the couple had three sons and three daughters.

In 1927 he passed his M.A. and got a job at the Government College, Udaipur. In 1932 he was awarded a Ph.D. by the University of Lucknow (the first Ph.D. degree holder in the history of this faculty). In 1934 he became head of the Dungar College, Bikaner, in 1938 he was promoted to D. Litt. by the University of Agra.

In 1943, Srivastava was appointed head of the history department at Government Islamia College, Civil Lines, Lahore, Lahore previously known as D.A.V College, Lahore. In 1946, he was given additional charge of the professorship and head of history department, University of the Punjab, Lahore. In August, 1947, he was appointed professor and head, history and political science department, Agra College, Agra and retired from this Institution on 30 June 1962.

Srivastava published in English as well as in Hindi. As his Guru in history he named Prof. K. R. Qanungo, while he recognized the Bengali historian Jadunath Sarkar (1870-1959) to be the "greatest authority on the history of India".

He died, aged 74, from stomach cancer.

Srivastava was a recipient of the Sir Jadunath Sarkar Gold Medal of the Asiatic Society, Calcutta (1953) for his research in medieval Indian history. He was a contributor to the Encyclopædia Britannica and to the Bengali and the Marathi Encyclopaedias of Calcutta and Poona (see list above) and founder respectively & chief editor of two research journals, Agra College Journal of History and Uttara Bharati Journal of Research. As an academic & professor he supervised about 30 students during their Ph.D. and D.Litt. degrees.

== Partial list of works ==
- The First Two Nawabs of Awadh, Saadat Khan (1680-1739) and Safdar Jung (1708-1754) (1971, Shiva Lal Agarwala) ISBN 9780842615495, 0842615490.
- Shuja-ud-Daulah - Vol. I (1754-1765) (1939, SN Sarkar)
- Shuja-ud-Daulah - Vol. II (1765-1775) (1945, SN Sarkar)
- Sher Shah Suri and His Successors (1539 - 1545 AD) (1950, B.L. Jain)
- The Mughal Empire, 1526 - 1803 A.D (Book) (1964, Shiva Lal Agarwala)
- Akbar the Great : Volume 1, Volume 2, Volume 3 (Book) (1962 - 1973, Shiva Lal Agarwala)
- A Short History of Akbar the Great (1542 - 1605 AD) (1957, Shiva Lal Agarwala)
- Studies in Indian History (Collection of Research Papers)
- History and Culture of Agra (Souvenir), 1956
- History of the Indian Subcontinent, in Encyclopaedia Britannica, 15th edition, 1974, pages 334-430. Publisher-Encyclopaedia Britannica Inc., Helen Hemingway Benton, U.S.A.
- Life in Sanchi Sculpture by A. L Srivastava (Book)
- Nandyāvarta, an auspicious symbol in Indian art by A. L Srivastava (Book)
- Śilpa-śrī, studies in Indian art and culture by A. L Srivastava (Book)
- Umā-Maheśvara : an iconographic study of the divine couple by A. L Srivastava (Book)
- On Siva and Uma (Hindu deities)
- Origin and development of symbols in Indic art; a study
- Commemoration volume on the life and work of K.D. Bajpai, 1918-1992, Indologist, and on the civilization of India
- Śilpa-sahasradala : directory of unique, rare, and uncommon Brahmanical sculptures by N. P Joshi (Book)
- Indian art icons : revealing some glaring glimpses by A. L Srivastava (Book)
- Study of depiction and influence of Hindu culture and mythology in Indian sculpture
- ~~Indian iconography : musing in some unique and unusual sculptures~~ by A. L Srivastava (Book)
- Swastikas as depicted in Indic art and culture; a study
- Commemorative volume published on the occasion of the 71st birth anniversary of Hajārīmala Bān̐ṭhiyā, b. 1924, social worker and educationist from Rajasthan; reminiscences by his friends and associates on his life and work; includes articles by Bān̐thiyā
- The Aligarh movement; its origin and development, 1858-1906 by Ema. Esa Jaina (Book)
- Study on the movement of Indian Muslim regeneration established at Aligarh, India
- Administration of justce [sic] in seventeenth century India; a study of salient concepts of Mughal justice by B. S Jain (Book)
- Major contributions to Volume 7: The Mughul Empire [1526-1707] in The History and Culture of the Indian People
- Medieval Indian Culture (1971, Shiva Lal Agarwala)
- The history of India, 1000 A.D. - 1707 A.D (1964, Shiva Lal Agarwala)
- The Sultanate of Delhi, including the Arab invasion of Sindh, 711 - 1526 AD (1950, Shiva Lal Agarwala)
- Modern India, Part I (1495 - 1858) (1969, Shiva Lal Agarwala)
- Political History, 1542 - 1605 AD (1962, Shiva Lal Agarwala)

== Books in Hindi ==
- Awadh Ke Pratham Do Nawab
- Shuja-ud-daulah, Vol. I (in press)
- Dilli Sultanat
- Mughal Kalin Bharat
- Madhya Kalin Bhartiya Sanskriti
- Bharat Ka Itihas
- Akbar Mahan, Vol. I
- Akbar Mahan, Vol. II
- Bhāratavarsha kā rājanaitika tathā sāṃskr̥tika itihāsa. (1965, Shiva Lal Agarwala)
- Svāstika : Bhāratīya jīvana kā eka apratima pratīka by A. L Srivastava (Book)
- Savatsa gau, athavā, Savatsa dhenu by A. L Srivastava (Book)
- Śrī Hajārīmala Bān̐ṭhiyā abhinandana-grantha (Book)
- Bhāratīya kalā-pratīka by A. L Srivastava (Book)
- Prof Kr̥shṇadatta Bājapeyī : smr̥ti viśeshāṅka (Book)
- Pañcāla kā mūrti-śilpa : eka śodhaparaka vivecana by A. L Srivastava (Book)
- Bhāratīya saṃskr̥ti aura śilpa by A. L Srivastava (Book)
