= Council for the Historic Environment =

- Founded: 1977
- Type: Professional Body
- Location: Melbourne, Australia
- Services: Conservation and protection of cultural heritage places in Australia

The Council for the Historic Environment was a non government body established in 1977 in Victoria, Australia, to investigate, record and advice on heritage and building conservation. It was formed by a group of heritage professionals. academics and government bureaucrats. this was perhaps the first such group in Australia, which aimed to codify and raise the standard of professional practice amongst archaeologists, architects, engineers, historians, planners, etc.

John Murphy was the first President of the Council in 1977, with the inaugural meeting taking place in Phyllis and John's Hawthorn home. David Beauchamp is thought to have been the first Chairman with Neil Clerehan Chairman 1977-80 and President subsequently. Graeme Butler was the founding Secretary and later Editor of the Council Journal, Historic Environment, which launched in 1980. Other office bearers included Miles Lewis (President), Helen Weston (Chair, Secretary, editor of Chen Chen, the Council newsletter), Ray Tonkin, Craig Wilson and Chris Smith (Secretary), Robert Knott and Wendy Jacobs (Treasurer).

Formed as a break-away group from the National Trust of Victoria, the Council was made up of expert panels with each member with recognised expertise assigned to an appropriate panel, as follows:
Architectural History, 20th Century Architecture;
Architectural, Restoration, Preservation Technology;
Conservation Planning, Urban History and Geography;
Interior Design; and
Landscape Planning.

The Panel member list from 1979 included a number of individuals noted for heritage work in 1970s-90s:

- Ralph Andrews
- Bernard Barrett
- David Beauchamp
- Anne Bermingham
- Alison Blake
- Graeme Butler
- Neil Clerehan
- Carol Frank-Mas
- John Hitch
- Dewar Goode
- Wendy Jacobs
- Ian Johnson
- David Johnston
- John Kenny
- Robert Knott
- Miles Lewis
- Nigel Lewis
- Gordon Loader
- Bill Logan
- Peter Lovell
- John Mitchell
- Margaret Monk
- John Murphy
- Phyllis Murphy
- Peter Navaretti
- Ray Tonkin
- Liz Vines
- Stuart Warmington
- Judith Wells
- Helen Weston
- Craig Wilson
- Lawrie Wilson

Although always focussing on process, the Council was active in early heritage battles such as the Royal Exhibition Building in Melbourne, which was proposed for demolition at the time, as well as the fight to preserve Carlton, Victoria. It also published a journal, Historic Environment, which was the first peer reviewed heritage focussed publication in Australia, and remains the primary outlet for discussion and debate on heritage matters in Australia. With the growth of Australia ICOMOS, state heritage bodies such as the Historic Buildings Council, later becoming Heritage Victoria, the Council for the Historic Environment merged with Australia ICOMOS. The Council successfully promoted the formation of an architectural drawing collection at the State Library of Victoria with a pilot survey of selected architectural practices in 1985-6. An architectural guidebook to the Melbourne region was also commenced but never reached finality.

Following is a list of annual general meetings 1978-1984, speakers and the meeting venues as an indication of the variety and thrust of the organisation:

- 1978 Hon Robert Maclellan, MLC Minister for Labour and Industry at the Former Rechabite Hall, Clarence Street, Prahran
- 1979 John Mitchell, Melbourne City Councillor at Boojums Restaurant Rathdowne Street, North Carlton
- 1980 Andrew Lemmon, Local historian, King Solomon's Restaurant, Nicholson Street, North Fitzroy
- 1981 Peter Staughton, Restoration architect, Comedy Cafe Brunswick. Street, Fitzroy
- 1982 Graham Ihlein MP (filling in for Hon Evan Walker, Minister for Planning) at Young and Jacksons, Melbourne
- 1983 Professor Graeme Davidson Historian, Monash University at the newly renovated Heidelberg Town Hall Ivanhoe
- 1984 Dimity Reed Deputy Manager, Ministry for Housing, Nettleton House Restaurant at the Alma Complex Abbotsford

The Council also conducted a number of tours across Victoria focussing on the various panels expertise such as industrial archaeology, architecture, heritage interiors and landscape.
