= Graeme Butler =

Australian conservation architect

Graeme Butler is a heritage architect who has practised in Melbourne, Australia since the 1970s. He is principal of the heritage firm Graeme Butler & Associates and author of many urban conservation and heritage studies, including work on the Californian bungalow in Australia described as ...the quintessential work on the form.

Butler studied architecture at the University of Melbourne, graduating (in 1972) with a major in history as well as the typical design subject. The broadening of the Melbourne Architecture School's curriculum to include architectural history had been given impetus by student strikes at the University in the 1960s. Before and after graduating Butler worked for architectural firms Rosman Hastings & Sorrel (1967), Burgess & Sprintz (1969), Bogle & Banfield (1972) and as a design assistant at Yuncken Freeman Architects (YFA; 1972-1975). At YFA Butler worked on the interior fit-out of the Austin Hospital new ward block under Tony Woodhouse. Butler eventually took a lead design role on the completion of the Toorak Teachers College library and theatre building under YFA partner (and confidant of Robin Boyd) Roy Simpson, whose instruction on approaching the design was, `Graeme ... give me some joy'. Joy or otherwise Butler prepared the design in the then-Miesian-influenced YFA house style, as typified by the firm's former (and now largely demolished) offices at 411 King Street, Melbourne and by BHP House. In contrast to the matte black external finish of these buildings Butler designed the Toorak Teachers College library and theatre building in white, as a reference to the external colour of the adjoining Stonington Mansion (built for John Wagner, a partner in the Cobb and Co stagecoach company). The design included internal two-storey spaces and floating stairs, following YFA's preferred Ludwig Mies van der Rohe model. Butler then worked with McIntyre & McIntyre (1975-1976) on the recycling of the Henry Jones Jam Factory on Chapel Street, Prahran as a shopping centre and cinema development. Butler's later principal architectural role was with the firm Perrott Lyon Timlock and Kesa, later Perrott Lyon Mathieson (PLM; 1975-1981), as the project designer for the fit-out of central Melbourne's Museum underground railway (now Grand Central) and Melbourne Underground Loop Authority (MURLA) system graphics documentation, initially under PLM associate David Simpson. The design of the Victorian Teachers Union offices in Camberwell for PLM under Brian Mathieson was Butler's last major architectural design work before taking on a professional role in 1981 in the growing field of urban conservation. Ahead of founding his own heritage consulting practice, while still working for PLM, Butler had completed in the mid 1970s one of the first heritage studies of the Melbourne central business district(undertaken for the newly created Historic Buildings Preservation Council) and the City of Castlemaine Conservation Study.

Butler has subsequently undertaken numerous other heritage studies in Victoria, addressing many Melbourne suburbs as well as Geelong, Bendigo and the Macedon Ranges. He has been described as one of Australia’s most significant practitioners and researchers in heritage and conservation. He was the founding Secretary of the heritage professional group Council for the Historic Environment and later editor of the Council journal Historic Environment, launched in 1980.

== Publications ==
- Butler, Graeme; Buln Buln (Vic. : Shire). Council (1979), Buln Buln : a history of the Buln Buln Shire, Shire of Buln Buln, ISBN 978-0-9595231-0-2
- Butler, Graeme; Graeme Butler & Associates (1992), The Californian bungalow in Australia origins, revival, source ideas for restoration, Graeme Butler & Associates (published 2010), ISBN 978-0-85091-355-2

Official website photostream
