= Conservation Plan =

Work by James Semple Kerr

- Author: James Semple Kerr
- Language: English
- Genre: Heritage conservation
- Publication date: 1982
- Publication place: Australia
- Media type: Print (hardback & paperback), online
- Pages: 84 pp
- ISBN: 1-86364-026-6

The Conservation Plan is an important publication written by James Semple Kerr in 1982 and revised many times. It was a landmark in Australian conservation. The document "...outlines the logical processes of the Burra Charter, and how to prepare a Conservation Plan to guide and manage change to a heritage item appropriately". Subtitled "a guide to the preparation of conservation plans for places of European cultural significance", it has guided building conservation in Australia and around the world.

The Conservation Plan is widely used by heritage practitioners and property owners in Australia, and worldwide as a primary guide to the process of researching, documenting and managing historic places in accordance with the Burra Charter, through a logical process. First published by the National Trust of Australia (NSW) in 1982, it has subsequently been reprinted in expanded form over seven editions and twelve printing impressions. The concept has been adopted worldwide as a critical process for conserving heritage places, for example in the British Heritage Lottery Fund guidance note Conservation Plans for Historic Places, Wales and British Columbia.
