= Jamell =

Jamell is a given name. Notable people with the name include:

- Jamell Anderson (born 1990), British basketball player
- Jamell Fleming (born 1989), American football cornerback
- Jamell Ramos (born 1981), Colombian footballer

== See also ==
- Jamelle (disambiguation)
