= Jamel Akbar =

Saudi architect

- جميل أكبر
- Born: Jamel Abdel Qader Mohamed Abed Fadel Akbar; May 26, 1954 (age 72); Taif, Hejaz, Saudi Arabia
- Education: King Saud University (BSc, 1977); Massachusetts Institute of Technology (MArchAS, PhD, 1984)
- Known for: Property rights theory in the built environment, Crisis in the Built Environment, Qas al-Haq
- Awards: King Fahd Award for Design and Research in Islamic Architecture (1986); Organization of Islamic Capitals and Cities First Award (2007)
- Scientific career
- Fields: Architecture, Urban design, Architectural theory
- Workplaces: University of Dammam; Massachusetts Institute of Technology (Visiting); Fatih Sultan Mehmet Vakıf University
- Doctoral advisor: N. John Habraken

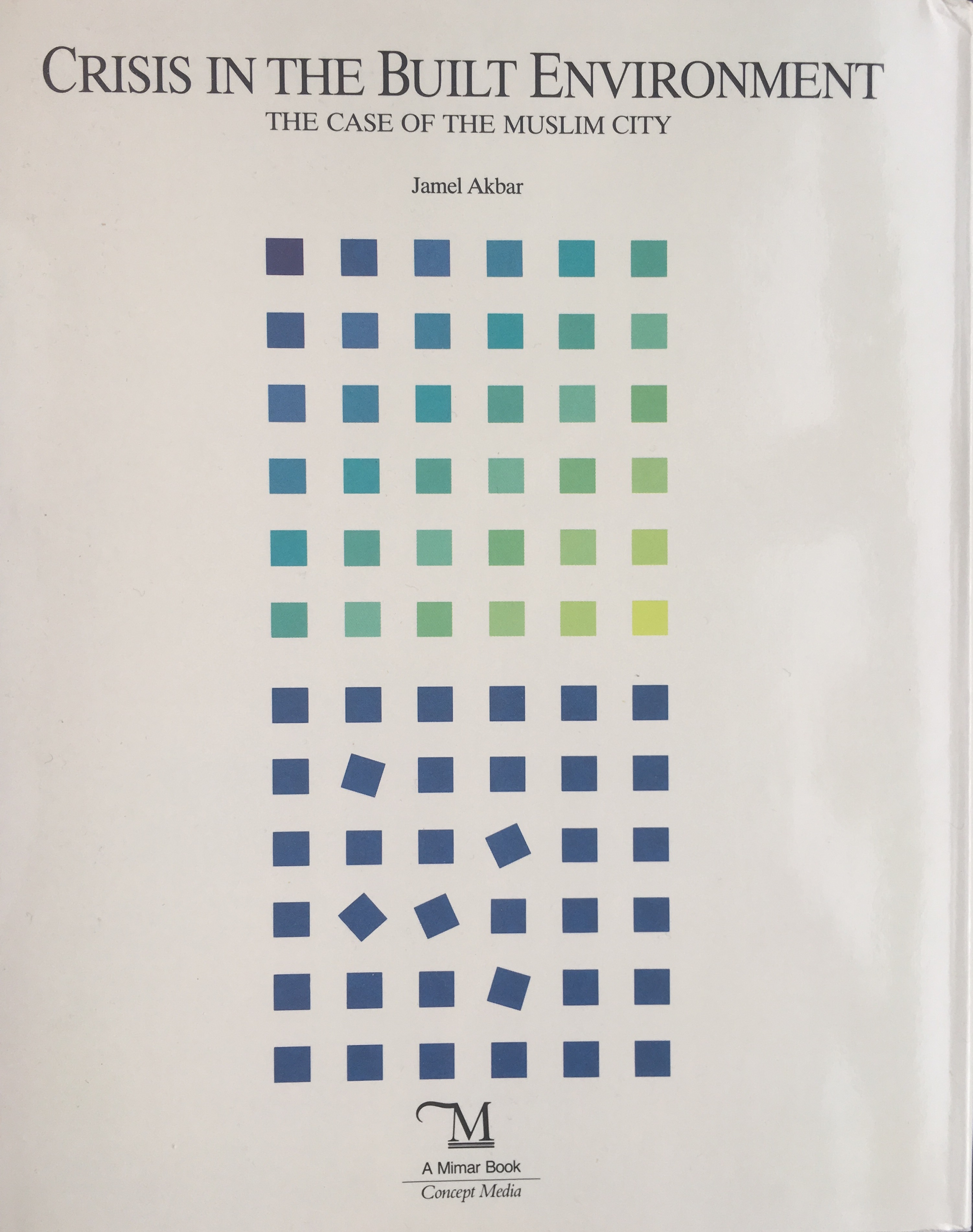
Crisis in the Built Environment: The case of the Muslim city,1988

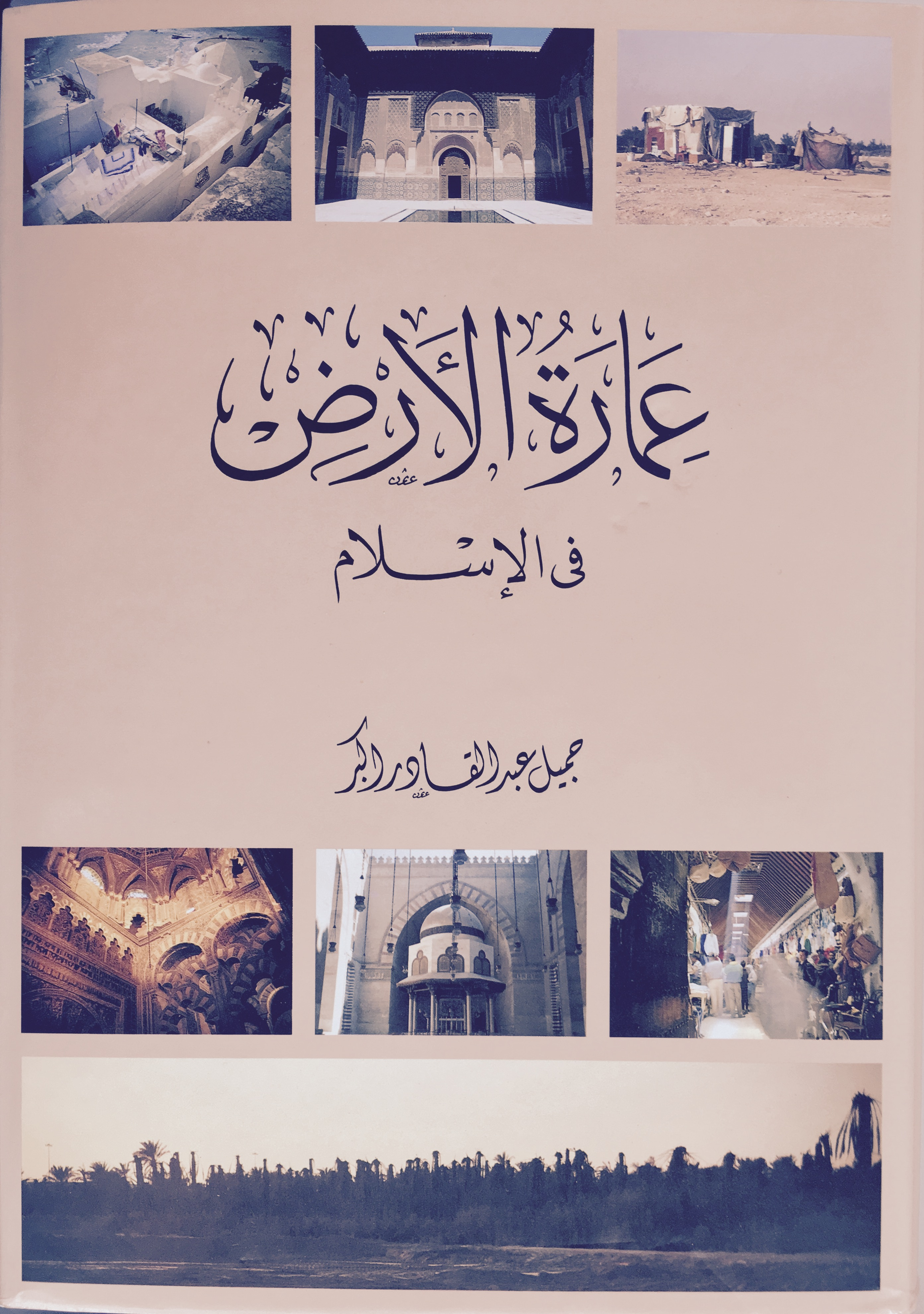
I’marat al-A’rd fi al-I'slam, 1992

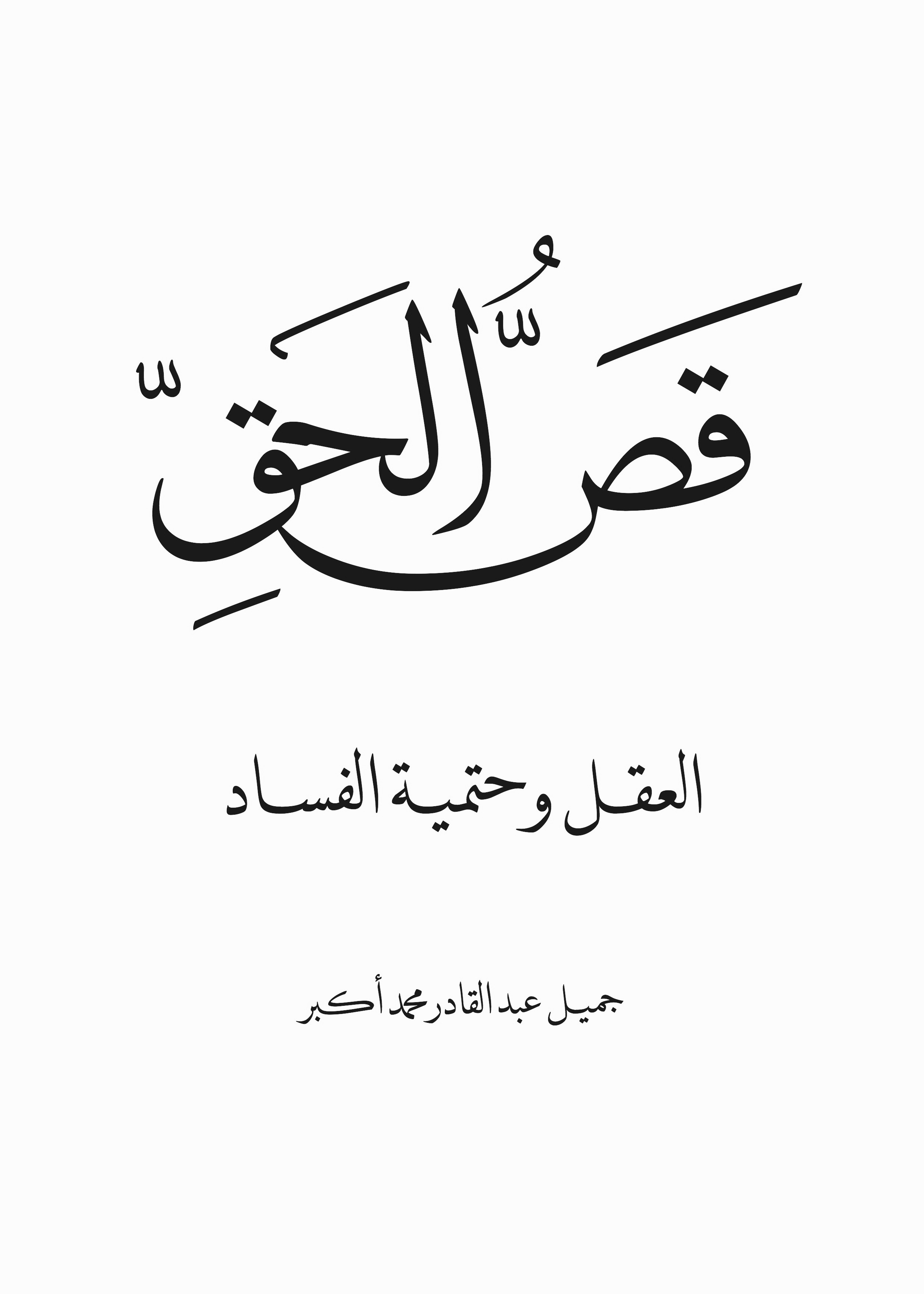
Qas al-Haq, 2014

Jamel Akbar (born 26 May 1954) is an architect, educator, and theorist. His theoretical contributions are in the field of the built environment. His major contribution is in measuring the quality of the built environment through concepts such as responsibility, control, ownership and interventions. His work concentrates on humans' and properties’ rights among individuals, institutions and the State. By comparing such rights in different cultures he developed conclusions concerning economic and social settings and their ramifications on the quality of the built environment.

== Biography ==
Akbar was born in Taif, Hejaz, Saudi Arabia. He studied architecture at King Saud University, Saudi Arabia from 1972 to 1977. Then he went to Massachusetts Institute of Technology from 1978 to 1984, where he had both M.Arch.A.S. and Ph.D. degrees. During his studies at MIT, he had the chance to teach several courses with Prof N. John Habraken and Stanford Anderson.

From 1984 to 2016, Akbar taught at the University of Dammam. However, in 1990 he taught at MIT as a visiting associate professor. He held few academic positions at University of Dammam such as vice dean and department chairman. He also participated in several external academic activities such as serving as a technical reviewer for the Aga Khan Award for Architecture for three cycles. For five years he served as the Head of the "Scientific Editing Team" of the "King Abdullah Project for the expansion of the Holy Mosque in Mecca". He was the Chairman of the Board of the Saudi Umran Society (the equivalent of Architects, Urban Designers and Planners Scientific Associations in other countries).

However, Akbar remains occupied with theories of architecture, urban design and planning in terms of the individual’s and properties’ rights vs the quality of the built environment. He has lectured on these topics worldwide and is the author of three books, several research reports, and many articles. His book Crisis in the Built Environment is an investigation of the patterns of responsibility and their manifestations on the built environment as revealed through patterns of decision-making processes by rules, regulations, and conventions. He expanded the concept of Crisis in an Arabic book titled I’marat al-A’rd fi al-I'slam. His most recent book, Qas al-Haq which took him more than 20 years to write (about 1700 pages) is an attempt to explain patterns of economic behaviours, empowerment, justice, equity, industrialization, globalization, sustainability and the societies progress.

== Awards and honors ==
Akbar is the recipient of The King Fahd Awards Competition for Design and Research in Islamic Architecture in 1986; and of the 2007 First Award of the Organization of Islamic Capitals and Cities. Akbar is much proud of a letter of recommendation from his mentor N. John Habraken who taught at MIT for 14 years. In his letter, Habraken stated: "I do not believe in all my years of teaching to have met another student who matched the combination of research skills and ability for theoretical constructs that he brought with him to MIT"

== Publications ==
Books

- Akbar, Jamel A, Qas Al-Haq. So far more than 1700 pages were written (12 Chapters), 6 more are remaining. Available on the internet for readers’ comments thus to be published after completion.
- Akbar, Jamel A, ‘Imarat al-’ard fi al-’Islam, published by Dar al-Qibla, Jeddah, Saudi Arabia.1992. 2nd. ed. in 1995, published by Dar Al-Bshir, Amman, Jordan. 3rd ed. published by Al-Resalah publishers, Beirut, Lebanon,
- Akbar, Jamel A., Crisis in the Built Environment: the Case of the Muslim City, published by Concept Media (the publishers of Mimar magazine), formerly in Singapore, and moved to England, ISBN 9971848694; distributed by. E. J. Brill, Leiden, the Netherlands, 1988; ISBN 9004087575

Articles

- Akbar, J., ″Al-Umran wa mo’assasatuh wa al-istidamah″ Proceedings of the First Conference of Housing organized by Sheikh Zayed Bin Sultan Program for housing, in collaboration with UN Habitat. Abu Dhabi, 13–15 October (in Arabic)
- Akbar, J., "Traditional Muslim Built Environment: an alternative paradigm". Big Project magazine, Dubai.2008.
- Akbar, J., "The merits of cities’ locations". Elsheshtawy, Y. (ed.), Planning Middle Eastern Cities: an urban kaleidoscope in a globalized world". London, Routledge, 2004. pp. 22–28. Reprinted in the journal of Environment and Society, June, 2008
- Akbar, J., "Learning from tradition: land provision and population growth - the case of Saudi Arabia". Journal of King Saud University. Vol.14, pp. 41–58.
- Akbar, J., "Kosour al-‘aql al-bashari wa al-takhalluf al-‘umrani". In Journal of King Saud University. vol.12, pp. 115–147. (in Arabic).
- Akbar, J., "Rationality: the blight of the Muslim built environment". In O’Reilly, W. (ed.), Architectural knowledge and cultural diversity. Lausanne, Switzerland, Comportements. pp. 127–133.
- Akbar, J., "Rehabilitation of Ksour, Draa Valley, Morocco," in Azim Nanji (ed.); Building for Tomorrow. Academy Editions, London, 1994.
- Akbar, J., "Hal Hunaka Madina Islamiyya?" In Journal of King Saud University, vol. 6, Architecture and Planning, 1994. pp. 3–28. (In Arabic)
- Akbar, J., "Gates as signs of autonomy in Muslim towns," Muqarnas: An Annual on Islamic Art and Architecture, published by E. J. Brill, V. 10, pp. 141–147.
- Al-Saati, A & Akbar, J., "The role of professional designers in the Muslim world," Open House International, Vol. 18, No.1, 1993, Newcastle upon Tyne, UK., pp. 28–32.
- Akbar, J., "Losing Interest: Blight of the Muslim City," Open House International, Vol. 14, No.3, 1989, Newcastle upon Tyne, UK., pp. 28–35.
- Akbar, J., "Law and the Environment in the Middle East," Open House International, Vol. 14, No.2, 1989, Newcastle upon Tyne, UK., pp. 3–8
- Akbar, J., "Party Walls and Adaptability: the Case of the Muslim Environment," Open House International, Vol. 13, No. 4, 1988, Newcastle upon Tyne, UK., pp. 25–28.
- Akbar, J., "Khatta and the Territorial Structure of Early Muslim Towns," Muqarnas: An Annual on Islamic Art and Architecture, published by E. J. Brill, V. 6, pp. 22–32.
- Akbar, J., "The Design of a Support for Courtyard Houses," Riyadh, Saudi Arabia; Open House, V. 5 No. 4, 1980, Eindhoven, Holland, pp. 2–15.

Papers

- Akbar, J; "Al-Umran wa mo’assasatuh", in Al-Ijtihad in issues of health, environment, and the built environment. Proceeding of a conference held in Irbid, Jordan organized by the Yarmouk University, 3–5 May 2003. (in Arabic)
- Akbar, J., "’Aliyat al-ibda‘ fi al-‘amarah al-Islamia," Ishkaliyat alnatharia wa al-tatbiq fi al-‘amarah al-taqlidia. Proceedings of a conference held in Bahrain between 16–18 January 1995. Republished in the journal of al-madina al-‘arabia. (in Arabic)
- Akbar, J., "Al-Umran wa anmat al-mulkia" a paper presented in a conference in Asila, Morocco, 6–8 August 1994 (in Arabic).
- Akbar, J., "Azmat al-hawiya al-‘umrania". A paper presented in the seventh architectural week conference in the Jordan Engineers association held in Amman-Jordan, August 1993. Published in the Journal of the Jordanian engineer, August, 1993. (in Arabic)
- Akbar, J., "Accretion of Decisions: A Design Strategy,"Theories and Principles of Design in the Architecture of Islamic Societies, Proceedings of a Symposium held at Harvard U. and the Massachusetts Institute of Technology, edited by M. B. Sevcenko; Cambridge, Mass., 1988, pp. 107-114.
- Akbar, J. "Architecture Education in the Kingdom of Saudi Arabia," Architecture Education in the Islamic World, Proceedings of a conference held in Granada, Spain, edited by A. Evin, published by Concept Media, Singapore, 1986, pp. 123–130.*
- Akbar, J., "Al-mas’oulia wa al-‘amara: dirasah littariq al- ghir nafith" (Responsibility and the Environment: the Study of the Dead-End Street), submitted to a Seminar held at the College of Architecture and Planning, King Saud University, Riyadh, Saudi Arabia (in Arabic).
- Akbar, J., "Courtyard Houses: A Case Study From Riyadh, Saudi Arabia," The Arab City, Its Character and Islamic Heritage, AUDI proceedings of a symposium held in Medina, Saudi Arabia, 1981, pp. 162–176.

Other publications

- Akbar, J., Architectural Determinism, DAAR, Department of Architecture, King Faisal U., Oct. 1988, V.1., pp. 8–9.
- Panel Discussions of Regionalism in Architecture: proceedings of a seminar held in Dhaka, Bangladesh, edited by Robert Powell, pp. 173– 4
- Habraken, N. J., Liu, L., and Akbar, J., Thematic Design: Class Notes, Department of Architecture, MIT, 1982.
