= Anne Bermingham =

Australian chemist

- Born: 1925; Melbourne, Australia
- Died: 2006 (aged 80–81); Melbourne, Australia
- Education: University of Melbourne
- Awards: English Speaking Union Travelling Scholarship (1956)
- Scientific career
- Fields: Chemistry

Anne Bermingham (1925–2006) was a chemist who pioneered radio carbon dating in Australia at the Museum of Applied Science in Melbourne.

== Education ==
Bermingham obtained a Bachelor of Science degree at the University of Melbourne in 1948. In 1956 she was awarded a Travelling Scholarship from the English Speaking Union and used it to visit radiocarbon dating laboratories in the USA.

== Career ==
Between 1946 and 1952, Birmingham held positions as Chemist with the Melbourne and Metropolitan Board of Works, followed by Lifeguard Milk Products in Bacchus Marsh, and then Swallow and Ariell ice cream in Melbourne.

In 1952, she took up a position as chemist at the Museum of Applied Science, Melbourne. She was initially appointed at a lower grade and salary than advertised because she was a woman. She was instructed to design and operate a carbon dating facility, since there was no such facility in Australia at the time. By 1958 an electronics technician (Mr R. D. Carman) had been appointed to assist her with electronics development, and further technicians were employed later. Bermingham successfully operated a process to obtain carbon dioxide from carbonaceous material and built an apparatus for counting carbon-14 decompositions. The Museum's C-14 Laboratory, opened in 1961, was the first facility of its type in Australia. The first dates were made available to clients in 1965.

In the 1960s, Bermingham played an important role in establishing the antiquity of Aboriginal occupation in Australia, corresponding with a number of archaeologists and geologists in establishing dates and dating methods at sites such as Green Gully and Kenniff Cave with John Mulvaney, establishing the Pleistocene dates for the flint mining site at Koonalda Cave, and the shell midden material at Rocky Cape in Tasmania. She was made an honorary member of the Archaeological Society in 1965.

However, the C-14 counter was never satisfactory, or profitable, and the radiocarbon laboratory closed in late 1970. By this time there were a number of other services in Australia undertaking C-14 dating.

With the name change to the museum in 1961, she was appointed as Chemist with the Institute of Applied Science and then with the Science Museum of Victoria in 1971. In 1974, however, the position of Chemist was made redundant at the Museum, and Anne was redeployed to the Victorian Ministry for the Arts as Scientific Conservation Officer, where she worked in the area of conservation of heritage collections. She also lectured at Prahran College of Advanced Education and was a member of their Museum Studies Advisory Committee in 1980–81, and a panel member of Council for the Historic Environment.

Bermingham died in Melbourne in 2006.

== Portrait ==
- https://www.facebook.com/melbournemuseum/photos/a.377723823921/10156374312453922/
