= Zehiriyeh =

Zehiriyeh ظهيريه
- Village
- Location within Iran
- Coordinates: 31°48′30″N 49°01′17″E
- Country: Iran
- Province: Khuzestan
- County: Shushtar
- Bakhsh: Central
- Rural District: Shahid Modarres

Population (2006)
  - Total: 277
- Time zone: UTC+3:30 (IRST)
  - Summer (DST): UTC+4:30 (IRDT)

Zehiriyeh (Persian: ظهيريه, also Romanized as Z̧ehīrīyeh, Z̧ahīrīyeh, and Zahriyeh; also known as Z̧ahīrī) is a village in Shahid Modarres Rural District, in the Central District of Shushtar County, Khuzestan Province, Iran. At the 2006 census, its population was 277, in 62 families.
