= Miles Lewis =

Australian academic

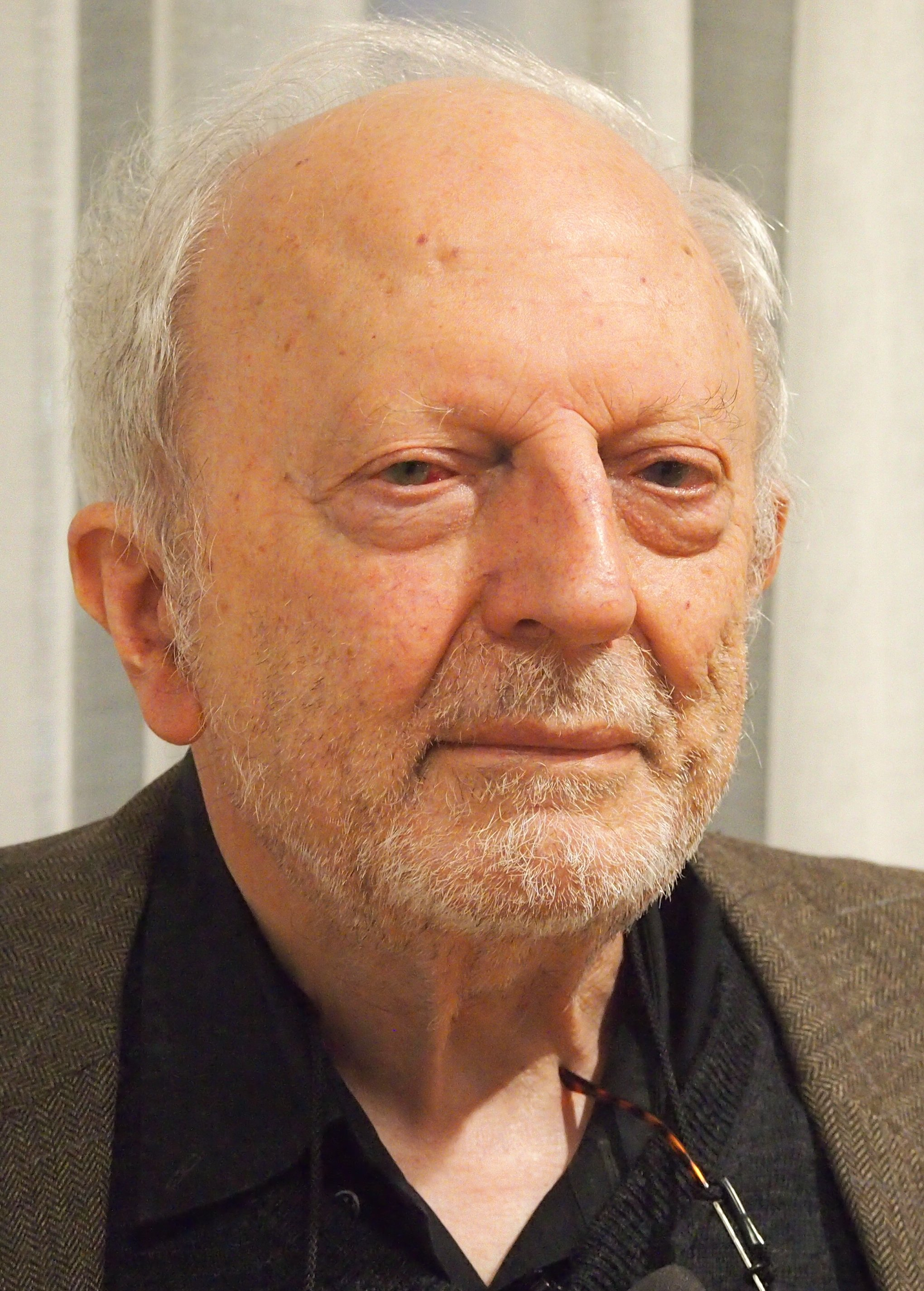
Miles Lewis in 2024

Professor Miles Lewis AM FAHA (born 1943, Amersham, UK) is an Australian academic serving as a professor in the Faculty of Architecture, Building & Planning, at the University of Melbourne, Australia. He is one of Australia's most notable Architectural historians, and a member of the Order of Australia. He is a Fellow of the Australian Academy of the Humanities, a former President of Australia ICOMOS, of the Society of Architectural Historians Australia and New Zealand and of the Council for the Historic Environment. He is an immediate past President of the Town and Country Planning Association, and current vice-president of the Comité International d’Architecture Vernaculaire (CIAV). He is a former member of the Administrative Appeals Tribunal, Victoria (now VCAT) and a former Auckland University Foundation Fellow. Professor Lewis has been a consultant on World Heritage listing and to the Getty Institute. He participated in the Tianjin Urban Conservation Study, China. He has many research interests include urban conservation, urban renewal, building history, prefabrication, vernacular architecture, and urban policy.

An architectural historian and commentator on planning issues in the media, Professor Lewis has a number of databases online relating to architectural history and the history of building construction in Australia which are sources for others in the profession.

In 2013, Professor Lewis was awarded Honorary Life Membership of the National Trust of Australia (Victoria).

Lewis is a member of the Portable Buildings World Heritage Nomination Task Force, which advocates for UNESCO World Heritage listing of 19th century prefabricated buildings in Australia.

== Selected publications ==
=== Books ===
- Lewis, Miles 2021. Architectural Drawings: Collecting in Australia. Melbourne: Melbourne Books.
- Lewis MB. 1999. Suburban backlash: the battle for the world's most liveable city. Melbourne: Bloomings Books.
- Lewis MB. 1994. Melbourne: the city's history and development. Melbourne: City of Melbourne.
- Lewis MB [ed]. 1991. Victorian churches. Melbourne: National Trust of Australia ( Victoria).
- Lewis MB [ed]. 1988. Two hundred years of concrete in Australia. North Sydney: Concrete Institute of Australia.
- Lewis MB. 1983. The essential Maldon. Richmond, Vic: Greenhouse in association with the National Trust of Australia (Victoria),
- Lewis MB. 1977. Don John of Balaclava. Melbourne: Brian Atkins.
- Lewis MB. 1977. Victorian primitive. Carlton, Vic: Greenhouse Publications.
