= Jamel James Johnson =

American-Jamaican soccer player (born 1990)

Jamel Johnson (born 26 April 1990) is an American-Jamaican former professional footballer who played as a forward.

== Career ==
Johnson attended American Heritage High School in Plantation, Florida where he was a two-time state Champion and 2008 tournament MVP. He played club soccer for West Pines United FC in Pembroke Pines, Florida, he was a US youth International and ODP Region 3 team member. He attended the University of North Carolina at Greensboro in 2009.

Johnson trialled with Danish club FC Fyn in August 2010. He signed his first professional contract with the club and was to remain with the club until 1 December.

Having previously trained with KSV Roeselare in Belgium as well as Hannover 96 and Hansa Rostock in Germany, he trialled with Mexican club CF Pachuca in summer 2011. In 2013 he signed to Austrian Wiener Stadtliga team de:Gersthofer SV. In 2014, he was called into preseason camp with the New England Revolution but was later released. In 2016 Johnson registered with Danish club Aab.
