= 640 Broadway =

Historic building in Manhattan, New York

Coordinates: 40.726307°N 73.995768°W

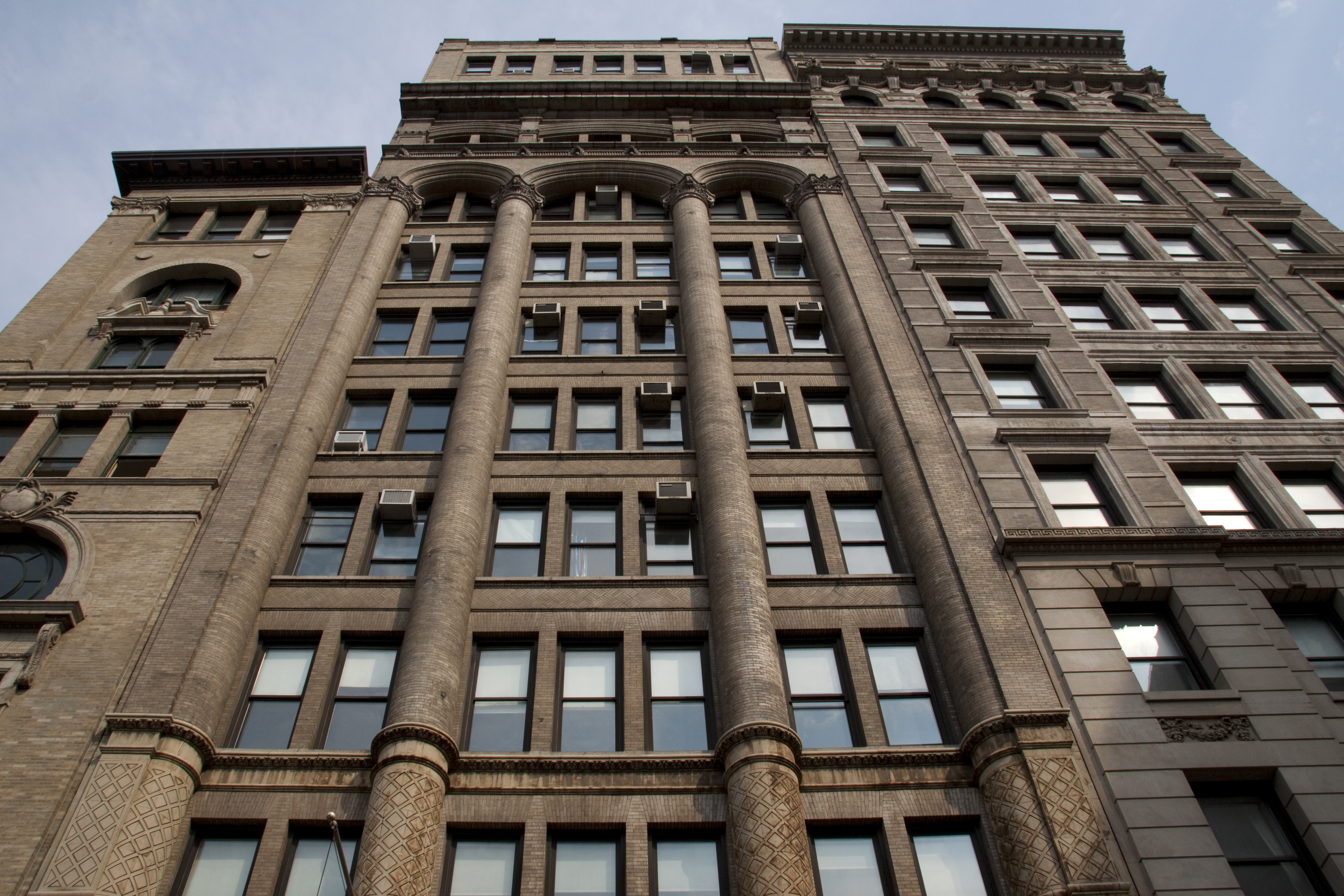
640 Broadway

640 Broadway (also known as 172 Crosby Street or 60-74 Bleecker Street) is a 9-story neoclassic construction located in the NoHo Historic District of Lower Manhattan, New York City. This current structure replaced a former building that housed the Empire State Bank. After a fire destroyed the site in 1896, B. Lichtenstein, who owned the property since 1886, commissioned German architects Delemos & Cordes to redevelop the lot. Known for their Renaissance Revival and Classical Revival style, Delemos & Cordes contributed a number of properties to the Ladies Historic District, most notably the Siegel-Cooper Department Store (1896-1898) and Adams Dry Good Store (1902). The team is also responsible for the design of Macy's Herald Square, a landmarked retail space in Midtown Manhattan.

== Architecture ==
640 Broadway demonstrates Delemos & Cordes' competency for Neoclassic design. The Broadway facade shows a two-story base with second-story comer show windows, a limestone entrance leading to the upper floors with oval transom, a denticulated hood and paired, grouped and arched fenestration across the upper stories. Classical ornamentation, including cartouches, triglyphs, keystones, molded architraves and foliated capitals ornament the facade. The Bleecker Street facade shows the same two-story brick base, recessed fenestration, a historic wood sash and end bay at the west, similar to the Broadway facade. This side features brick piers with stylized terra-cotta capitals, a decorative wrought-iron fire escape and a bracketed galvanized iron cornice. The Crosby Street side offers cast-iron columns supporting decorative lintels at ground level, with concrete block infill and metal doors.

== History ==
640 Broadway was called the Empire State Bank Building in honor of the property's former tenant. The Lichtenstein family held the property until at least 1909, and it remained a mixed use site until 1976. In 1943, owners filed a document with the Department of Buildings indicating that the site housed towel, window cleaner, millinery, gloves, and shoe manufacturers. By 1965, a barber shop occupied the ground floor and the upper stories were used by a dress, buttons and badges manufacturer, and a cloth cutter. A decade later, an offset press, food and vitamin distributor, importer and interior design firm rented space at the site.

In 2007, the upper stories were converted to living-working quarters of 2-3 apartments per floor. Winhaven Group purchased the property in 2012 for $32.5 million. Today, the main ground level is occupied by Swatch and the upper stories offer luxury residential units.
