= Australia ICOMOS =

Heritage conservation body in Australia

- Founded: 1976
- Type: Professional Body
- Location: Melbourne, Australia
- Services: Conservation and protection of cultural heritage places in Australia
- Website: australia.icomos.org

Australia ICOMOS is a peak cultural heritage conservation body in Australia. It is a branch of the United Nations-sponsored International Council on Monuments and Sites (ICOMOS), a non-government professional organisation promoting expertise in the conservation of place-based cultural heritage. Its secretariat is based at the Cultural Heritage Centre for Asia and the Pacific at Deakin University.

== Formation and role ==
Australia ICOMOS was formed in 1976 and is one of over 100 current ICOMOS national committees. ICOMOS was formed in Paris in 1965, following acceptance of Venice Charter 1964, which itself grew out of Athens Charter 1933, led by modernist architect Le Corbusier in regard to urban planning. ICOMOS soon became one of three UNESCO advisors on the assessment of sites proposed for the World Heritage List, along with the International Union for the Conservation of Nature and Natural Resources (IUCN) (1948- ) in Switzerland, and the International Centre for the Study of the Preservation and Restoration of Cultural Material (ICCROM) (1956- ) in Rome, Italy.

Membership of Australia ICOMOS comprises over 650 members, managed by an executive committee of 15 people who are elected from the membership. Several Australia ICOMOS members are also represented on various ICOMOS International Scientific Committees, and expert committees and boards in Australia. It plays an important role in coordinating advocacy activities to raise the profile of Australia's cultural heritage.

The first meeting which led to the formation of Australia ICOMOS was in Melbourne on 20 October 1976, and the first ICOMOS conference was held in Beechworth, Victoria, in 1978, where they devised a committee to work up a local version of the Venice Charter. The actual ICOMOS meeting where the committee's draft was provisionally endorsed was in the town of Burra in 1979. Australia ICOMOS played the pivotal role in developing the Burra Charter: Australia ICOMOS Charter for the Conservation of Places of Cultural Significance (1979) regarded as the best-practice standard for place-based cultural heritage management in Australia, which has influenced subsequent heritage legislation and conservation guidelines and practices in Australia.

Australia ICOMOS has also been responsible for producing the 'Heritage' chapter in national State of the Environment Reports (SoE), to advise the Minister for Environment on ...the current condition of the Australian environment, the pressures on it and the drivers of those pressures.

Australia ICOMOS organises an annual national conference on themes relevant to conservation and heritage in Australia and South East Asia, often on a specific heritage and conservation theme for example on the Australian Capital City, Canberra's, 100th anniversary in 2012.

A collaboration between the Chinese government, the Getty Conservation Institute, and Australia ICOMOS has seen the export of Australian conservation expertise in developing China Principles, ...the Middle Kingdom's statement of conservation philosophy and method that is based on Australia's highly regarded Burra Charter. Australia ICOMOS and the Burra Charter have also been held up as a world standard in Malta.

Historic Environment
- Discipline: History
- Language: English
- Edited by: Tim Winter

Publication details
- History: 1980–present
- Publisher: Australia ICOMOS (Australia)
- Frequency: Triannually

Standard abbreviations
- ISO 4: Hist. Environ.

Indexing
- ISSN: 0726-6715

Links
- Journal homepage; National Library Australia; Australian Heritage Bibliography

== Historic Environment ==
Australia ICOMOS publishes Historic Environment (ISSN 0726-6715), a triannual peer-reviewed academic journal covering cultural heritage and heritage conservation, first published by the Council for the Historic Environment, from 1980 to 1991, then by Australia ICOMOS and the Council for the Historic Environment in 1992 and by Australia ICOMOS alone from 1993. Editions are often on a specific heritage and conservation theme, for example 'Canberra's 100th anniversary' in 2012, and 'Extreme Heritage' which deals with ... managing heritage in the face of climatic extremes, natural disasters and military conflicts in tropical, desert, polar and off-world landscapes.

The journal is the pre-eminent publication on place-based heritage conservation in Australia, is allied to the international organisation ICOMOS, it is cited extensively in conservation literature, records the major heritage conferences in Australia, and has been in publication for over 30 years. The journal aims to bring together ... dynamic, critical interdisciplinary research in the field of cultural heritage and heritage conservation. The journal has an editorial committee of five with lead editor Dr. Tim Winter in 2013.

The journal is accessed online via State Library of New South Wales, and indexed through various index services including RMIT's Australian Heritage Bibliography and the Australian Public Affairs Information Service (APAIS). It is held in over 80 libraries worldwide including all of the Australian State Libraries and major Australian and New Zealand university libraries, and was ranked 'A' by the Australian Research Council Excellence in Research for Australia classification scheme. Australia ICOMOS also publishes the Australia ICOMOS Newsletter (ISSN 0155-3534) on a regular basis.

== Mentoring ==
Australia ICOMOS provides a mentoring program for cultural heritage students as well as architectural students who have completed subjects in architectural conservation and the Australia ICOMOS Victorian Scholarships. Australia ICOMOS projects extend to providing expertise and fundraising for restoration projects in the wider Asia and Pacific region, including the Streetwise Asia School Restoration Project in the Philippines. Australia ICOMOS, and in particular, Richard Mackay AM, have been involved in conservation management advice for the World Heritage Listing of Ankor Wat in Cambodia for many years.
