= Stanford Anderson =

American architectural historian

Stanford O. Anderson
- Born: 1934
- Died: January 5, 2016 (aged 81–82)
- Education: UCBerkeley; Columbia University
- Occupation: Professor
- Employer: Massachusetts Institute of Technology

Stanford Anderson (1934 – January 5, 2016) was an American architectural historian and professor. He taught architectural history, theory, and urban form at the Massachusetts Institute of Technology from 1963 until 1991, and again from 2005 until the end of 2014 upon retirement. As an author, he has been collected by libraries.

== Education ==
Anderson received his architectural degree from the University of California, Berkeley in 1958, and then went on to study as a Fulbright Scholar in Munich in 1961–62. He completed a Ph.D. in art history from Columbia University on Peter Behrens and the New Architecture of Germany: 1900-1917. His main focus of study was architectural theory and early modern architecture in northern Europe. The next 50 years of his career would be dedicated to publishing scholarly works and to teaching in the field of architectural history, theory, and urban studies. He argued that the design process was akin to a research project and that there was an affinity between architecture and history when it comes to methodological rigor. The architects he studied, Peter Behrens, Alvar Aalto, Louis Kahn, and Eladio Dieste among others were positive exemplars of this approach. He was a strong advocate for the power of architecture to shape the urban experience.

== Career ==
Anderson started his career at MIT in 1963. In 1975 he co-founded the History, Theory and Criticism (HTC) section with Wayne Andersen and Henry Millon. The History Theory Criticism section was the first Ph.D. program in a school of architecture in the U.S. Anderson supervised hundreds of theses at MIT, including those of scholars now well known in the field. He served as director of that group from its founding until 1991. From 1991 to 2005, he was the Head of the Department of Architecture and then returned to teach in the HTC section until his retirement.

As Department Head at MIT for nearly 15 years, he brought decades of experience having served on civic boards in Boston, including the Boston Landmarks Commission, Boston Preservation Alliance, MassPort, and the Boston Society of Architects. He was awarded the Topaz Medallion in 2004, reflective of his broad impact on architectural education over the course of his long career.

He designed six architectural projects that include a house for himself and his family located on Deer Isle, Maine.

== Personal life ==
Anderson was born in Redwood Falls, Minnesota. He was a long-time resident of Boston, Massachusetts, first with his wife Lillian Armstrong and then with his second wife Nancy Royal with whom he shared his life for nearly four decades until his death in 2016.

== Major works ==
- On Streets (1978) ISBN 0262510391
- Peter Behrens and a New Architecture for the Twentieth Century (2000) ISBN 0262511304
- Eladio Dieste (1996) ISBN 1568983719
- Aalto and America (2012) ISBN 0300176007
- Jean Krämer Architect : and the Atelier of Peter Behrens (2015) ISBN 3737402264
