= Cultural Heritage Centre for Asia and the Pacific =

The Cultural Heritage Centre for Asia and the Pacific (CHCAP) undertakes research into issues of cultural heritage protection in Asia and the Pacific, including Australia. Based in the Faculty of Arts and Education at Deakin University Melbourne, the Centre is closely connected with UNESCO, including its World Heritage Centre and especially its Asia Pacific Regional Office in Bangkok, Thailand. The Centre is also a member of Forum UNESCO, the Asian Academy for Heritage Management and AusHeritage. The Cultural Heritage Centre's Director is Assoc Prof Andrea Witcomb, with distinguished Centre staff including Professor William Logan, UNESCO Chair in Heritage and Urbanism and Alfred Deakin Professor.
