= R. C. Majumdar =

Indian historian and academician (1888–1980)

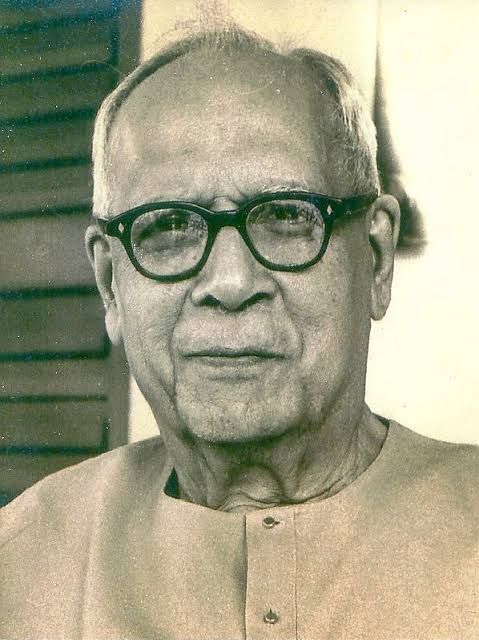
- Majumdar in 1960

4th Vice-Chancellor of the University of Dhaka
- In office 1 January 1937 – 30 June 1942
- Preceded by: A. F. Rahman
- Succeeded by: Mahmud Hasan

Personal details
- Born: Ramesh Chandra Majumdar; 4 December 1888 Khandarpara, Gopalganj, Bengal Presidency, British India
- Died: 11 February 1980 (aged 91) Calcutta, West Bengal, India
- Spouse: Bibha Majumdar
- Relatives: Vina Mazumdar (niece)
- Education: B.A. and M.A., University of Calcutta

Ramesh Chandra Majumdar (known as R. C. Majumdar; 4 December 1888 – 11 February 1980) (Note: H. B. Sarkar's obituary gave 1884 as the year of birth. But 1888 was the accepted date much earlier.) was an Indian historian and professor. He is regarded as belonging to the nationalist school of Indian historiography. Modern scholars view this brand of historiography as "communalist" or "Hindu nationalist".

Majumdar is known most for being the general editor of the eleven-volume The History and Culture of the Indian People (1951–1977), an extensive survey of Indian history published by the Bharatiya Vidya Bhavan. He worked at University of Dhaka for several years, starting as professor of history in 1921, and finally becoming its Vice-Chancellor (1937-1942). Later he remained Principal of the College of Indology, Banares Hindu University (1950-1955), and of College of Indology of Nagpur University (1955-1958). He served as General President of the Indian History Congress, president of the Asiatic Society, Sheriff of Calcutta (1967–68) and vice-president of the International Commission for a History of the Scientific and Cultural Development of Mankind associated with UNESCO.

== Early life and education ==
Majumdar was born in Khandarpara, Gopalganj, Bengal Presidency, British India (now in Bangladesh) on 4 December 1888, to Haladhara Majumdar and Bidhumukhi, who was descended from the family of Raja Rajballabh, an 18th-century zamindar who later served as the diwan of Dhaka. He studied in various schools in Dhaka and Calcutta (now Kolkata), and finally, in 1905, he passed his Entrance Examination from Ravenshaw College, Cuttack. In 1907, he passed F.A. with a first-class scholarship from Surendranath College (then Ripon College) and joined Presidency College, Calcutta. Graduating with a B.A.(Honours) and M.A. (History) in 1909 and 1911, respectively. After completing his M.A., Majumdar briefly pursued a legal career. He passed the first part of the Law Examination and became an articled clerk at the Calcutta High Court, but left the legal profession to pursue teaching and historical research. Subsequently, he won the Premchand Roychand scholarship for his research work in 1913, which led to his thesis: Andhra-Kushana Age.

== Career ==
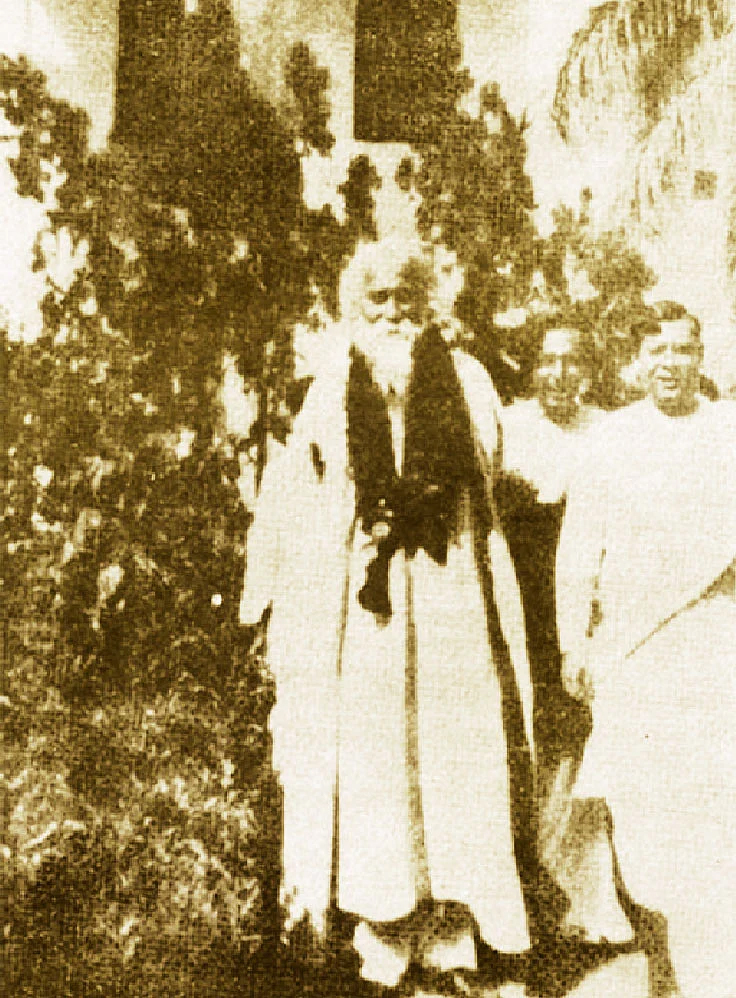
R. C. Majumdar (right) with poet Rabindranath Tagore at Burdhwan House, Dhaka, 1926

Majumdar started his teaching career as a lecturer at Government Teachers' Training College, Dhaka. From 1914, he spent seven years as a professor of history at the University of Calcutta. He got his doctorate for his thesis, Corporate Life in Ancient India. In 1921, he became a professor of history at the newly established University of Dacca. Subsequently, he served, as the head of the Department of History and the Dean of the Faculty of Arts. Between 1924 and 1936, he was Provost of Jagannath Hall, and finally, he remained the Vice-Chancellor of the university, from 1937 to 1942.

From 1950, he was Principal of the College of Indology, Benares Hindu University. In 1955, Majumdar established the College of Indology of Nagpur University (now known as Rashtrasant Tukadoji Maharaj Nagpur University) and joined as Principal. In 1958–59, he taught Indian history at the University of Chicago and the University of Pennsylvania (1958-1959). After his return, he moved back to Calcutta, where he stayed on Bipin Pal Road near Lansdowne Highway, for the rest of his years. He was also the president of the Asiatic Society (1966–68) and the Bangiya Sahitya Parishad (1968–69), and also the Sheriff of Calcutta (1967–68).

Majumdar was elected the General President of the Indian History Congress and also became the vice president of the 'International Commission for a History of the Scientific and Cultural Development of Mankind'(1950–1969) set up by the UNESCO for the history of mankind.

His autobiography in Bengali, Jivaner Smritidipe was published in 1978. He died in Calcutta on 11 February 1980. He was survived by a son and daughter, while a daughter and wife, Bibha Majumdar, had died many years prior. The women's rights activist and scholar Vina Mazumdar was his niece.

== Contributions ==
Majumdar started his research on ancient India. After extensive travels to Southeast Asia and research, he wrote detailed histories of Champa (1927), Suvarnadvipa (1938) and Kambuja Desa (1944). On the initiative of Bharatiya Vidya Bhavan, he took up the mantle of editing a multi-volume tome on Indian history. Starting in 1951, he toiled for twenty-six long years to describe the history of the Indian people from the Vedic Period until the Independence of India in eleven volumes.

When the final volume of The History and Culture of the Indian People (HCIP) was published in 1977, he had turned eighty-eight. He also edited the three-volume history of Bengal published by Dacca University.

The proposal to write on "Freedom movement" with government sponsorship was put forth in 1948 by R. C. Majumdar. In 1952, the Ministry of Education appointed a Board of Editors for the compilation of the History. Majumdar was appointed by the Board as the Director and entrusted with the work of sifting and collecting materials and preparing the draft of the history. However, the Board, consisting of politicians and scholars, was least likely to function harmoniously. Perhaps this was the reason why it was dissolved at the end of 1955. The scheme remained in balance for a year until the government decided to transfer the work on to a single scholar. To the disappointment of Majumdar, the choice of the Ministry of Education fell on one Tara Chand, a historian but also an ex-secretary of the Ministry of Education. Majumdar then decided to write independently The History of the Freedom Movement in India in three volumes.

He also wrote articles for Rashtriya Swayamsevak Sangh (RSS) publication Organiser, but refused to do so after it published pseudo-historical claims about supposed Hindu antecedents of Red Fort and Taj Mahal. Majumdar also declined to agree with K. M. Munshi's theory of an Aryan homeland in India, but apparently agreed to include a "note" (an appendix) after the article on "The Aryan Problem" in HCIP challenging the standard view on Indo-Aryan migration into India.

== Historiography ==
Majumdar was a leading historian of the nationalist school of Indian historiography, whose members were writing against the background of the Indian nationalist movement in the late 19th and early 20th centuries. These scholars insisted on indigenous roots of all major cultural developments, and projected the advent of Turks and Islam as a calamity. Secularist historians that followed in their wake regarded their historiography as a "communalist interpretation" or a "Hindu nationalist interpretation" of history.

Majumdar represented the period after 1200 AD as one of foreign domination, with Muslim rulers oppressing and humiliating the Hindu population. He accepted the British colonialist division of Indian history into Hindu, Muslim and British periods, and regarded the Muslim period as "a 'dark age' of oppression, cultural collapse and decadence". Scholar Supriya Mukherjee sees this as an implicit acceptance of the two-nation theory. Majumdar blamed the division of the Indian subcontinent on the "mistaken and illusory faith" in Hindu–Muslim brotherhood.

The Bharatiya Vidya Bhavan series on History and Culture of Indian People edited by Majumdar is said to have become the mainstay of college texts and a kind of "public common sense". Marxist historian Irfan Habib lamented that "the often uproven hypotheses and inferences that [Majumdar] bequeathed have all become firm truths for a very large number of educated people in India."

Majumdar was in turn highly critical of the secularist historiography that came into prominence after Indian independence. He termed it a "conscious attempt to rewrite the whole chapter of bigotry and intolerance of the Muslim rulers towards Hindu religion". He saw the secularist historians repudiating that Muslim rulers ever broke any Hindu temple, and claiming that they were most tolerant in matters of religion. They exonerated Mahmud of Ghazni's bigotry and fanaticism, and several of them even defended Aurangzeb against Jadunath Sarkar's charge of religious intolerance.

Described by some as “one of the most influential historians of his generation”, his eleven-volume The History and Culture of the Indian People (1951–1977), an extensive survey of Indian history published by the Bharatiya Vidya Bhavan was described by Stolte and Fischer-Tiné as his "monumental publication" while historian John Keay described the series as a "standard work", while anthropologist M. F. Ashley Montagu, described it as the beginning of the "first genuine history of India". Lloyd Rudolph Susanne Hoeber Rudolph found Majumdar to embraced more Hindu nationalist approach towards the end of his career. Christophe Jaffrelot describes him as "the veteran of Indian nationalist historiography whose pro - Hindu bias was allegedly becoming more pronounced". Sabyasachi Bhattacharya described Majumdar to have "usually situated within Hindu nationalist historiography".

Guichard observes that both the Hindu nationalist and secularist interpretations seem polarised. While the secularists fail to admit that the precolonial conflicts could have had religious causes, the Hindu nationalists, in her view, overestimate the strength of precolonial Hindu and Muslim identities.

When the government of India set up an editorial committee to author a history of the freedom struggle of India, he was its principal member. But, following a conflict with the then Education Minister Maulana Abul Kalam Azad on the Sepoy Mutiny, he left the government job and published his own book, The Sepoy Mutiny & Revolt of 1857. According to him, the origins of India's freedom struggle lie in the English-educated Indian middle class, and the freedom struggle started with the Banga Bhanga movement in 1905. His views on the freedom struggle are found in his book History of the Freedom Movement in India. He was an admirer of Swami Vivekananda and Ramakrishna Paramahamsa.

== Works ==
- Corporate Life in Ancient India, Surendra Nath Sen, Calcutta. 1918
- The Early History of Bengal, Dacca, 1924.
- Champa, Ancient Indian Colonies in the Far East, Vol.I, Lahore, 1927. ISBN 0-8364-2802-1.
- Outline of Ancient Indian History. 1927
- Arab Invasion of India 1931.
- Suvarnadvipa, Ancient Indian Colonies in the Far East, Vol.II, Calcutta, 1938.
- The History of Bengal, 1943. ISBN 81-7646-237-3.
- Kambuja Desa Or An Ancient Hindu Colony In Cambodia, Madras, 1944.
- Maharaja Rajballabh, University of Calcutta, 1947.
- An Advanced History of India. London, 1960. ISBN 0-333-90298-X. (Part 1 Online) (Part 2)
- The History and Culture of the Indian People, Bombay, 1951–1977 (in eleven volumes).
- Ancient India, 1977. ISBN 81-208-0436-8.
- History of the Freedom movement in India (in three volumes), Calcutta, ISBN 81-7102-099-2.
- Vakataka – Gupta Age Circa 200–550 A.D., ISBN 81-208-0026-5.
- Main currents of Indian history, ISBN 81-207-1654-X.
- Hindu Colonies in the Far East, Calcutta, 1944, ISBN 99910-0-001-1.
- Classical Accounts of India, 1960.
- Ideas of History in Sanskrit Literature Oxford University Press, 1961.
- Nationalist Historians, Oxford University Press. 1961.
- Sepoy Mutiny and Revolt of 1857, 1963.
- Historiography in Modern India, Asia Publishing House, NY 1970.
- Jibaner Smritidipe (Autobiography) Bengali.
- India and South-East Asia, I.S.P.Q.S. History and Archaeology Series Vol. 6, 1979, ISBN 81-7018-046-5.
- The History of Ancient Lakshadweep, Calcutta, 1979.

== See also ==
- Hem Chandra Raychaudhuri
- Radha Kumud Mukherjee
- K. A. Nilakanta Sastri
- Jadunath Sarkar
