= Jamel Zahiri =

Association football player (born 1985)

Personal information
- Date of birth: 8 November 1985 (age 40)
- Place of birth: Les Pavillons-sous-Bois, France
- Height: 1.70 m (5 ft 7 in)
- Position: Striker

Senior career*
Years	Team	Apps	(Gls)
2003–2004	Angers B		
2004–2007	Angers	23	(0)
2007–2008	Villemomble Sports	33	(5)
2008–2009	Red Star	29	(3)
2009–2011	Orléans	58	(8)
2011	Hassania Agadir	2	(0)
2011–2012	US Ivry	12	(0)
2012–2014	Trélissac	45	(4)
2014–2015	FC Chartres	15	(4)
2015–2017	Aubervilliers	15	(0)
Total		232+	(24+)
- * Club domestic league appearances and goals

Jamel Zahiri (born 8 November 1985) is a former professional footballer who played as a forward.

== Club career ==
Zahiri made one appearance in Ligue 2 for Angers during the 2004–05 season. (Note: Jamel Zahiri – French league stats at LFP – also available in French (archived))

== International career ==
Born in France, Zahiri is of Moroccan descent. He holds both French and Moroccan nationalities.
