= Carolyn Pitts =

American historian (1923–2008)

- Born: 1923
- Died: 2008
- Known for: Historical Preservation of Cape May

Carolyn Pitts (1923 – May 2008) was an American architectural historian. She was a noted advocate for the preservation of historic buildings and specifically fought for National Historic Landmark status for the town of Cape May, New Jersey. As a result of this work, she was described as a "guerilla preservationist."

When Cape May was added to the National Register of Historic Places in 1976, it became the first National Landmark city in the United States.

Pitts retired from the National Park Service at the age of 82, having worked as an architectural historian for a total of 32 years. Her work laid the groundwork for the designation of 2200 National Landmark sites.

== Publications ==
- The Cape May Hand Book (1977), published by the Athenaeum of Philadelphia, was originally distributed free of charge to residents who attended city-hosted preservation workshops. It describes the local architecture of Cape May, including how to maintain and restore it. Over 1,000 copies were distributed.
