= Architectural historian =

Person who studies the history of architecture

Occupation
- Names: Architectural historian
- Occupation type: Profession
- Activity sectors: Architectural history; Art history; Archaeology; History of architecture

Description
- Competencies: Historical knowledge, Heritage conservation and Management skills
- Education required: see professional requirements
- Related jobs: Architect; Art Historian; Archaeologist

An architectural historian is a person who studies and writes about the history of architecture, and is regarded as an authority on it.

== Professional requirements ==
As many architectural historians are employed at universities and other facilities for post-secondary education, in addition to bachelor's degree, it is normal for colleges and universities to require the PhD degree for new full-time hires and a master's degree for part-timers.

=== United States ===
According to Secretary of the Interior's Guidelines the minimum professional qualifications in architectural history are a graduate degree in architectural history, art history, historic preservation, or closely related field, with coursework in American architectural history, or a bachelor's degree in architectural history, art history, historic preservation or closely related field plus one of the following:

- At least two years of full-time experience in research, writing, or teaching in American architectural history or restoration architecture with an academic institution, historical organization or agency, museum, or other professional institution; or
- Substantial contribution through research and publication to the body of scholarly knowledge in the field of American architectural history.

== Profession ==
Professional architectural historians typically work in colleges and universities, archival centers, government agencies, museums, and as freelance writers and consultants. In broad terms, they can be grouped into following two categories:

=== Academic titles ===
Common titles and job descriptions within Universities and research organizations might be as follows:

- Research Coordinator
- Professor in Architectural History
- Senior Lecturer in Architectural History
- Lecturer in Architectural History
- Researcher in Architectural History
- Research Associate in Architectural History
- Research Assistant in Architectural History

=== Non-academic titles ===
Most non-academic positions in architectural history can be grouped into one of the following five categories...

- Preservation Planning and Administration

This employment category is similar to Main Street management listed below and is interrelated with the following historical research and evaluation category. Professionals in the present field are primarily concerned with the planning and administration of preservation programs, providing technical support to the community and attending public meetings. Positions in this category are typically more office based and require more interpersonal skills than the following category.
Principal employers are state and local government agencies, including historic preservation offices and nonprofit organizations.

- Historical Research and Evaluation

This field is the counterpart to preservation planning and administration, above. It involves completing field surveys, conducting research and completing the reports reviewed by state and local government agencies. Compared to preservation planning and administration this field is less office oriented, requiring more on-site work and travel.
Principal employers are architectural firms, cultural resource firms and government agencies.

- Historic Site Management and Curatorship

This field is analogous with museum curatorship but often includes aspects of historical research and evaluation, above and/or historic foundation management and administration, below.
Principal employers are local governments or private, nonprofit organizations.

- Historic Foundation Management and Administration

Positions in this field are rarely entry level and generally require experience in nonprofit organization administration coupled with a background in architectural history. In many cases duties include those of historic site management as well.
Principal employers are historic foundations.

- Main Street Management

Professionals in this field implement and manage downtown revitalization and preservation programs known as Main Street programs. These programs are assisted by the National Trust for Historic Preservation, National Main Street Center. In addition to sharing many of the activities in the preservation planning and administration category, Main Street managers are also involved with marketing and fundraising.
Principal employers are nonprofit organizations.

== Professional organizations ==
- Society of Architectural Historians
- Society for the Study of Architecture in Canada
- The Society of Architectural Historians of Great Britain
- The Society of Architectural Historians, Australia and New Zealand

== Salaries ==
Following are averages of salary ranges as listed in position announcements, excluding additional benefits. The upper salary level listed in such announcements may represent qualifications exceeding the minimum requirements specified for the position.

=== United States ===
According to a survey conducted by the architectural history department, Savannah College of Art and Design, on professional career opportunities in architectural history, was compiled in January 2010 from positions listed January–December 2009, averages of salary ranges in United States are below.

Positions requiring:

- a B.A. in architectural history or a related field and minimal experience: $30,000-$38,500
- an M.A. or a B.A. plus two years of relevant experience, M.A. frequently preferred. Most positions specify an additional two to three years of experience: $40,500-$55,000.
- or preferring an M.A. with a minimum of three to five years of experience: $48,500-$71,000.
- an advanced degree and more than five years of experience: $61,500- $79,000.

== See also ==
- History of architecture
- List of architectural historians
- List of historians
