= Burra Charter =

Charter about conserving Australian heritage places

The Burra Charter: the Australia ICOMOS Charter for Places of Cultural Significance
- Created: 1979; 47 years ago
- Author: ICOMOS Australia
- Purpose: Basic principles and procedures to be followed in the conservation of Australian heritage places

The Burra Charter is a document published by the Australian International Council on Monuments and Sites (ICOMOS) that defines the basic principles and procedures to be followed in the conservation of Australian heritage places. The Charter was first endorsed in 1979 as an Australian adaptation of the Venice Charter, but with the introduction of a new analytical conservation model of heritage assessment that recognised forms of cultural heritage beyond tangible and physical forms. The Charter was the first national heritage document to replace the Venice Charter as the basis of national heritage practice. The Charter has been revised on four occasions since 1979, and has been internationally influential in providing standard guidelines for heritage conservation practice.

Burra Charter
- The Illustrated Burra Charter 2004
- Author: Meredith Walker
- Language: English
- Genre: Non Fiction
- Published: 2013
- Publisher: Australia/ICOMOS Peter Marquis-Kyle
- Publication place: Australia
- Media type: Print (paperback)
- ISBN: 0-9578528-2-7

== History and development ==
In 1979, the Australia ICOMOS Charter for the Conservation of Places of Cultural Significance was adopted at a meeting of Australia ICOMOS (International Council on Monuments and Sites) at the historic mining town of Burra, South Australia. It was given the short title of The Burra Charter.

The Charter accepted the philosophy and concepts of the ICOMOS Venice Charter, but wrote them in a form which would be practical and useful in Australia. The Charter is periodically revised and updated, and the 2004 publication The Illustrated Burra Charter elaborates and explains the principles of the 1999 version in an easy to understand form. In 2013 the Charter was again revised and updated.

The Burra Charter has been adopted by the Australian Heritage Council (December 2004), the Heritage Council of New South Wales (December 2004), the Queensland Heritage Council (January 2005) and the Heritage Council of Victoria (July 2010). It is also recommended by the Heritage Council of Western Australia and the Tasmanian Heritage Council.

== Contents ==
The Burra Charter begins with a series of definitions, such as:

- Cultural significance means aesthetic, historic, scientific, social or spiritual value for past, present or future generations.
- Conservation means all the processes of looking after a place so as to retain its cultural significance.

The types of actions that might be taken in the conservation of a heritage place are defined as :

- Preservation: Maintaining a place in its existing state and preventing further deterioration.
- Restoration: Returning a place to a known earlier state by removing accretions or by reassembling existing elements without the introduction of new material.
- Reconstruction: Returning a place to a known if there is sufficient evidence. and is distinguished from restoration by the introduction of new material.
