= James Charnley House =

Historic house in Chicago, Illinois

- U.S. National Register of Historic Places
- U.S. National Historic Landmark
- U.S. Historic district – Contributing property
- Chicago Landmark
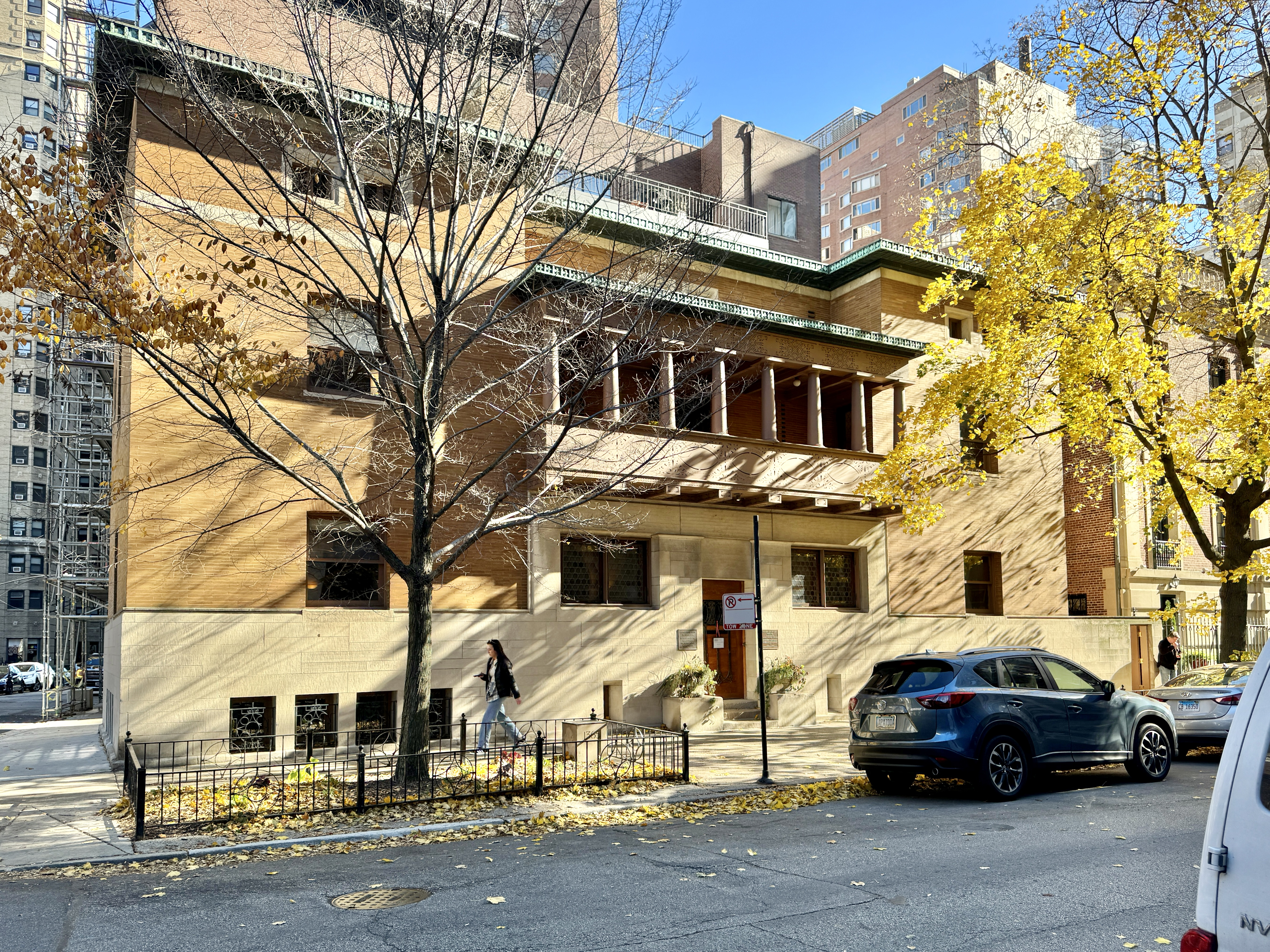
- (2023)

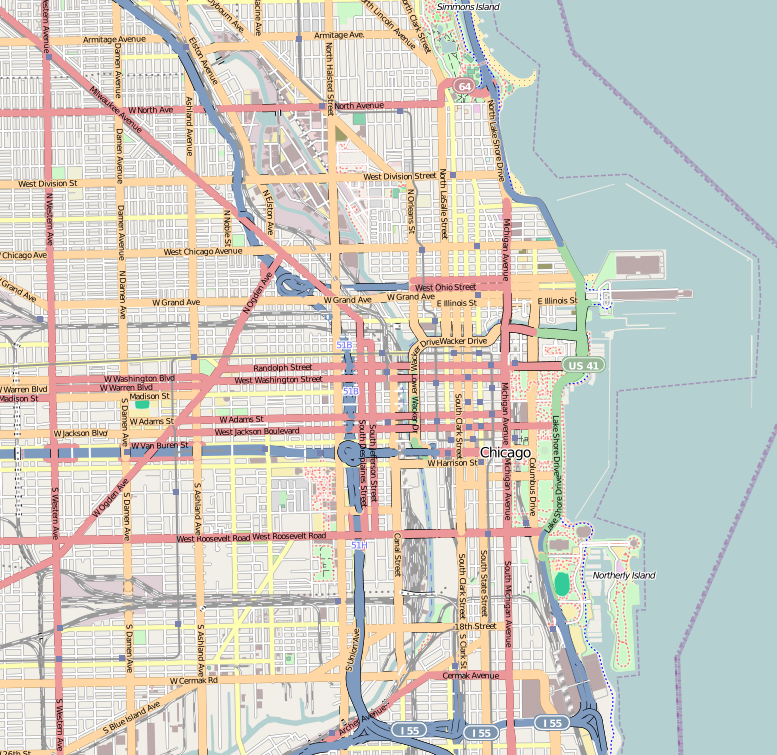
- Location within Central Chicago Location within Illinois Location within the United States
- Interactive map
- Location: 1365 North Astor Street, Chicago, Illinois, U.S.
- Coordinates: 41°54′28″N 87°37′39″W
- Built: 1892
- Architect: Adler & Sullivan
- Part of: Gold Coast Historic District (ID78001121)
- NRHP reference No.: 70000232

Significant dates
- Added to NRHP: April 17, 1970
- Designated NHL: August 6, 1998
- Designated CHICL: August 20, 1972

The James Charnley House (later known as the Charnley–Persky House) is a learned society headquarters and historic house museum at 1365 North Astor Street, along the Gold Coast, in the Near North Side of Chicago in Illinois, United States. Designed by Louis Sullivan and Frank Lloyd Wright of Adler & Sullivan, it was completed in 1892 for the lumber magnate James Charnley. The house is one of Sullivan's few residential works and one of the only buildings where both Sullivan and Wright were significantly involved in the design. It is owned by the Society of Architectural Historians (SAH), which operates the Charnley–Persky House Museum and uses the building as a headquarters. The Charnley–Persky House is designated as a Chicago landmark and a National Historic Landmark.

Charnley bought the site in 1890 and hired Sullivan, a family friend, to design the house. Construction began in July 1891, and the Charnley family moved into the house in May 1892, living there for ten years. Several families bought it in succession during the 20th century. The house was expanded in the mid-1920s and remained a residence until 1986, when the architecture firm Skidmore, Owings and Merrill (SOM) restored the house's original appearance and converted it into the headquarters of the SOM Foundation. The philanthropist Seymour Persky purchased the house in 1995 and donated it to the SAH, which renamed it Charnley–Persky House in his honor.

The Charnley–Persky House has three stories and a basement with a facade of Roman brick and stone. The facade on Astor Street is divided vertically into three parts: a main entrance with a balcony loggia in the center, and brick pavilions on either side. The third story is separated from the lower stories by a limestone course. The interior of the house has decorative woodwork throughout, with built-in bookcases and fireplaces. The first story contains a living room and a dining room, which flank a three-story stair hall at the center. The second and third stories contain bedrooms, and there were originally servants' quarters on the third story as well. In addition, the basement includes utilitarian spaces like a butler's pantry, storage space, and a laundry room.

== Site ==
The Charnley House is located along the Gold Coast, a subsection of the Near North Side neighborhood of Chicago in Illinois, United States. The building carries the street address 1365 North Astor Street (originally 99 Astor Street), at the southeast corner with Schiller Street. The site measures 83 feet (25 m) long on Astor Street to the west and 35 feet (11 m) long on Schiller Street to the north. Because Astor Street runs at an angle to Chicago's street grid, the site is parallelogram-shaped. The house itself measures about 65 by 25 feet (19.8 by 7.6 m) across. There is a courtyard to the south, measuring 20 by 25 feet (6.1 by 7.6 m) across, and a driveway to the east of both the house and the courtyard, measuring 84 by 10 feet (25.6 by 3.0 m). The Palmer Mansion once existed on the same city block to the east.

The building stands on reclaimed land one block from the western shore of Lake Michigan and two blocks south of Lincoln Park. The area north of Oak Street, including the Charnley site, was sandy marshland through the 1870s. The businessman Potter Palmer acquired the Charnley site and several adjacent lakefront parcels from the Roman Catholic Archdiocese of Chicago starting in the late 1870s, with plans to redevelop the land as an upscale residential district. Palmer received permission to reclaim land from Lake Michigan in 1882. Some of the reclaimed land became Palmer Court, a 325-by-550-foot (99 by 168 m) site bounded by Astor Street to the west, Schiller Street to the north, and Banks Street to the south. Palmer sold off the western section of Palmer Court to property owners, including James Charnley, a businessman from a wealthy Philadelphia family.

== History ==
The house is named for James Charnley, who moved to Chicago in 1866 and cofounded the lumber firm Bradner, Charnley & Co. with two family members. Charnley moved to a new residence approximately every other year. He married Helen Douglas, the daughter of Illinois Central Railroad president John Douglas, in October 1872. Over the following decade, Charnley founded several more firms. The family hired the firm of Burnham and Root in 1882 to design a house on Lake Shore Drive. That house, with wide porches facing Lake Michigan, was poorly suited to Chicago's cold winters and ultimately was razed in 1913. James, Helen, and their son Douglas had moved several times by the 1890s.

=== Charnley ownership ===
==== Development ====
In July 1890, the Charnley family bought a site at the southeast corner of Astor and Schiller streets for $27,500 (equivalent to $898,000 in 2025). The site originally measured 83.5 by 125 feet (25.5 by 38.1 m) across. Unlike many of their neighbors, who built detached houses in the middle of their properties, the Charnleys wanted to sell off their land to encourage higher-density development. Shortly after acquiring the land, the family sold part of the site to the Otis family. The Otis tract, measuring 25 feet (7.6 m) wide, was immediately east of where the Charnleys' house was to be built. The Charnleys subsequently sold the easternmost 75 feet (23 m) of their land, east of the Otis tract, to two other families, earning $27,450 (equivalent to $896,300 in 2025) from these sales. Having sold off 80% of their land, the Charnley family retained only the corner plot, which represented a net expenditure of $50 (equivalent to $1,600 in 2025).

The Charnleys hired Louis Sullivan—a family friend who, along with Dankmar Adler, was a partner in the architectural firm of Adler & Sullivan—to design their Astor Street house. Sullivan had previously designed adjacent vacation homes for the Charnleys and himself in Ocean Springs, Mississippi. At the time of the Charnley House's construction, the block had a malt house, some apartment buildings, and some one- or two-family houses. Sullivan was concurrently busy designing the World's Columbian Exposition on Chicago's South Side and the Chicago Stock Exchange Building. As such, he delegated much of the design work to Adler & Sullivan draftsman Frank Lloyd Wright, who sketched out the plans at his house in Oak Park, Illinois. Wright, who at the time typically worked on details for Sullivan's drawings, later attributed the design for the Charnleys' Chicago house entirely to himself. Wright claimed that, during his tenure at Adler & Sullivan (which lasted between 1888 and 1893), neither Sullivan nor Adler built residences.

Adler & Sullivan had prepared plans for a Romanesque Revival residence at Astor and Schiller streets by June 1891; the cost was estimated at $25,000 (equivalent to $808,000 in 2025). Work began that July, and the facade was finished by November. The Charnleys also received the Otis family's permission in November 1891 to construct a party wall between their respective properties.

==== Usage and sale ====
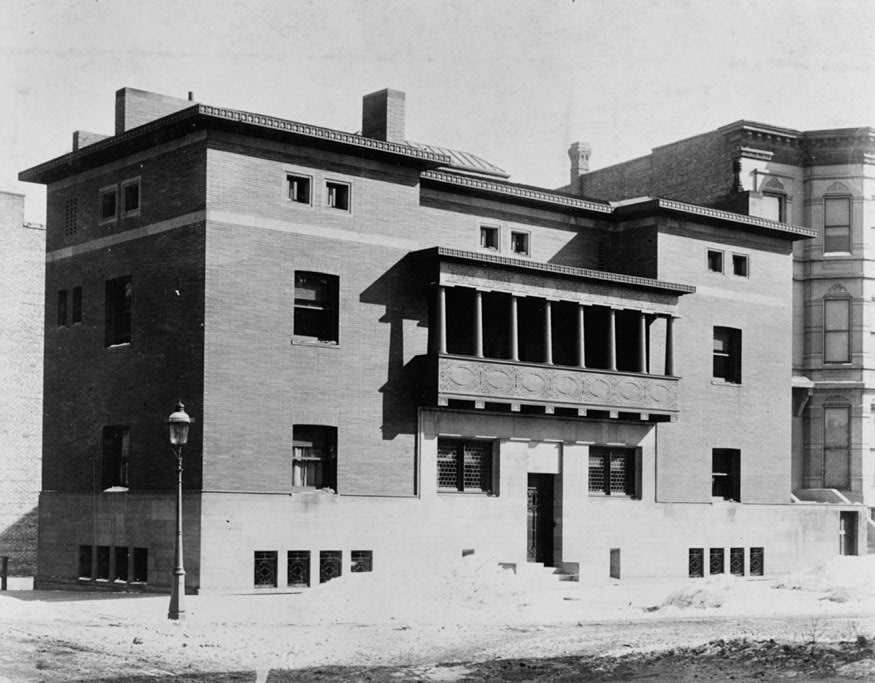
The original symmetrical facade as it appeared in 1892; the building at right was later demolished

The house was completed in May 1892, and the Charnley family lived there for about a decade. The family employed two full-time maids (who had their own bedrooms) and periodically hired other servants as well. From the outset, the house was equipped with utilities such as electricity, which meant the Charnleys did not need a large staff, as was the case with older mansions. Though the Charnley family was prominent enough to be included in Chicago's Blue Book of Selected Names—a list of the city's wealthy residents—they kept a low profile. The family seldom entertained more than a few visitors, and few diary entries, letters, photographs, or original decorations from the house's early years are known to exist.

Due to the limited space available, James and Helen Charnley may have shared one of the second-floor bedrooms, while Helen's brother John used the other second-floor bedroom. Douglas and one of his friends probably shared the third-floor bedroom. Douglas Charnley moved back into the house after graduating from Yale University in 1896, and Charnley's nephew James Charnley Jr. is also recorded as having lived there. The 1900 United States census cites James, Helen, and Douglas Charnley and John Douglas as living there, along with a lumber dealer and two female servants from Sweden. After being diagnosed with a kidney disease, James sold off his companies, retired, and moved to Camden, South Carolina, with Helen in 1902. Douglas Charnley also left the house around that time, moving to various countries.

After moving out, the Charnley family continued to own the building for a decade, renting it to various people, including other members of Chicago's elite. The businessman Joseph Winterbotham and his wife are recorded as having moved into the house by September 1901, living there for two years. The next residents, Ogden Trevor McClurg and his wife, moved into the house in August 1903 and also lived there for two years. Redmond D. Stephens and his wife leased the house in November 1905 after the McClurgs moved out. Stephens bought the house outright in 1911 for $24,000 (equivalent to $602,000 in 2025), and the Stephens family continued to live there until 1918. By then, the house carried the address 1365 Astor Street.

=== Later residential use ===
==== Waller ownership ====
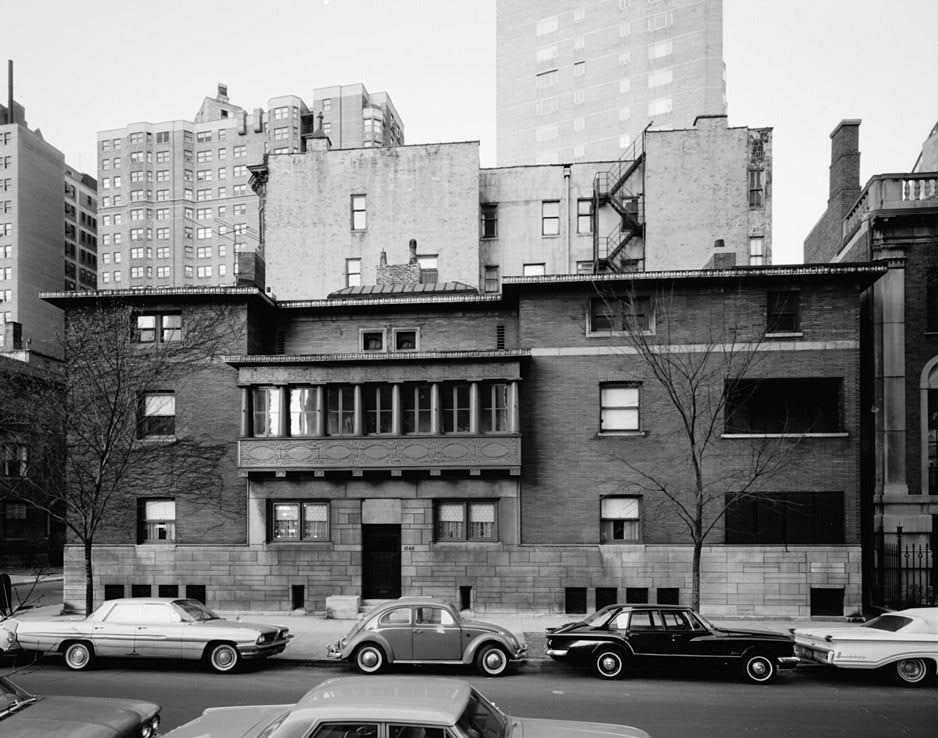
An annex was added to the south (at right) in 1926 but was later removed during restoration.

The Charnley House was purchased in August 1918 by real estate investor James Breckinridge Waller Jr., whose family would own it for half a century. James Waller Jr. already owned the land to the east, which had previously been part of the Charnley family's holdings. Waller Jr. may have purchased the house with the intention of eventually redeveloping the site, though a contemporary Chicago Daily Tribune article did not report on the existence of any such plans. Waller Jr. died at the house in August 1920 and bequeathed the Astor Street house and the adjacent vacant land to his son James B. Waller III. The younger Waller bought a site to the east in 1925 or 1926, adjoining the Binderton Apartments, for $35,000 (equivalent to $509,000 in 2025). Waller III likely considered redeveloping the Binderton Apartments and the Charnley House, but these plans were canceled after the Wall Street crash of 1929.

James Waller III built a southern annex to the house in 1926; the annex's facade was designed in a similar style to the original house. The southern extension included a kitchen on the first floor, three additional bedrooms on the top two floors, and porches on the first and second floors. In addition, the third-story servant rooms and the bathrooms were modified, part of the adjacent vacant lot was converted into a courtyard, and a door was added to the eastern wall. The fireplaces were boarded up during World War II to conserve energy. James III lived in the house until his death in 1949. His widow Nettie Waller retained the residence, putting her efforts into preserving the property at a time when many of Chicago's homes were being redeveloped. Nettie told the Chicago Tribune in 1966 that the surrounding area was "the best neighborhood in the city" and that she did not know where she would relocate if she were to sell the house. By then, the house had garnered large amounts of attention from visitors, including architects and students, and Nettie no longer was surprised when people tried to enter.

==== Smith and Wohlfeil ownership ====
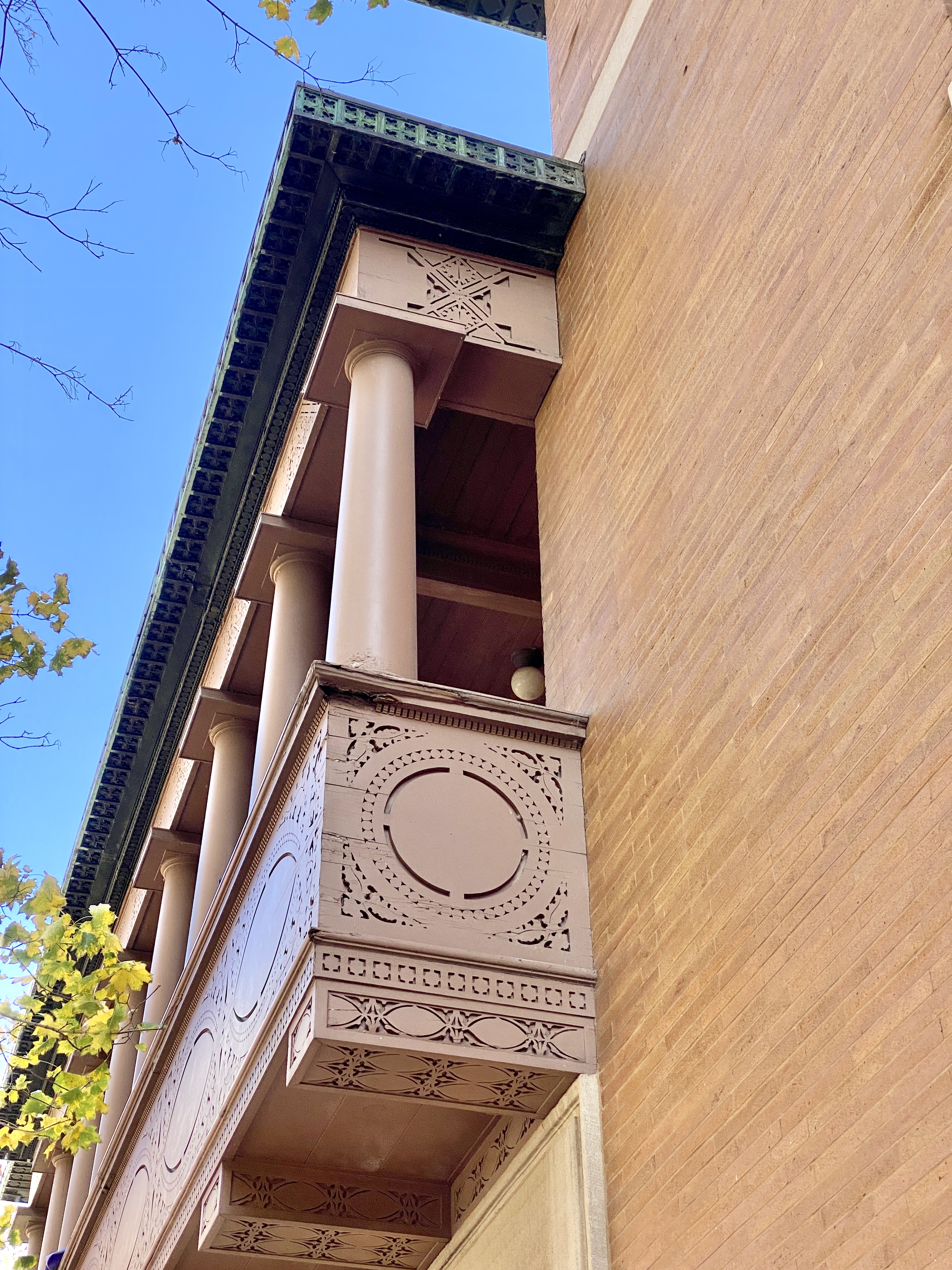
The loggia (balcony) on Astor Street as seen from the side

Nettie sold the house in 1969. The Charnley House's subsequent owner—Hawley L. Smith Jr., who also owned four nearby residences on Schiller Street—spent $50,000 renovating the building and renting it to tenants. By the 1970s, the house's owner planned to construct condominiums east of the house. The Charnley House would have been subdivided, becoming an entryway for the condominium building. This prompted the architect John Vinci to begin looking for someone to buy the house from the developers. The house hosted an interior-design exhibit during 1975. Though the house had been placed for sale by the late 1970s, few people expressed interest in acquiring it.

Lowell Wohlfeil eventually bought the house in 1979 and moved in with the architect Larry Duvall. Wohlfeil hired Vinci to design several alterations to the house. After the house was renovated, Wohlfeil wanted to sell it for $1.2 million. Potential buyers balked at the house's high price and by the fact that Wohlfeil required the buyer to preserve the building. Furthermore, many people expressed interest in buying the house only because they wanted to take part in a viewing and see the interior. After failing to attract many bidders, Wohlfeil had lowered his price to $895,000 by 1983. The house remained unsold for three more years because Wohlfeil was unsatisfied with the bids he received.

=== Institutional use ===
==== SOM and Persky ownership ====
In April 1986, the architectural firm Skidmore, Owings & Merrill (SOM) offered to buy the house. SOM finalized its purchase that year, converting the house into a headquarters for the SOM Foundation. The SOM Foundation's director Léon Krier planned to use the Charnley House as a research studio. Although the house's original architectural drawings had been lost, SOM attempted to restore the house to its original appearance, and John A. Eifler of SOM was commissioned to conduct the restoration. This work included demolishing the southern annex, refinishing the wooden trim, replacing mechanical systems, and removing peeling plaster. In addition, SOM replaced the roof and hired a German artisan to repair the foyer mosaic. The firm spent about $1.7 million on the renovation, which was finished by 1988 or 1989. Afterward, visitors could also make appointments to access the house during weekdays. For its renovation of the Charnley House, SOM received a citation of merit from the American Institute of Architects' (AIA) Chicago chapter in 1990.

The SOM Foundation vacated the Charnley House in 1993, relocating to Michigan Avenue; the foundation said it was losing $100,000 annually just by occupying the house. The foundation announced in 1994 that it planned to sell the house for $2 million. The director of the Chicago Athenaeum museum organized a committee to advocate for the house's preservation. The developer Seymour Persky leased the house in September 1994, acquiring the option to buy it outright. Persky said at the time that he had become enamored with the house because it was similar to the Auditorium Building, which Adler & Sullivan and Wright had designed in the Chicago Loop. Persky originally considered renovating the home into a gallery and adding a curator's apartment.

==== Society of Architectural Historians ownership ====
In December 1994, Persky offered the house to the Society of Architectural Historians (SAH), which at the time was based in Philadelphia. Persky offered to give the SAH money to buy the house if the society agreed to move to Chicago; he said this arrangement would be simpler than donating the house to the society. The SAH's members accepted Persky's gift in January 1995, and Persky provided the SAH with $1.65 million to buy the property. The SAH moved into the house that October, renaming the building the Charnley–Persky House to honor his donation. After acquiring the house, the SAH began raising money to create an endowment fund for the building.

Initially, the SAH did not plan to open the Charnley House to the public as a museum. By the time the SAH moved into the building, it had decided to host tours to raise money; these tours began in April 1996. In addition to moving its headquarters there, the SAH operated the Charnley–Persky House Museum in the house. By the early 2000s, tours of the house's exterior were hosted on Saturdays nine months a year, and the SAH's seven staff members used the Charnley–Persky House's rooms as offices. The SAH received money to waterproof the basement during that decade. When workers were digging trenches for the waterproofing project, they discovered artifacts such as ink bottles, china, and teapots, most of which dated from the 1890s. Subsequently, Lake Forest College conducted archeological excavations at the site in the 2010s.

The Charnley–Persky House's basement was severely damaged during a flood in August 2014, which was caused by a water pipe under a neighboring street bursting during a storm. Within three months of the flood, the SAH had raised $36,000 for a restoration, including a $10,000 matching funds grant from the Weese family and $5,000 each from the Alphawood Foundation and Richard H. Driehaus Foundation. The SAH announced in May 2015 that repairs to the house had been completed. In 2016, the SAH hired Harboe Architects to devise a conservation plan for the house, coinciding with the 125th anniversary of the building's completion. The SAH hosted an architectural-awards gala that year to raise money for the house. Since 2018, the Charnley–Persky House has been part of the Frank Lloyd Wright Trail, a collection of 13 buildings designed by Wright in Illinois.

== Architecture ==
The Charnley–Persky House was designed by Adler & Sullivan, with Louis Sullivan as the architect in charge. Frank Lloyd Wright, who was a draftsman at the firm, also worked on the building's design; it was one of several buildings that he helped design under Sullivan. The Charnley–Persky House was one of 16 residential buildings that Adler & Sullivan designed between 1887 and 1891, and one of a relatively small number of residences that Sullivan designed. It is also the only residential design to which Sullivan and Wright both contributed significantly, and it may be the only surviving design that both men substantially worked on. (Note: Although Wright participated in the design of Adler & Sullivan's Auditorium Building in the Chicago Loop, his work there was limited to interior detail.) Because of Wright's involvement, the Charnley–Persky House differs significantly in many respects from the firm's pre-1890 designs.

Sources disagree on the extent of Sullivan's and Wright's involvement. The New York Times cites Wright as the primary architect, and the historian Arlene Sanderson writes that Wright was probably responsible for the drawings while Sullivan reviewed them. Wright biographer Brendan Gill and Sullivan biographer Hugh Morrison both cite exterior elements—the facade's materials, windows, second-story loggia, and cornice—as having been influenced by Sullivan. The art historian Paul Sprague attributes the Astor Street facade's design and symmetry to Sullivan, while he cites Wright as having designed the entrance and interior. Gill wrote that "almost every authority gives the house to Wright" even though Sullivan was more involved with the design, while a New York Times reporter wrote that the facade evoked the "decisive collaboration of Frank Lloyd Wright". Morrison wrote that the house was "broader in conception than any of Sullivan's other residences" and had visible Wrightian influences. According to The Architectural Review, "Sullivan, effectively, played no part" in the design, which deviated significantly from Sullivan's other work. Wright claimed full credit for the design later on in his career, particularly after Sullivan died.

Although the house was extensively detailed in architectural publications, the original materials and design details themselves are poorly documented, and Adler & Sullivan's original records have been destroyed by fire. Wright is cited as having described the building as the United States' "first modern house", though the author Rebecca Graff says that this quote originated in a Prairie School Review editorial. The design includes elements of Wright's later Prairie style, such as a brick-and-limestone facade, horizontal massing, rectangular forms, and an overhanging roof. After using cubic volumes in the house's massing, Wright used a similar design principle in his later, independent work.

=== Facade ===
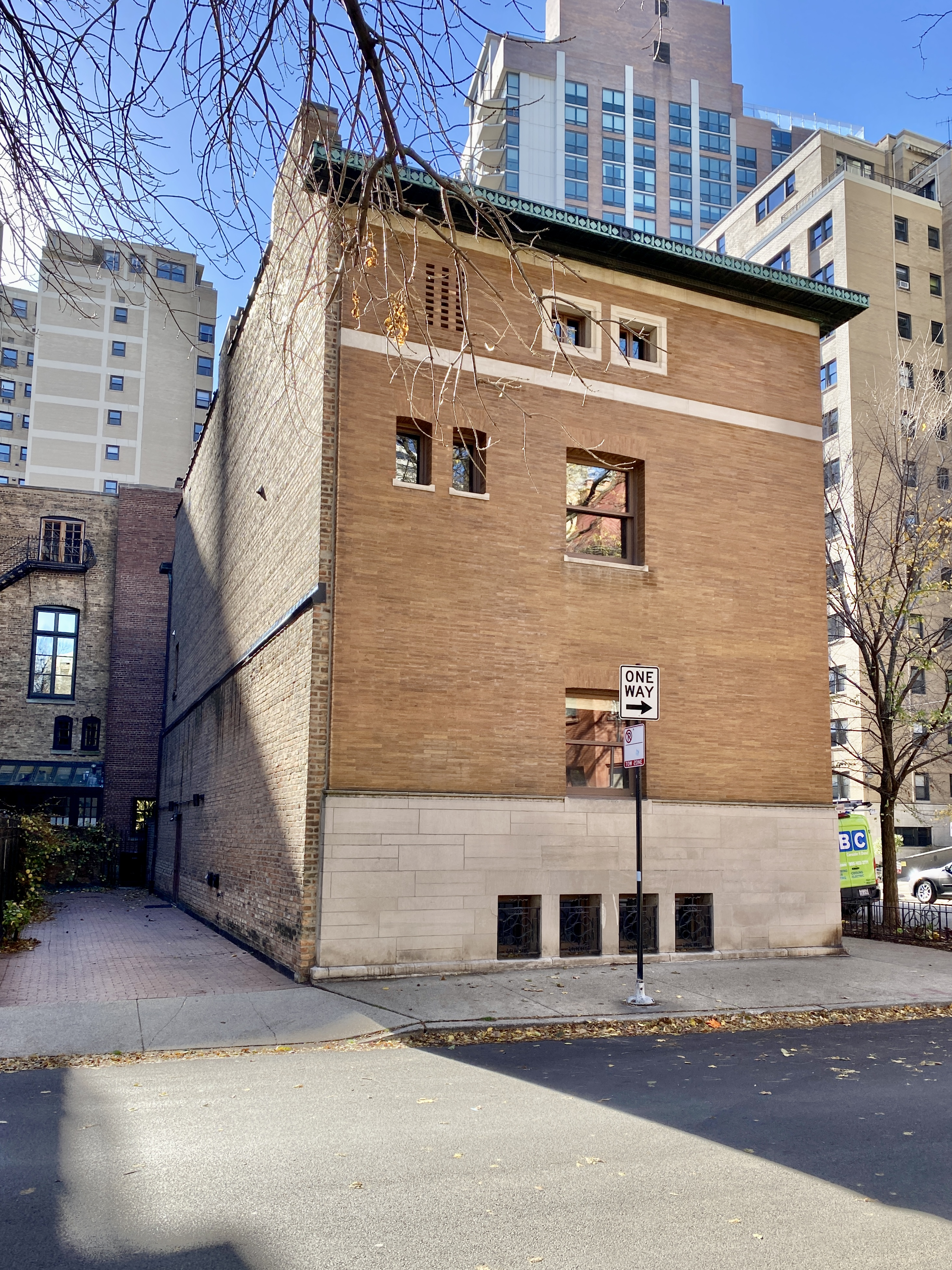
The northern elevation on Schiller Street

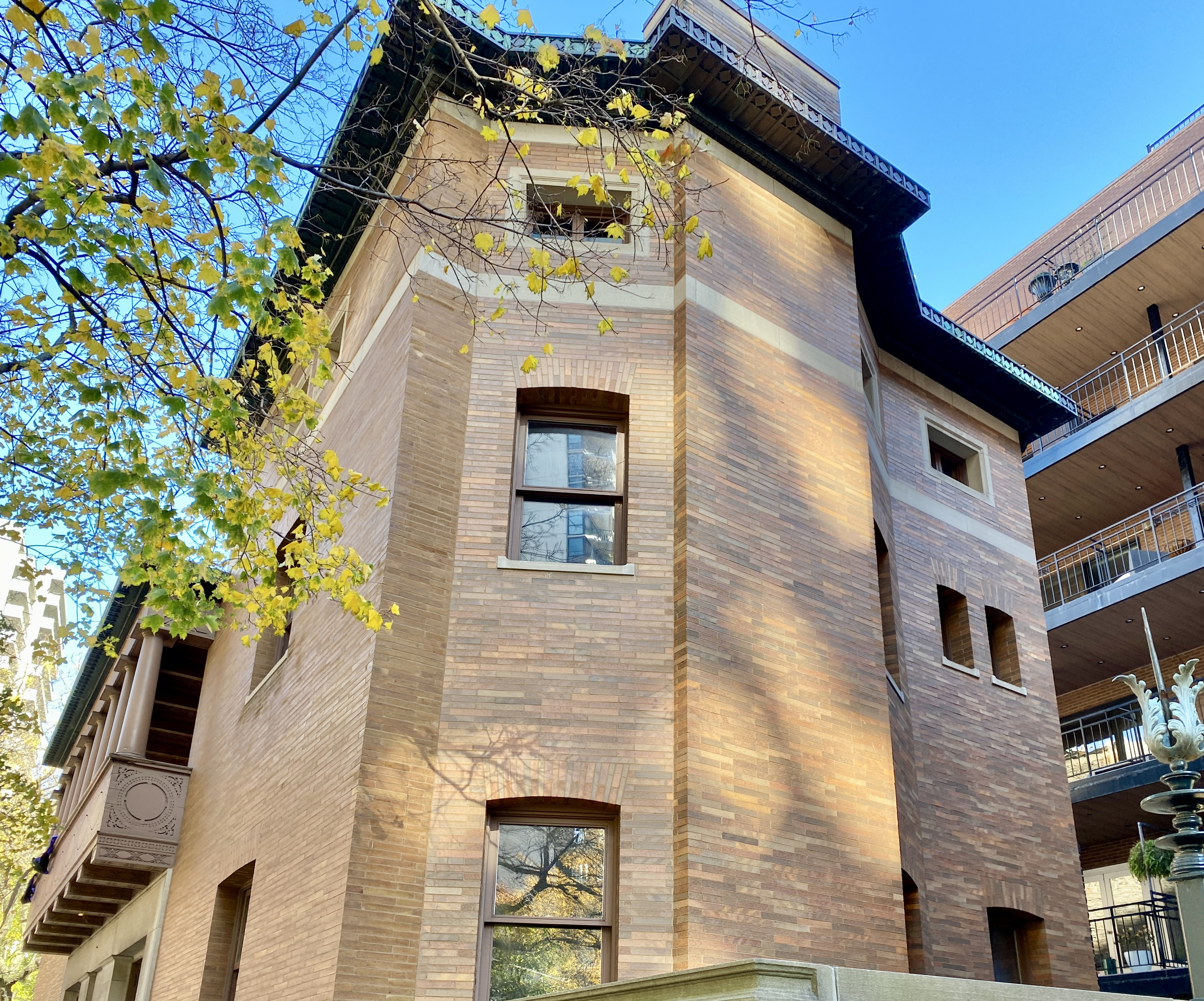
The southern elevation

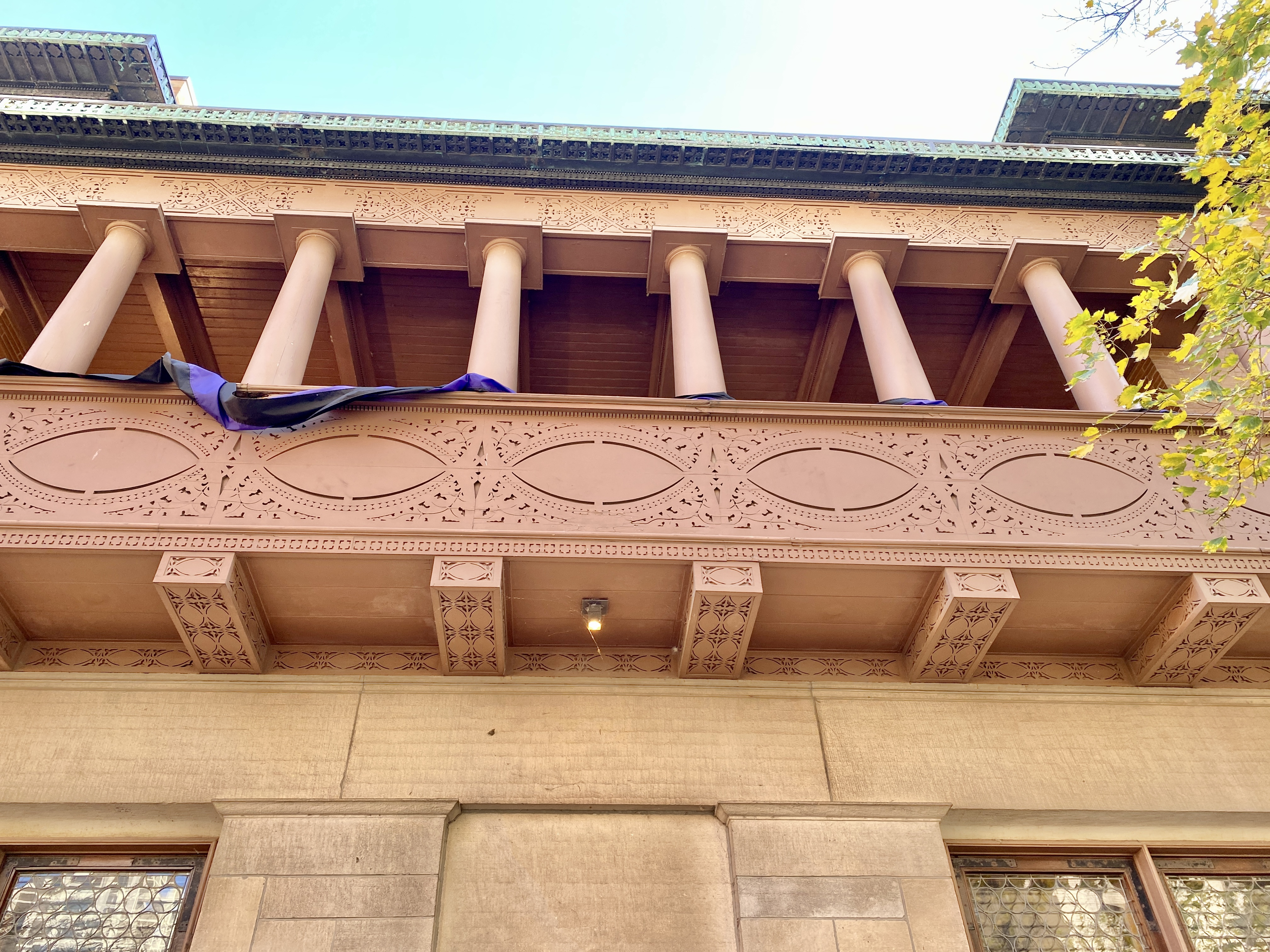
Detail of the loggia on the eastern elevation

The Charnley House's three-story facade is, like many contemporary buildings, divided horizontally into three sections: a base, midsection, and capital. The house has a raised basement made of limestone or ashlar. From the first story upward, the building is clad in Roman brick; the brick was originally tinted yellow or light orange, but it was darkened during the 1980s renovation. Limestone courses run horizontally above the second and third stories. Ventilation grilles are embedded into the facade at the third story, which is much shorter than the first and second stories. A copper cornice runs above the third story. Above it is the copper roof, with four low chimneys, which appears nearly flat due to its very shallow pitch. The chimneys are clustered around the house's southern and northern ends.

In contrast to contemporary Chicago residences, where the decorations were spread across the facade, the ornamentation on the Charnley–Persky House is limited to the second-floor balcony on Astor Street and on the cornice above the third story. The windows lack frames and are decorated with fretwork, similar to the windows in Sullivan's other buildings. Wright wrote that the Charnley House's design was the first in which he "sensed the decorative value of the plain surface—that is to say—of the flat plane as such."

==== Astor Street elevation ====
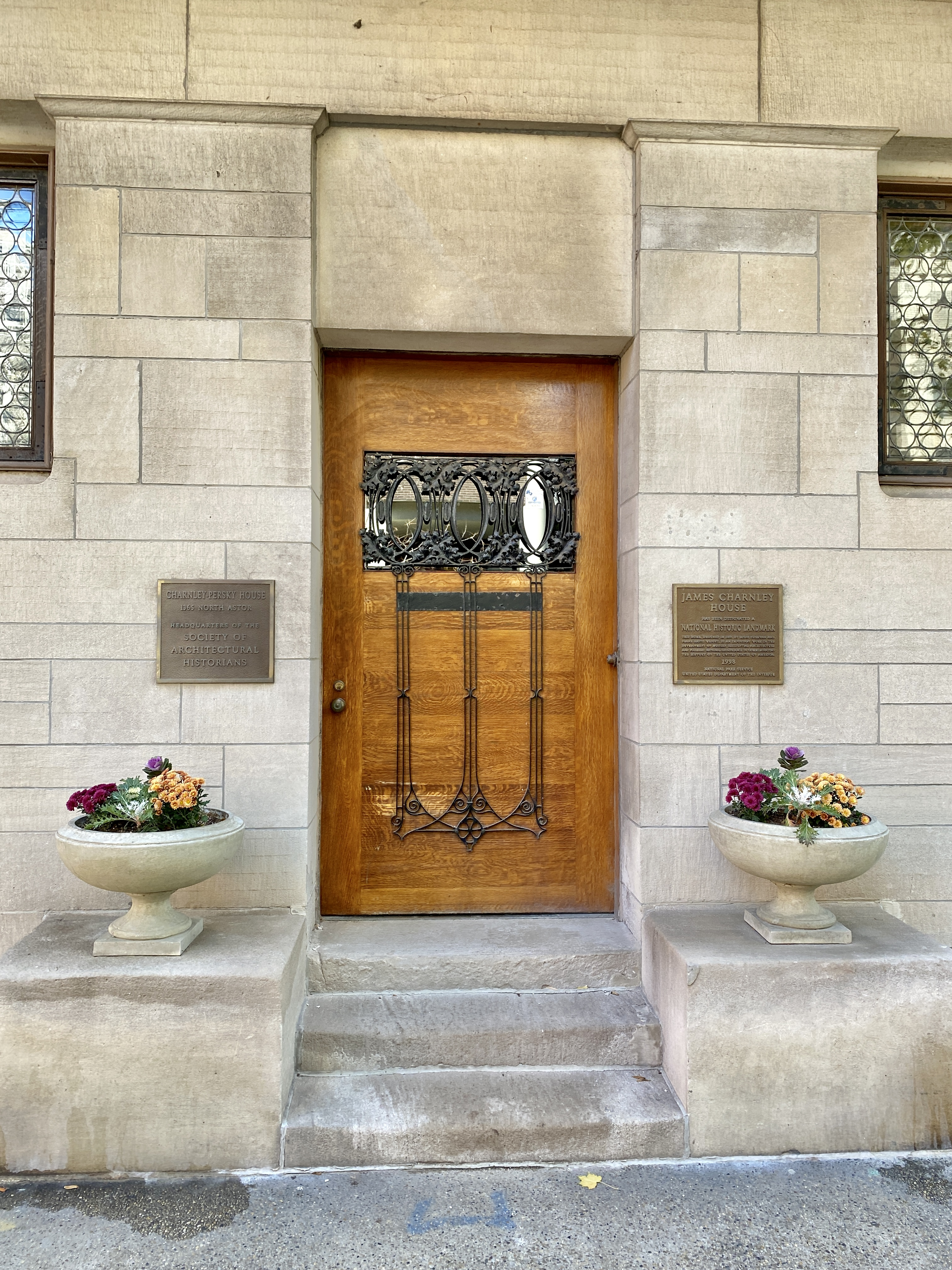
The front door

The primary elevation of the Charnley–Persky House's facade is to the west, along Astor Street, and is divided into three vertical bays of unequal width. The basement and the center bay's first floor are both clad in limestone, creating an enframement around the first-story entrance. The first through third stories of the outer bays, and the third story of the center bay, are clad with brick. The basement has four pairs of square windows, each with iron grilles.

At the middle of the center bay, a limestone stoop with three steps ascends to an oak door with a metal grille. There are casement windows on either side of the door, which have amber art glass panes bearing circular motifs. On the second story, a wooden loggia (also described as a balcony) protrudes over the main entrance, sheltering it. The loggia, made of stained wood, has a balustrade and either Doric or Tuscan-style columns. The loggia decorations are characteristic of Sullivan's work and include bead, oval, and foliate motifs on the balustrade and frieze. Above the loggia are a frieze and a copper cornice. The first- and second-story windows in the outer bays have plain rectangular windows topped by brick lintels. On the third story, all three bays have two square casement windows each.

==== Other elevations ====
The northern elevation on Schiller Street is clad with gray limestone and yellow brick in a similar manner to the western elevation. The limestone basement has four square windows with grilles, while the first and second floors each have a large casement window at the middle of the facade. The third story of the northern elevation has small limestone windows. The eastern elevation has a plain brick facade with a single window on the southern portion of the second story. Though the eastern elevation was intended as a party wall, no other structure was ever built adjacent to the house's eastern elevation; a courtyard separates the house from the nearest building to the east. The southern elevation is divided into a protruding center bay with casement windows, in addition to recessed outer bays. Within the southern elevation's outer bays, the first and second stories have double-hung windows, while the third story has casement windows.

=== Interior ===
The interior has 4,500 square feet (420 m^{2}) of space across three stories and a basement. At its greatest extent in the 1940s, the house had eleven rooms, although it was reduced to eight rooms following the 1980s renovation. Lowell Wohlfeil, a former owner of the house, described the interior as "thin and small", in contrast to the wide appearance of the exterior. Although Sullivan's biographer David van Zanten described the interiors as comprising "a single, grand enfilade", the architectural historian Robert Twombly disputes van Zanten's conclusion that the rooms were intentionally laid out in that manner.

The first floor contains the Charnley–Persky House's family rooms and several servants' rooms. There are two family rooms (the living room–library and dining room), much fewer than in other mansions of the time. The first story is arranged in a tripartite plan, with the living room–library and dining room on opposite ends of the stair hall. The upper stories are devoted to bedrooms and servants' quarters. There are three main bedrooms, each with their own fireplaces, bathrooms, and closets. The main rooms are generally decorated with oak woodwork, while pine is used for ancillary spaces like closets. When the building was completed, it had modern utilities like electricity and a central heating system, though the Charnleys also equipped the principal rooms with fireplaces.

The rooms are arranged around a stair hall, which occupies the center third of the house. The stair hall is abnormally large compared with contemporary American townhouses, which usually had compact stair halls to maximize usable space. The stair hall extends through the third story, acting as an atrium, which is flanked by rooms on either side. A reporter for the Financial Times suggested that the stair hall might have been an example of Wright "beginning to break up 'the box'". There is a second stairway in the rear, which was used by servants.

==== First story ====
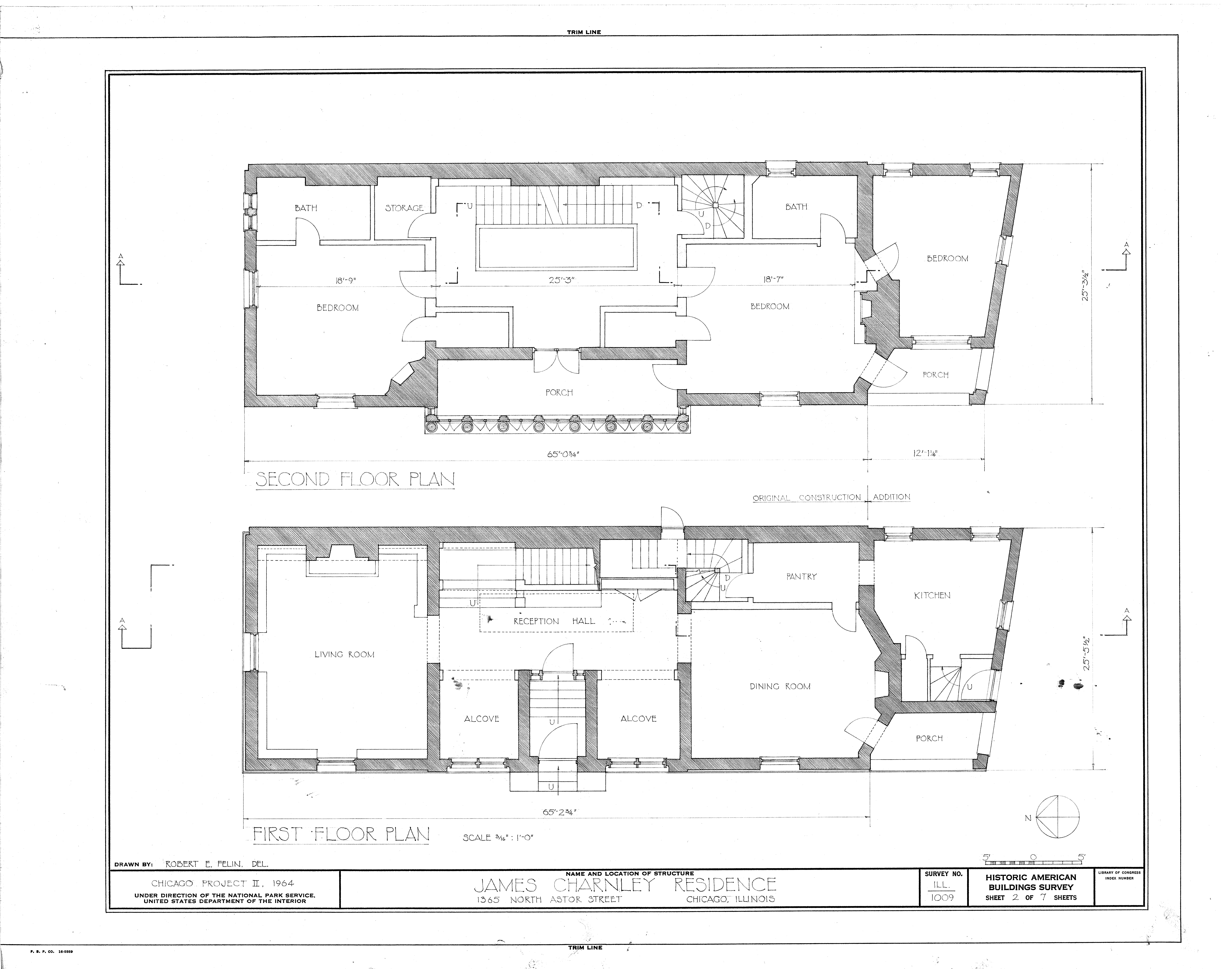
Floor plan of the first floor (bottom) and second floor (top)

Just inside the Charnley–Persky House's front door is a foyer with oak panels and a green, white, and brown tiled floor. Five steps ascend to a door leading to the stair hall. The stair hall itself measures 8 feet (2.4 m) east–west and 24 feet (7.3 m) north–south. A fireplace is located on the eastern wall of the stair hall, opposite the foyer's door. The fireplace hearth is surrounded by multicolored ovals, while the rest of the hall has beige plaster walls. Archways lead north and south to adjacent rooms, and arched alcoves with seats flank the door to the west and the fireplace to the east. The archways in the hall contrast with the rectangular windows on the house's facade. The stair is concealed behind a wall and is accessed by an archway on one side of the fireplace.

There are no other doors separating the rooms on the first floor. North of the stair hall is the living room–library, which combined the functions of a typical mansion's library, sitting room, and parlor. The room measures 18 by 22 feet (5.5 by 6.7 m) across and has 4.5-foot-high (1.4 m) bookcases on all four walls. The living room's north and east walls have built-in bookcases; the south wall's bookcase abuts an archway from the stair hall; and the east wall's bookcases flank a fireplace with a marble surround. The cornices at the top of each wall are made of quarter-sawn oak.

South of the stair hall is the dining room, measuring 18 by 15.5 feet (5.5 by 4.7 m) across, with a dark mahogany wainscoting. On the dining room's southern wall is an outwardly angled bay, as well as a fireplace with a marble surround and a mosaic-tile hearth. The tops of the walls have mahogany cornices, similar to those in the living room–library. There is a sink, dumbwaiter, and cupboards in the butler's pantry just east of the dining room. The dumbwaiter descends to a similar pantry in the basement.

==== Other stories ====
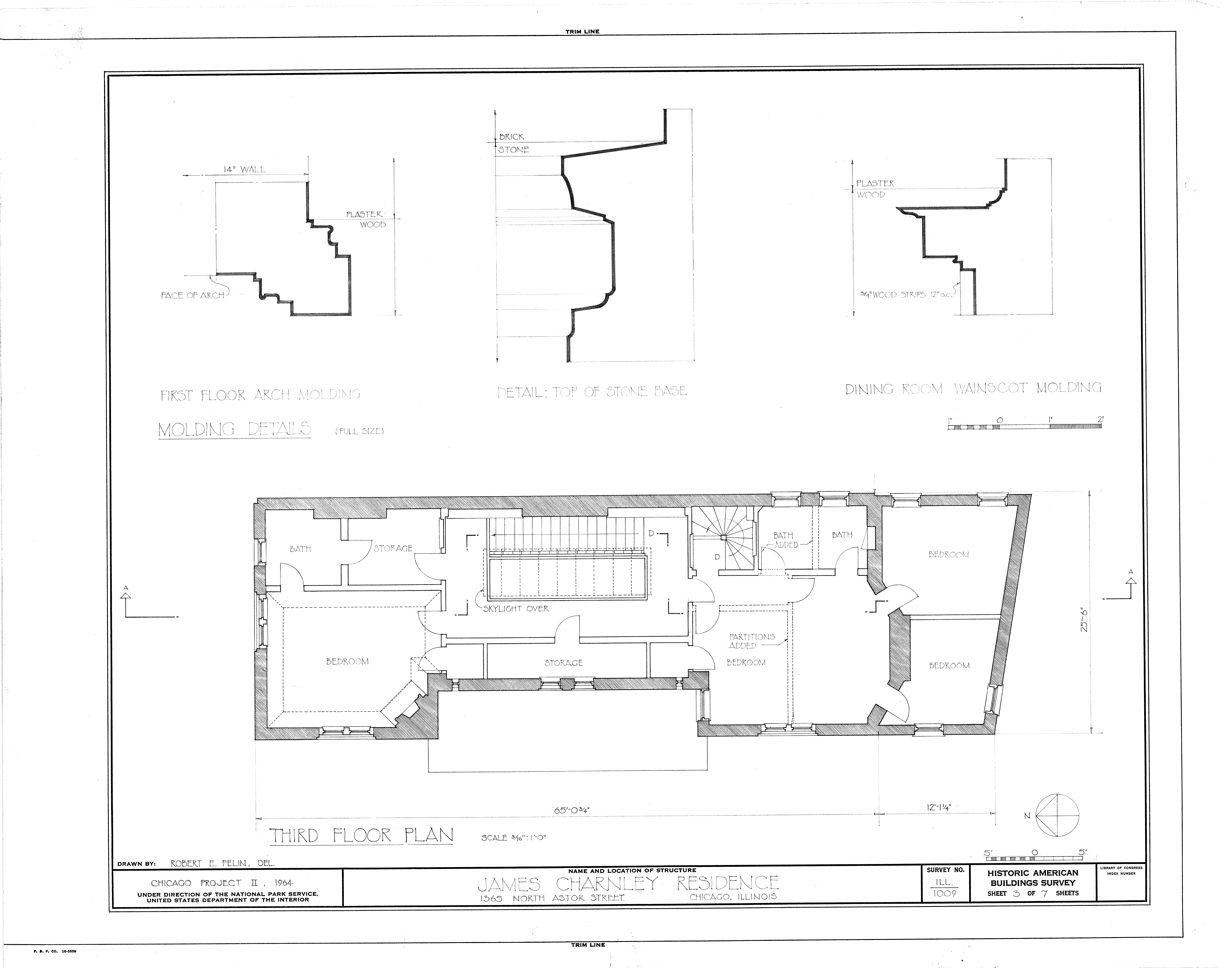
Floor plan of the third floor

The second story has two bedrooms, two bathrooms, and closets; the loggia to the west is accessed from both the stair hall and the southern bedroom. A screen (or grille) of vertical wooden rods separates the stairs from the rest of the stair hall. At the middle of the hall is a light well with a carved balustrade. An art-glass double door on the stair hall's western wall, flanked by inglenooks, leads to the outdoor loggia along Astor Street. The second-floor stair hall also has one frosted-glass window at either end and two rectangular indentations on its eastern wall. The bedrooms to the north and south have oak trim, various windows, closets with built-in furniture, and fireplaces. The southern bedroom, measuring 16 by 18 feet (4.9 by 5.5 m), was used as the master bedroom; its fireplace mantel is made of birdseye maple and yellow tiles. The master suite's bathroom has the only east-facing window in the entire house. The northern bedroom, measuring 15 by 17 feet (4.6 by 5.2 m), has a walnut fireplace mantel with mauve tiles, and it formerly also had a bathroom. Both bedrooms' western walls have grilles facing the balconies.

The third story was built with another bedroom, a linen closet, and two maids' bedrooms. The stair hall has an oak balustrade at the third story. Similarly to the second floor, the stair hall has one frosted-glass window at either end and two rectangular indentations on its eastern wall. A skylight illuminates the third story. The linen closet is just west of the stair hall, with built-in drawers flanking a pair of windows. To the north of the third-floor stair hall is a bedroom with four windows and an adjoining storage room (originally a bathroom). The northern third-story bedroom has a fireplace with an oak-and-terracotta tile hearth. To the south of the stair hall were originally two servants' bedrooms, which were later merged. The servants' bedrooms, unusually large for their time, shared a bathroom. The southern third-story room also has a storage room (originally a bathroom), which connects with the service stair.

The basement is accessed by the service staircase and includes utilitarian spaces like a butler's pantry, storage space, and a laundry room. The eastern portion of the basement includes a kitchen with a sink, a stove hood, and a dumbwaiter from the first-floor butler's pantry. The service kitchen has a window and a door leading outside to a courtyard. The southwestern corner of the basement has a bathroom, which was originally used to store food. There is also a wine cellar under the entrance stoop, as well as a coal-delivery and storage vault immediately north of this. The basement also has a square storage room at its northern end, which originally functioned as a laundry room. In addition, the basement has radiators on the ceiling (which could heat the rooms above), and it originally had a wooden floor, which was replaced with concrete in the 1980s.

== Impact ==
=== Reception and media ===
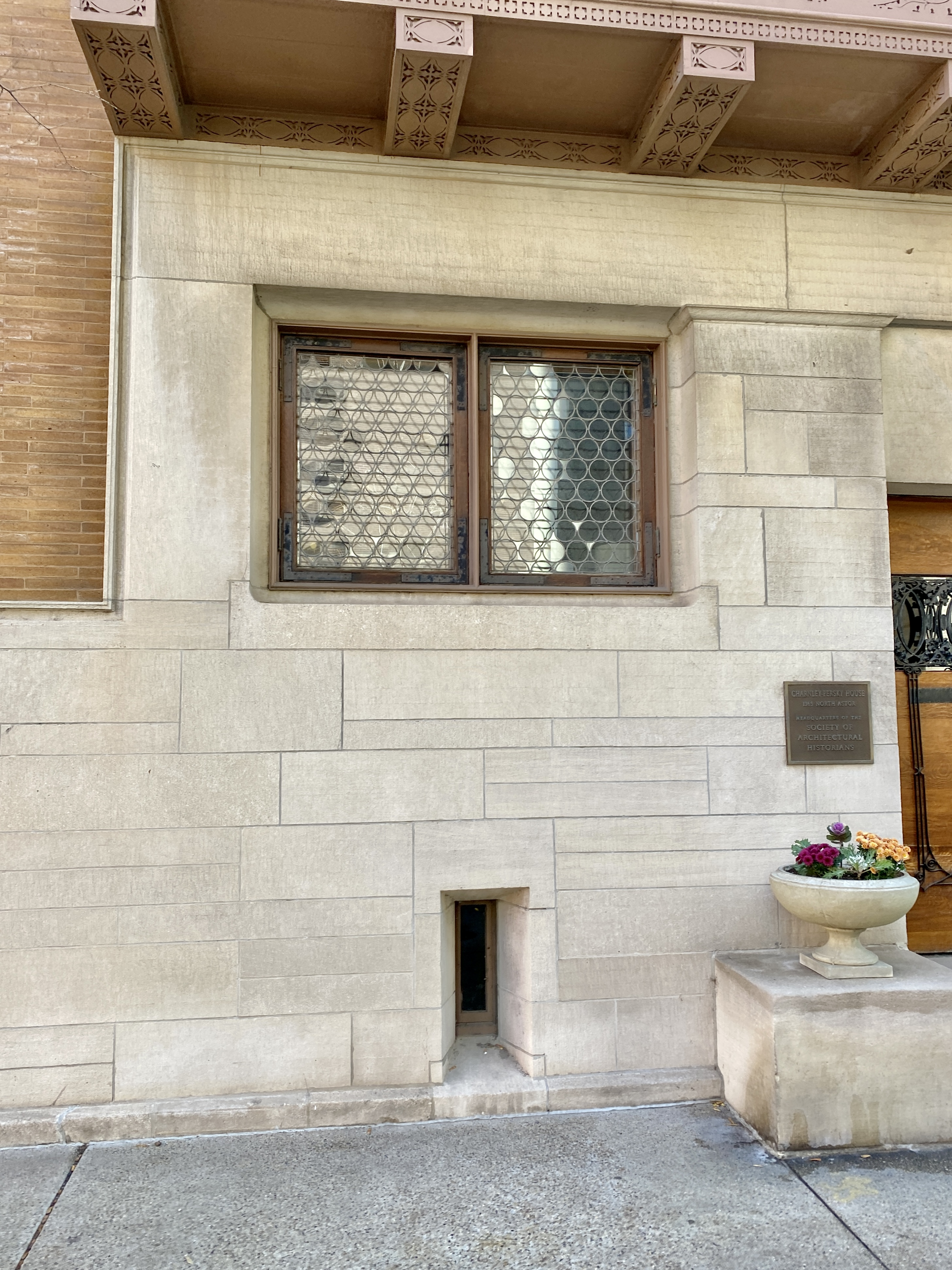
A window next to the main entrance on Astor Street

When the Charnley House was finished, it appeared in architectural publications such as Inland Architect, Northwestern Architect, The American Architect, and Architectural Record. The house's design was extensively covered in architectural publications starting in the 1930s, although after 1970, many architectural publications did not pay much attention to the design. An article from the Springfield Daily Republican called it "a little masterpiece" from Wright's time as an apprentice with Adler & Sullivan, while the Chicago Tribune wrote in 1954 that the house could be considered as either an early example of Wright's style or a more well-developed work by Sullivan. The Tribune further wrote in 1972 that architectural experts considered the house "one of the earliest examples of Wright's genius". The historian Robert McCarter said in 1996 that the house was "one of the greatest works of architecture of its period", ranking it above similar works by firms like McKim, Mead & White.

Brendan Gill characterized the interior layout as having a "rigid matter-of-factness", broken up only by the central stair hall. Elizabeth Collins Cromley wrote in 2004 that, despite the house's corner location, it "seems withdrawn, its personality reserved for interior expression alone". The same year, an article in The New York Times characterized the exterior as having "made no concessions to its fussier Victorian neighbors" and that the interior design "signals a love of abstract forms for their own sake". The Associated Press described the house as a "pivotal work of modern architecture", and the Chicago Tribune similarly wrote in 2015 that the building was an important modern-style design that blended elements of Wright's simplistic design and Sullivan's decorations. A reporter for the Financial Times suggested that the stair hall might have been an example of Wright "beginning to break up 'the box'".

Dominican University in River Forest, Illinois, contains a sculptured wall with a depiction of the Charnley–Persky House. The house and 28 other buildings in Chicago were documented in 1965 as part of the Historic American Buildings Survey. The building was the subject of the 2004 book The Charnley House, and the 2010s archeological studies at the house are described in Rebecca Graff's 2020 book Disposing of Modernity. In addition, pictures of the house were displayed in the visitor center at Taliesin, Wright's home and studio in Wisconsin, during 2012.

=== Landmark designations ===
Chicago's Commission on Architectural Landmarks designated the Charnley House as one of the city's first landmarks in 1958; this designation had no legal force. The American Institute of Architects' Chicago chapter gave the building's owners a plaque in 1960, recognizing the building as a landmark. In 1972, the Commission on Chicago Historical and Architectural Landmarks held hearings on the possibility of designating the building as an official Chicago Landmark. The house was designated a landmark on August 20, 1972, despite its owner's opposition. The Charnley–Persky House is listed on the National Register of Historic Places (NRHP), having been designated in 1970. It was re-added to the NRHP as a National Historic Landmark (NHL) in 1998, becoming one of several buildings by either Adler & Sullivan or Wright to be granted NHL designation. (Note: Adler & Sullivan's Auditorium Building, Wainwright Building, and Guaranty Building are also designated as NHLs. National Historic Landmarks designed by Sullivan alone include the Carson Pirie Scott Building, Bayard–Condict Building, Harold C. Bradley House, Farmers and Merchants Union Bank, Merchants' National Bank, National Farmers' Bank of Owatonna, and People's Federal Savings and Loan Association. Wright also designed more than two dozen National Historic Landmarks on his own.) The house is also part of the Astor Street District, a Chicago Landmark district, and the Gold Coast Historic District, an NRHP district.

== See also ==
- List of Frank Lloyd Wright works
- List of Chicago Landmarks
- List of National Historic Landmarks in Illinois
- National Register of Historic Places listings in Central Chicago
