= Astor Street District =

Historic district in Chicago, Illinois

Coordinates: 41.9078°N 87.6276°W

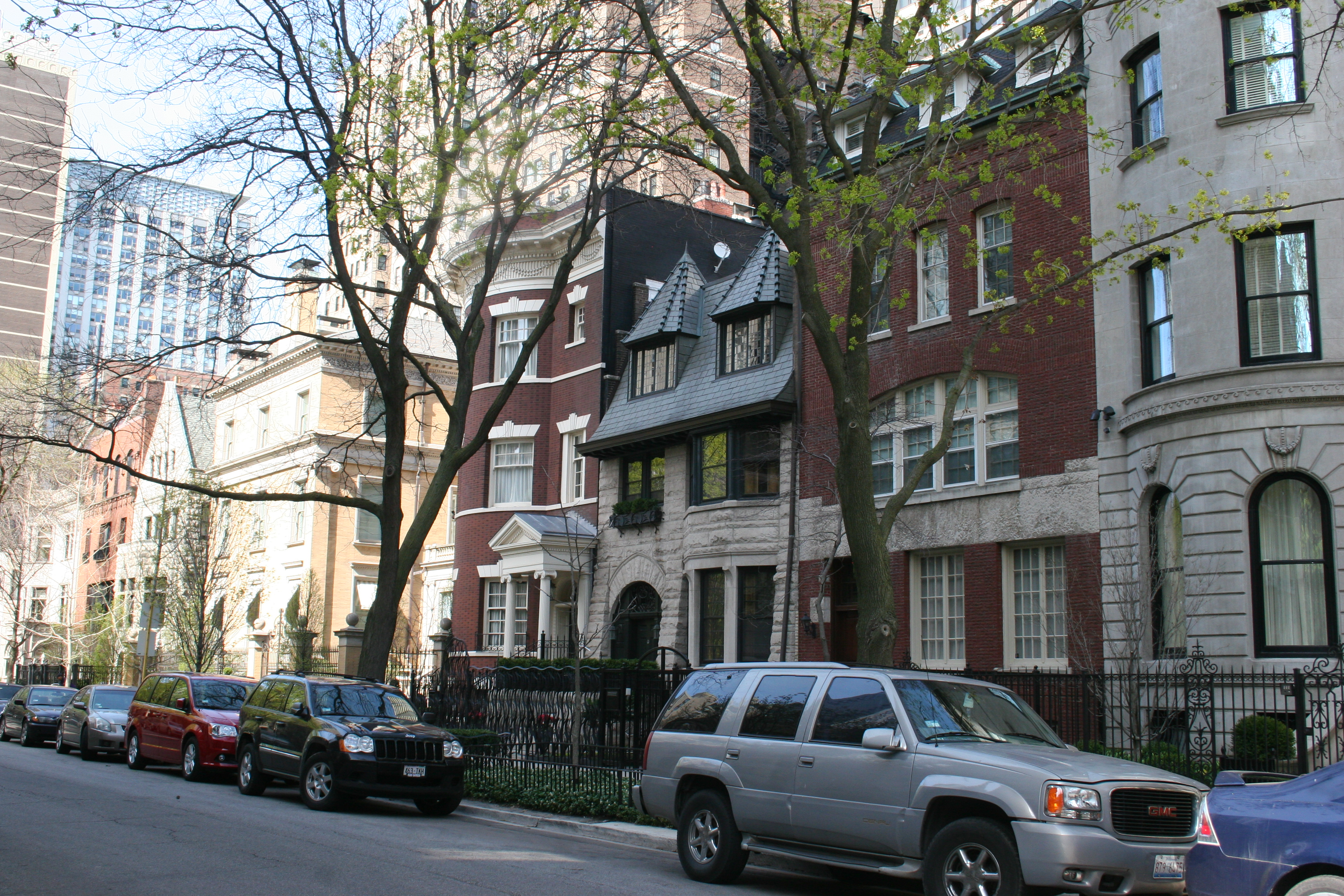
East side of Astor Street

The Astor Street District is a historic district in Central Chicago, Illinois.

Constructed over a period of more than 100 years, the buildings along Astor Street reflect the fashionable styles favored by their original high-society residents. The numerous 19th-century houses are designed in a variety of historical revival styles, and are interspersed with apartment buildings and townhouses.

It was designated a Chicago Landmark on December 19, 1975.

== History ==
=== Early development ===
Astor Street is named after John Jacob Astor, one of the richest citizens of the United States. Although he never lived in Chicago, the street was named to honor his achievements. At the time of his death in 1848 his estate was worth $20 million (equivalent to $744 million in 2025). Astor was the founder of the American Fur Company and an investor in New York City real estate. His name gave a luster to the area.

Potter Palmer was one of the early landowners in the neighborhood. While most of high society lived in mansions on Prairie Avenue, Palmer began to buy up land on the north end, which was only lightly populated and still mostly swamp after the Great Chicago Fire in 1871. Interest in the area increased when Lake Shore Drive was opened in 1875 from North Avenue to Oak Street, and a favorite Sunday afternoon pastime became a ride along the lakefront. By 1882 the Palmers had started building one of the first mansions on the drive in the block between Schiller and Division. The Palmers' Gothic castle sat at 1350 N Lake Shore Drive became the center of Chicago's high society. Bertha Palmer stocked the home with an extensive collection of Impressionist paintings, helping create a market for the then avant-garde works and which later formed the core of the Art Institute's collection.

Other wealthy Chicago families followed the Palmers. Lumber, iron, liquor and other magnates flocked to the area and built lavish homes. Residents included Kenneth Sawyer Goodman, the playwright after whom The Goodman Theatre is named; Robert Todd Lincoln, the only surviving child of Abraham and Mary Todd Lincoln; and Albert F. Madlener, a successful liquor wholesaler. The Madlener home now houses the Graham Foundation for Advanced Studies in the Fine Arts.

Within 20 years of the opening of Lake Shore Drive, Astor Street was fully developed, filled with city houses abutting one another on their narrow sites. This limitations on land use also brought high-rise apartment buildings to the neighborhood, made fashionable by second generation Palmers.

== Architecture ==
The homes in the district are primarily Queen Anne, Richardsonian Romanesque and the Georgian Revival styles.

=== James Charnley House ===
The James Charnley House, now called the Charnley–Persky House, is a key building in the historic district. Designed by Louis Sullivan between 1890-92, it is considered one of the first modern residences in the United States. A young Frank Lloyd Wright, who was a junior draftsman in Sullivan's office at the time, worked on the project as well. Featuring a plain brick facade with ornamentation that is unique among all other houses, it is lavishly decorated inside, in a style that is typical of Sullivan's work. The home today houses the Society of Architectural Historians, who give tours of the structure.

The home is a National Historic Landmark, is listed on the National Register of Historic Places and is a Chicago Landmark.

=== George Swift Isham Home ===
This 1899 mansion at 1340 N State Parkway was built for a surgeon - Dr. George Swift Isham. Complete with 70-rooms, and a brick and limestone facade, the building became famous when it was acquired by Hugh Hefner in 1959. After the purchase, the mansion's basement was converted into a "grotto", with a swimming pool with a glass wall.

After Hefner left Chicago permanently for the West coast, the mansion was turned into a dormitory for the School of the Art Institute. In 1993, the mansion was sold, gutted and turned into four high-price luxury condos. In 2011, one 7,874 square-foot condo was put on the market for an asking price of $6.7 million.

=== Three Arts Club ===
The Three Arts Club of Chicago clubhouse was built in 1914 to provide a safe residence for young women studying the arts. This was part of a trend to construct buildings for artists at the turn of the century that was indicative of a growing appreciation for the arts in urban life and as a worthwhile educational pursuit. The buildings features 110 units arranged around a central courtyard with a Byzantine entrance with lush mosaics representing the three arts of music, drama, and painting.

The home is a Chicago Landmark.
