= Grinnell Historic Commercial District =

Historic district in Iowa, United States

- U.S. National Register of Historic Places
- U.S. Historic district
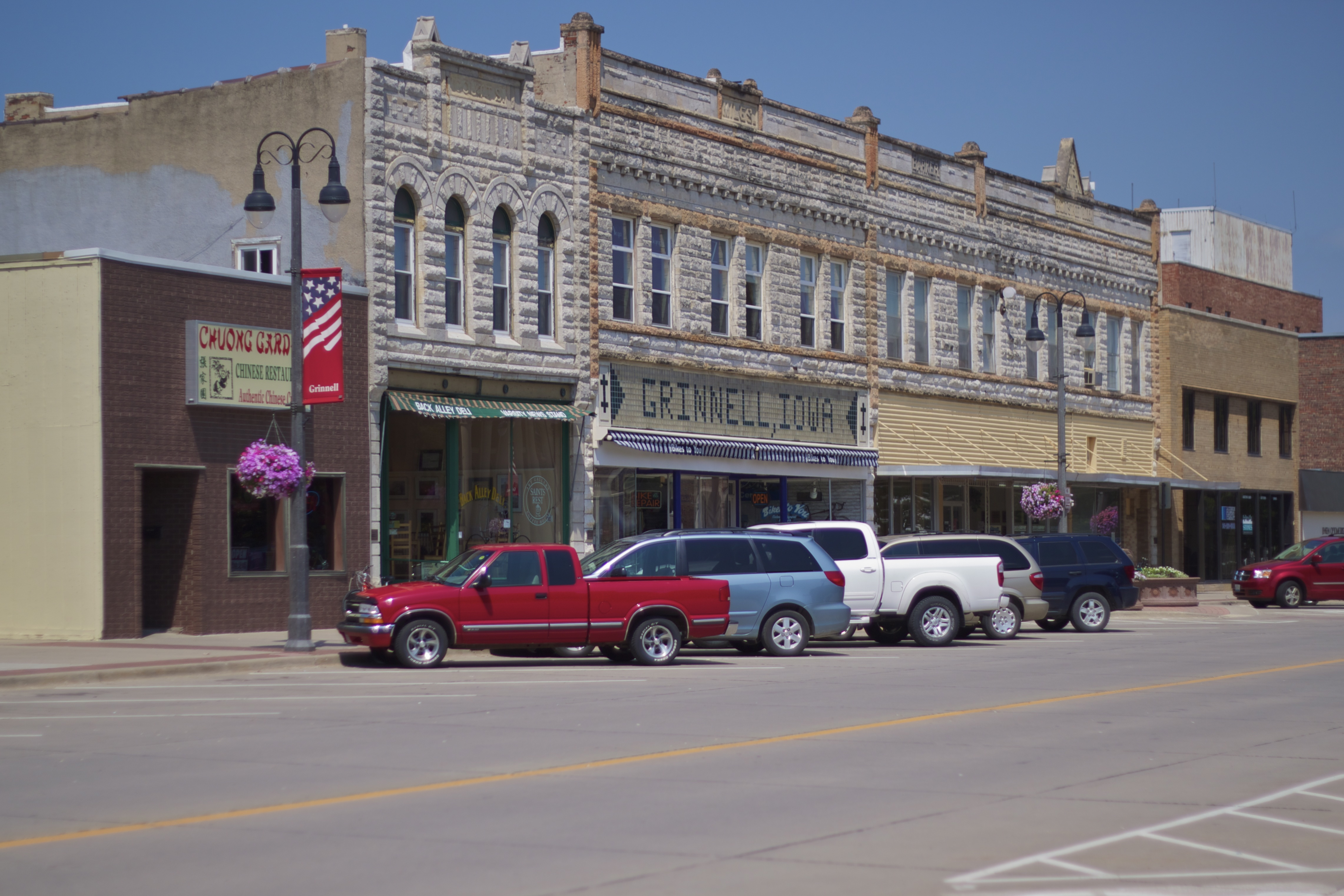

- Location within Iowa Location within the United States
- Location: Roughly bounded by Main, Broad, and Commercial Sts. and 5th Ave., Grinnell, Iowa
- Coordinates: 41°44′37″N 92°43′30″W
- Area: 5.26 acres (2.13 ha)
- Architectural style: Italianate; Gothic Revival; Romanesque Revival
- MPS: Grinnell MPS
- NRHP reference No.: 91000384
- Added to NRHP: April 9, 1991

The Grinnell Historic Commercial District is a nationally recognized historic district located in Grinnell, Iowa, United States. It was listed on the National Register of Historic Places in 1991. At the time of its nomination it contained 75 resources, which included 47 contributing buildings, and 26 non-contributing buildings. The historic district is the core of the city's central business district. Fires struck the area in 1889 (Block 8) and twice in 1891 (Block 7). They destroyed the frame buildings, and were replaced with brick and stone structures, although Block 7 developed more slowly. Most of the buildings are two stories in height, six buildings are single-story structures, and two are three stories. The economic development of the city was also assisted by the presence of Grinnell College and the presence of two railroads.

The district contains a number of buildings that were designed by prominent architects. They include Foster and Liebbe (Spencer Building, 1884; Seaman Building, 1889), Hallett & Rawson (Spaulding Block, 1899; Armory, 1906; Spaulding-Spurgeon Building, 1906), Josselyn and Todd (Cass and Works Building, 1889; Mclntosh Grocery, 1889; Morse Block, 1889; The Scott Building, 1889; Vest Brothers Building, 1889; Beyer Building, 1892), Proudfoot, Bird & Rawson (Benevolent and Protective Order of the Elks, 1914; Grinnell Herald, 1916), Louis Sullivan (Merchants' National Bank, 1914), and Hyland & Green (Grinnell State Bank, 1913/1914) and F.E. Wetherell (Hermon Masonic Temple, 1917).
