= Purdue State Bank =

Historic building in West Lafayette, Indiana

Coordinates: 40.4238°N 86.9077°W

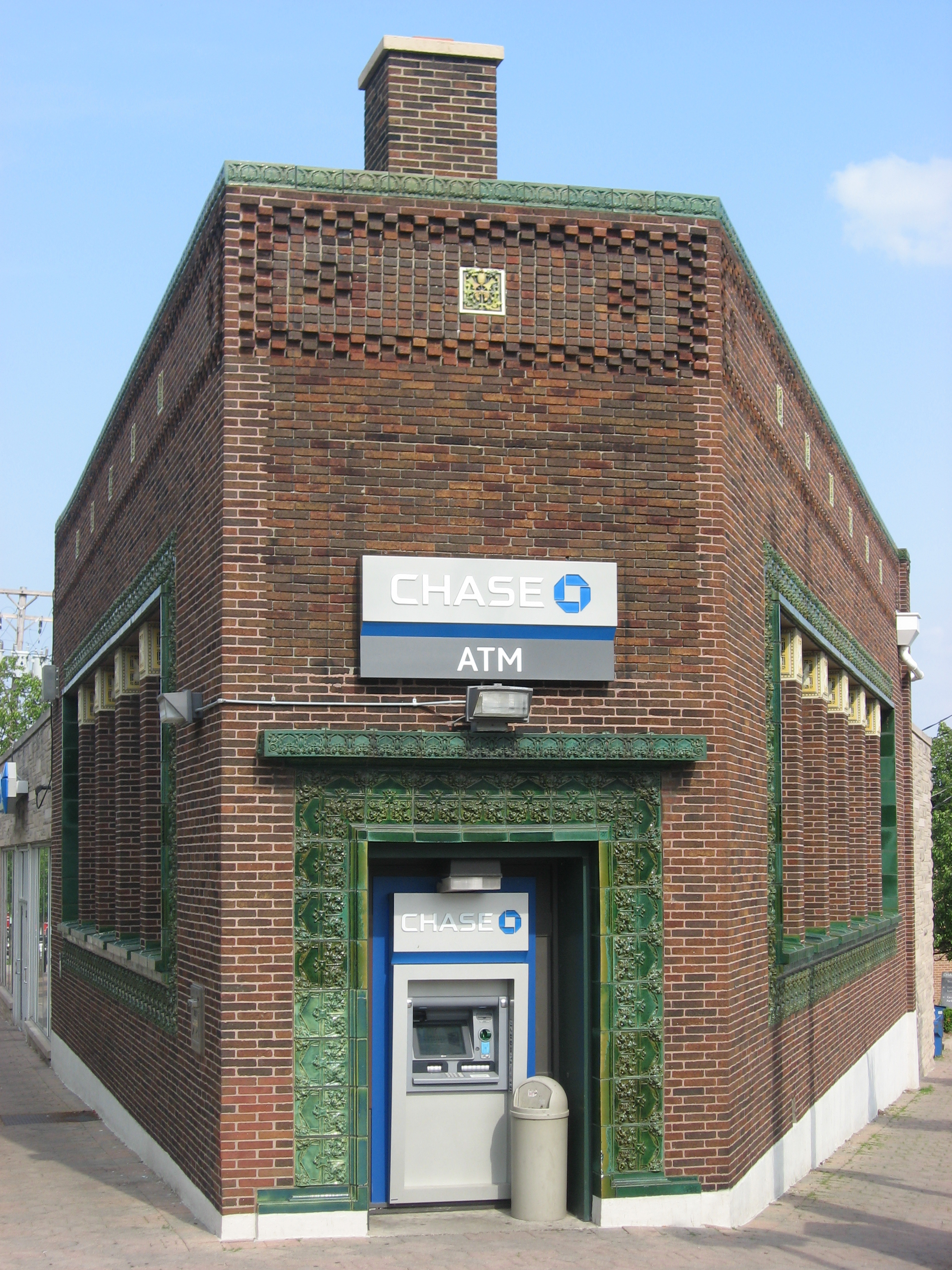
The original main doorway

The Purdue State Bank Building is a historic structure at 460 Northwestern Avenue in West Lafayette, Indiana, United States, designed by American architect Louis Sullivan. Completed in 1914, the bank is the smallest and least expensive of Sullivan's "Jewel Boxes", a series of Midwestern banks designed in the modern style at the end of his career. Built on a tiny, trapezoidal lot between two streets, the structure is less ornamental than most of the architect's other work, including only a few terra cotta panels. The building cost $14,600 to be constructed, of which only about 10% was paid to Sullivan, barely covering his expenses. A local paper at the time referred to Sullivan as "one of the most noted bank architects in the United States".

During the 1950s, a stone portion was added to the back of the building and the original doorway was converted into a window and then an ATM. The building is located one block from Purdue University and currently houses a branch of Chase bank.

== See also ==
Other Louis Sullivan "jewel boxes":

- Farmers and Merchants Bank, Columbus, Wisconsin (1919)
- Henry Adams Building, Algona, Iowa (1913)
- Home Building Association Company, Newark, Ohio (1914)
- Merchants' National Bank, Grinnell, Iowa (1914)
- National Farmer's Bank, Owatonna, Minnesota (1908)
- People's Federal Savings and Loan Association, Sidney, Ohio (1918)
- Peoples Savings Bank, Cedar Rapids, Iowa (1912)
