= People's Federal Savings and Loan Association =

Bank building in Sidney, Ohio

- U.S. National Register of Historic Places
- U.S. National Historic Landmark
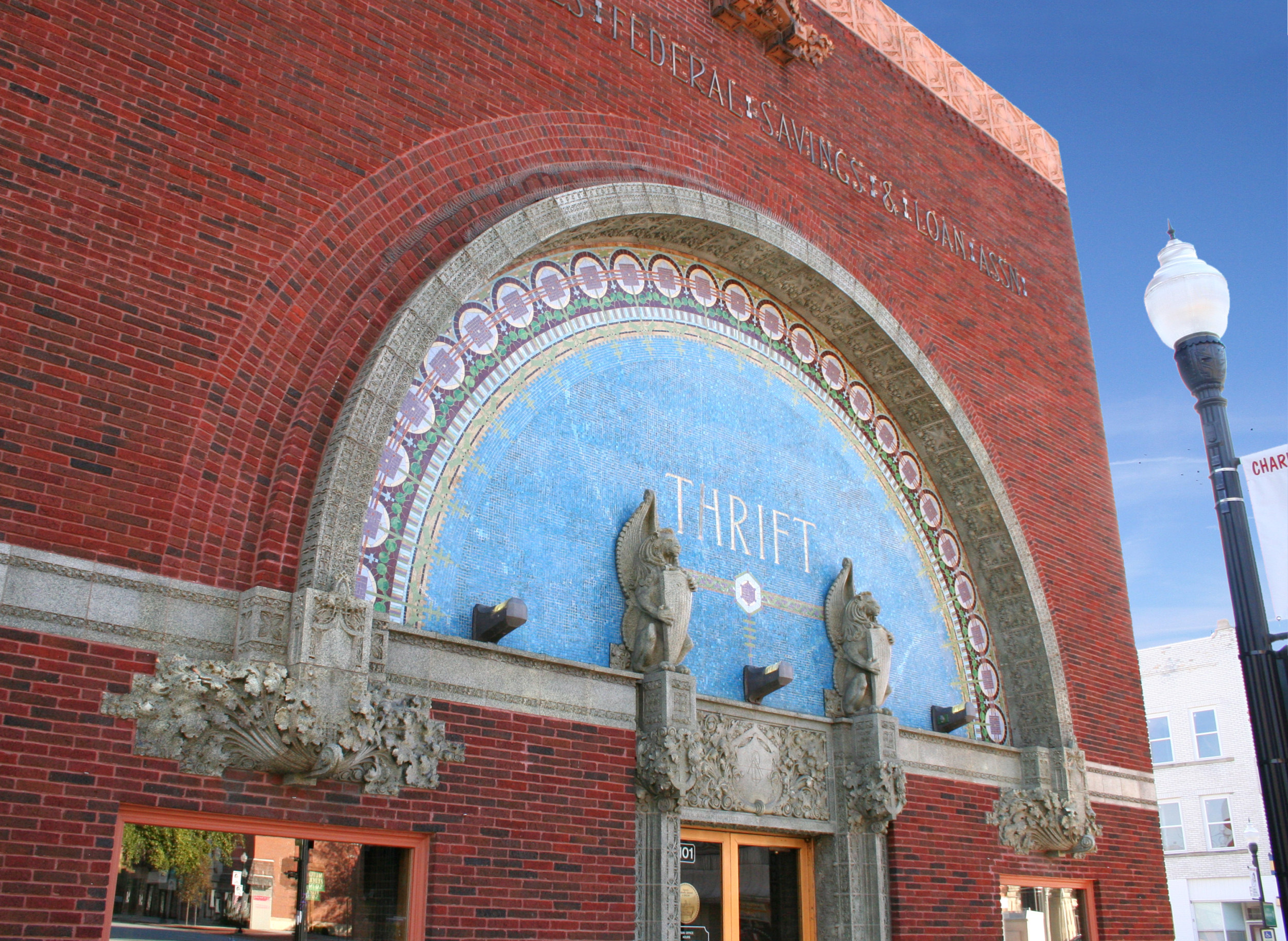
- Unusual architecture of the 1918 People's Federal Savings and Loan

- Location within Ohio Location within the United States
- Location: 101 E. Court St., Sidney, Ohio
- Coordinates: 40°17′2″N 84°9′24″W
- Area: less than one acre
- Built: 1917
- Architect: Louis Sullivan
- Architectural style: Late 19th and Early 20th Century American Movements
- NRHP reference No.: 72001042
- Added to NRHP: June 5, 1972

The People's Federal Savings and Loan Association is a historic bank building at 101 East Court Street in Sidney, Ohio, designed by Chicago architect Louis Sullivan. It was designed and built in 1917 for use by Peoples Federal Savings and Loan Association, which still operates out of it. It is one of several banks designed by Sullivan between 1908 and 1919 for small Midwestern U.S. communities. The building is listed on the National Register of Historic Places as a National Historic Landmark.

== Description and history ==
People's Federal Savings and Loan Association is located at 101 East Court Street on the corner of South Ohio Street in Sidney across from the Spot restaurant. It lies also across the street from the Gothic Revival Monumental Building and the Second Empire-style Shelby County Courthouse. Numerous colors adorn the building, beginning with the corbels of multicolored terracotta, which are placed over the front windows. A dominant Romanesque Revival archway forms the main entrance, set in a building base of black marble and amid walls of strong reds. Other parts of the walls are pierced by numerous windows featuring blue, green, and purple glasswork. The design is the result of Sullivan's architectural ideal: simple structurally but ornately decorated in their details.

The Sidney People's Federal Savings and Loan Association was one of a series of commissions that architect Louis Sullivan took on late in his career. These commissions resulted in a collection of bank buildings that have been termed "jewel boxes" for their modest size and ornate appearance. According to one account of the creation of Sullivan's design, he produced a sketch of it after two days of observing the empty lot where it was to stand. The sketch was at first rejected by the bank directors, who expressed a desire for a more conventional design with Classical features. Sullivan observed that they could have hired any of "a thousand architects to design a classic bank", but that only he could produce this type of design. The building was completed for $1,000 less than Sullivan's estimated cost.

== See also ==
- National Register of Historic Places listings in Shelby County, Ohio
- List of National Historic Landmarks in Ohio

Other Louis Sullivan "jewel boxes":

- Farmers and Merchants Bank, Columbus, Wisconsin (1919)
- Henry Adams Building, Algona, Iowa (1913)
- Home Building Association Company, Newark, Ohio (1915)
- Merchants' National Bank, Grinnell, Iowa (1914)
- National Farmer's Bank, Owatonna, Minnesota (1908)
- Peoples Savings Bank, Cedar Rapids, Iowa (1912)
- Purdue State Bank, West Lafayette, Indiana (1914)
