= National Farmers' Bank of Owatonna =

Historic bank in Minnesota, US

- National Farmers' Bank
- U.S. National Register of Historic Places
- U.S. National Historic Landmark
- U.S. Historic district – Contributing property
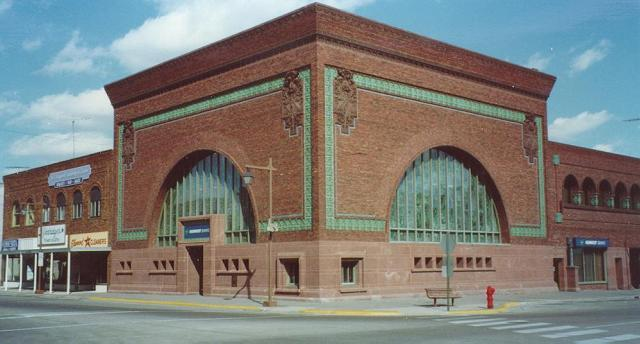
- The National Farmers' Bank of Owatonna from the southwest

- Location within Minnesota Location within the United States
- Location: 101 North Cedar Avenue, Owatonna, Minnesota
- Coordinates: 44°5′6″N 93°13′33″W
- Built: 1908
- Architect: Louis Sullivan
- Architectural style: Prairie School
- Part of: Owatonna Commercial Historic District (ID14001237)
- NRHP reference No.: 71000441

Significant dates
- Added to NRHP: August 26, 1971
- Designated NHL: January 7, 1976
- Designated CP: February 2, 2015

The National Farmers' Bank of Owatonna, Minnesota, United States, is a historic bank building designed by Louis Sullivan, with decorative elements by George Elmslie.

== History ==
It was built in 1908, and was the first of Sullivan's "jewel box" bank designs. The building is clad in red brick with green terra cotta bands, and features two large arches on its street-facing facades. Single-story wings, originally housing bank offices, extend along each side. Internal elements include two stained-glass windows designed by Louis J. Millet, a mural by Oskar Gross, and four immense cast iron electroliers designed by Elmslie and cast by Winslow Brothers Company.

The officers of the National Farmers' Bank sought Sullivan out, in part because they wanted a fresh idea of a bank building that would suit their specific needs, and they felt that conventional bank architecture of the time would not meet those. The building Sullivan designed included a farmers' exchange room, where its clients might do business with each other, a women's consultation room, a conference room for the bank board, and the president's office. All of these rooms were richly decorated, with custom furniture.

The bank was remodeled in 1940, and many of the interior architectural elements were destroyed. Subsequent work in 1958 and from 1976 to 1981 restored it to its original grandeur. On January 7, 1976, it was recognized as a National Historic Landmark for its architectural significance. The building now houses a branch of the Wells Fargo bank. It is also a contributing property to the Owatonna Commercial Historic District.

In 1981 the bank was featured on a block of four stamps paying tribute to American architects.

== Images ==
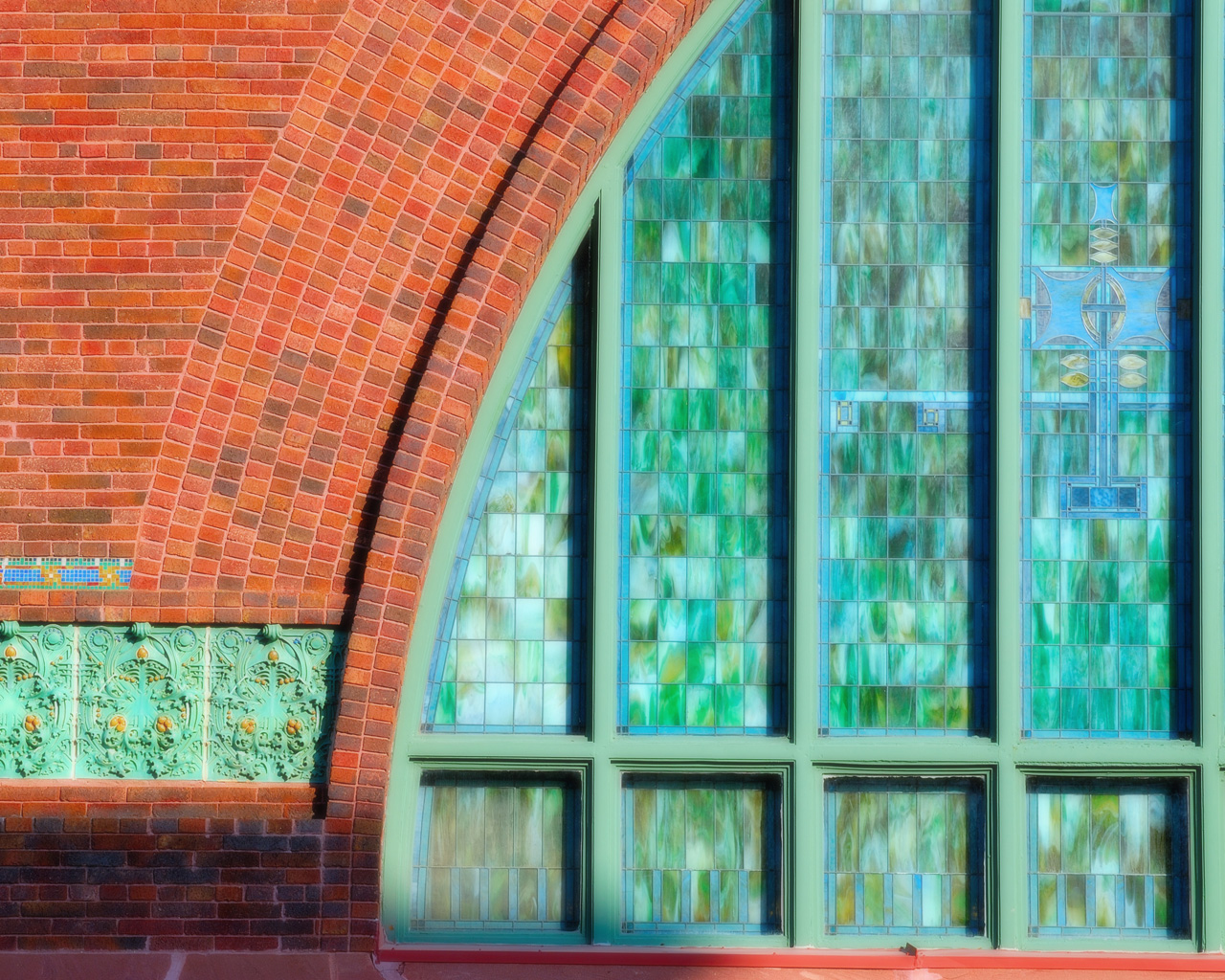
West elevation detail

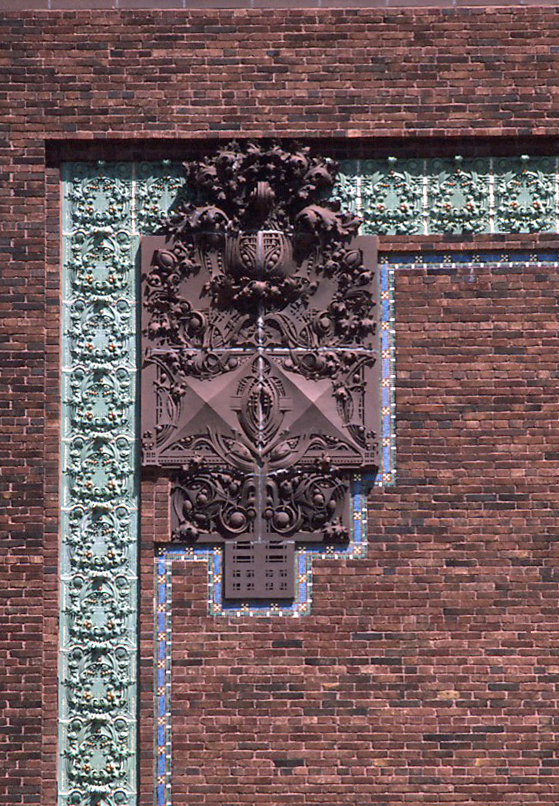
Cartouche

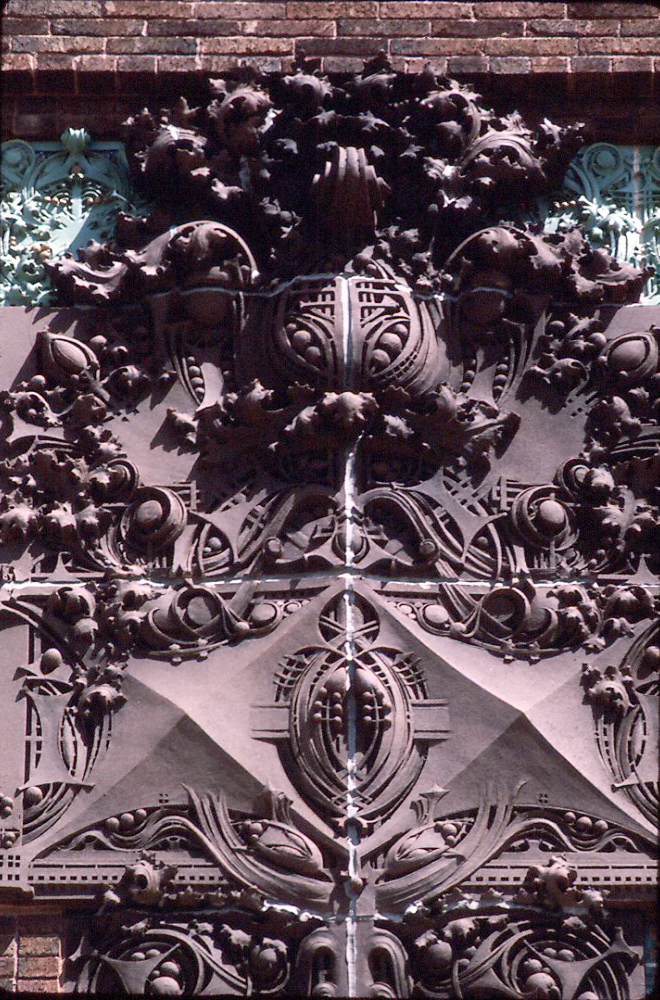
Cartouche detail

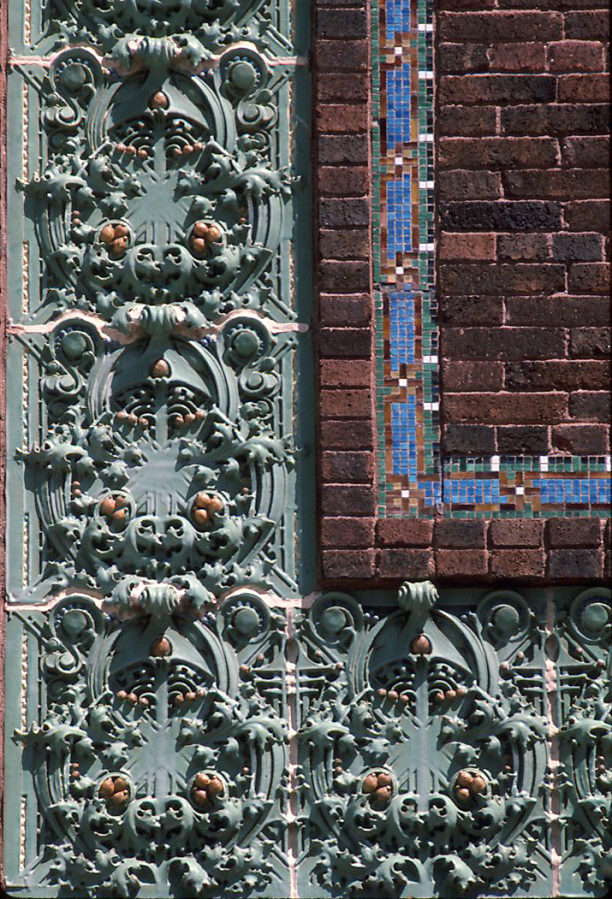
Exterior terra cotta

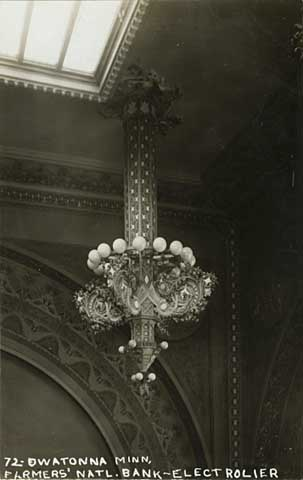
Electrolier

== See also ==
- List of National Historic Landmarks in Minnesota
- National Register of Historic Places listings in Steele County, Minnesota

Other Louis Sullivan "jewel boxes":

- Farmers and Merchants Bank, Columbus, Wisconsin (1919)
- Henry Adams Building, Algona, Iowa (1913)
- Home Building Association Company, Newark, Ohio (1914)
- Merchants' National Bank, Grinnell, Iowa (1914)
- People's Federal Savings and Loan Association, Sidney, Ohio (1918)
- Peoples Savings Bank, Cedar Rapids, Iowa (1912)
- Purdue State Bank, West Lafayette, Indiana (1914)
