= Merchants' National Bank =

Bank building in Grinnell, Iowa

- U.S. National Register of Historic Places
- U.S. National Historic Landmark
- U.S. Historic district – Contributing property
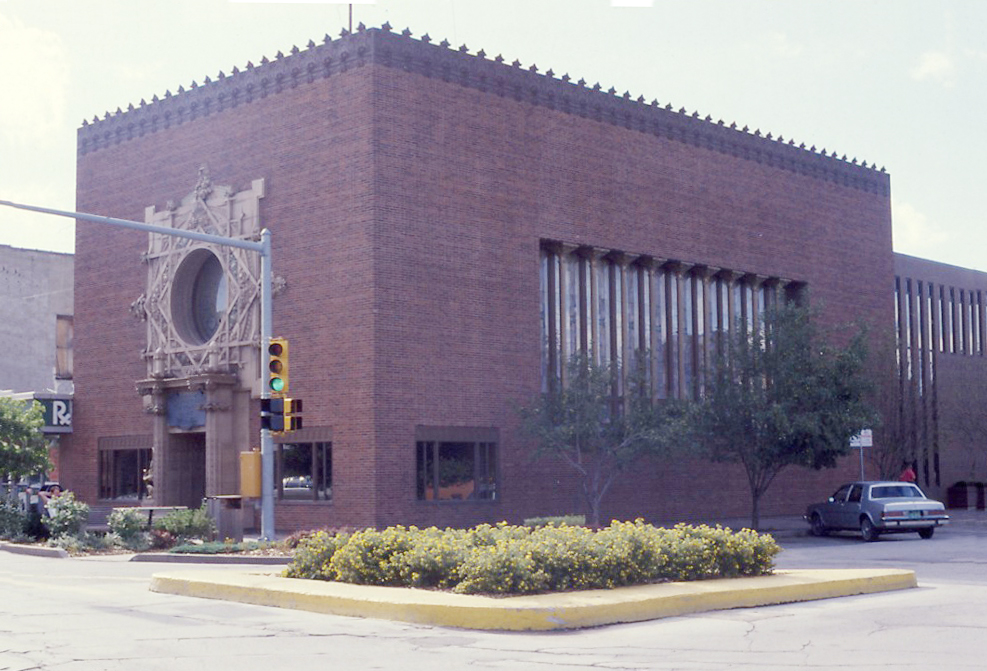
- Merchants' National Bank
- Location: 833 Fourth Avenue, Grinnell, Iowa
- Coordinates: 41°44′36″N 92°43′27.75″W
- Built: 1914
- Architect: Louis Sullivan; Stewart-Robison-Laffan
- Architectural style: Late 19th And Early 20th Century American Movements
- Part of: Grinnell Historic Commercial District (ID91000384)
- NRHP reference No.: 76000804

Significant dates
- Added to NRHP: January 7, 1976
- Designated NHL: January 7, 1976

The Merchants' National Bank is a historic commercial building located in Grinnell, Iowa. Built in 1914, it is one of a series of small banks designed by Louis Sullivan in the Midwest between 1909 and 1919. All of the banks are built of brick and for this structure he employed various shades of brick, ranging in color from blue-black to golden brown, giving it an overall reddish brown appearance. It was declared a National Historic Landmark in 1976 for its architecture. In 1991, it was listed as a contributing property to the Grinnell Historic Commercial District.

== Description and history ==
Merchants' National Bank was built in 1914 and had its grand opening on January the first, in 1915, along with the Purdue State Bank in Indiana, also designed by Sullivan.

Structurally the building is a rectangular box, with a magnificent main facade and a windowed side facade. Although this building is smaller than either his Owatonna or Cedar Rapids banks, it appears just as monumental. This is due largely to the oversized cartouche that surrounds a circular window on the Fourth Street facade. Light is introduced into the interior by a series of stained glass windows that alternate with structural posts down the side of the building and through the colored glass skylight that comprises much of the ceiling. As he did in his banks in Cedar Rapids and Sidney, Ohio, Sullivan used lions, or at least a grotesque, winged version of a lion, as figurative decoration. This creature is one of the very few figurative elements that can be found in the architect's designs. (The angels in his Transportation Building and the Bayard-Condict Building are other examples.) Some of the plans and even the designs of the ornament were done by Sullivan's draftsman Parker N. Berry.

While the bank housed in the structure and its location, the small town of Grinnell, did not warrant wide national attention, yet the unveiling of the Louis Sullivan building was given national coverage in the architectural press of the day. The Merchants' Bank was featured in an eleven-page spread in The Western Architect's February 1916 edition.

In the 1970s or early 1980s, a city beautification project sponsored the planting of several trees in front of the bank. Gebhard calls this an "unbelievable decision" for the growing plants would obscure more and more of the amazing facade. In 2007, the city remodeled its downtown sidewalks and streets so the intersections of the square had the "Jewelbox" appearance to them. The city also put Planters at the four corners of the crossings which have the "Jewelbox" engraved in them. Between 2008 and 2009, one of the lions in front of the building was damaged. Both lions have now been replaced.

== Images ==
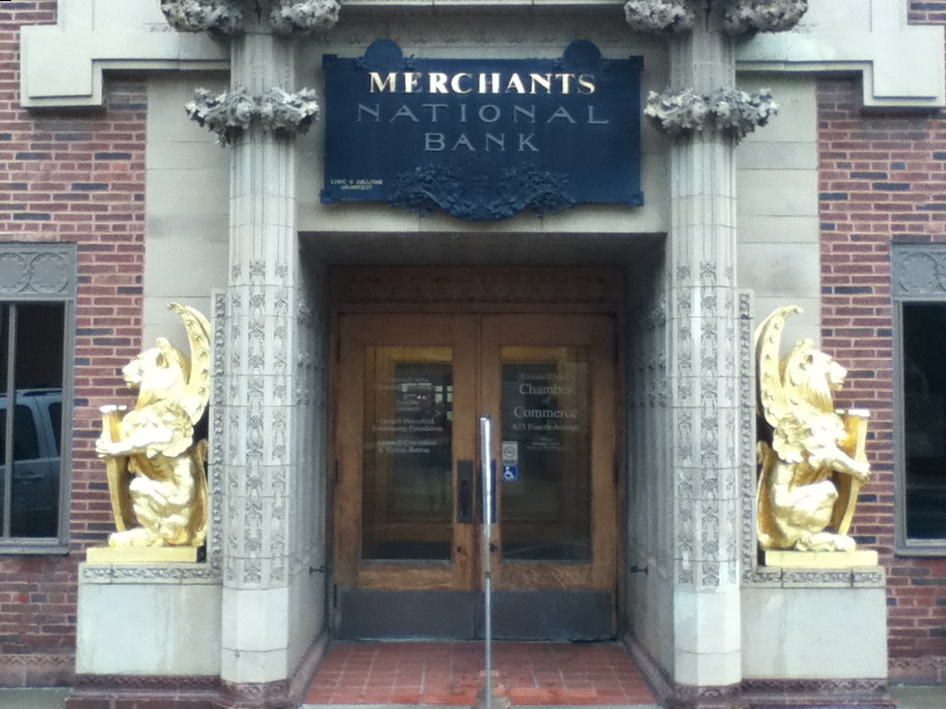
Merchants National Bank entrance with gold winged lions, Grinnell, IA

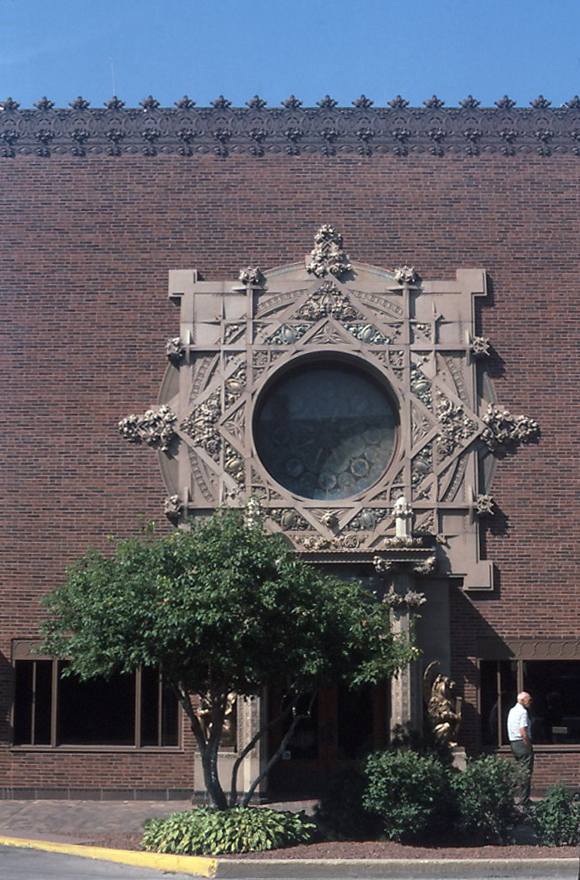
Main facade

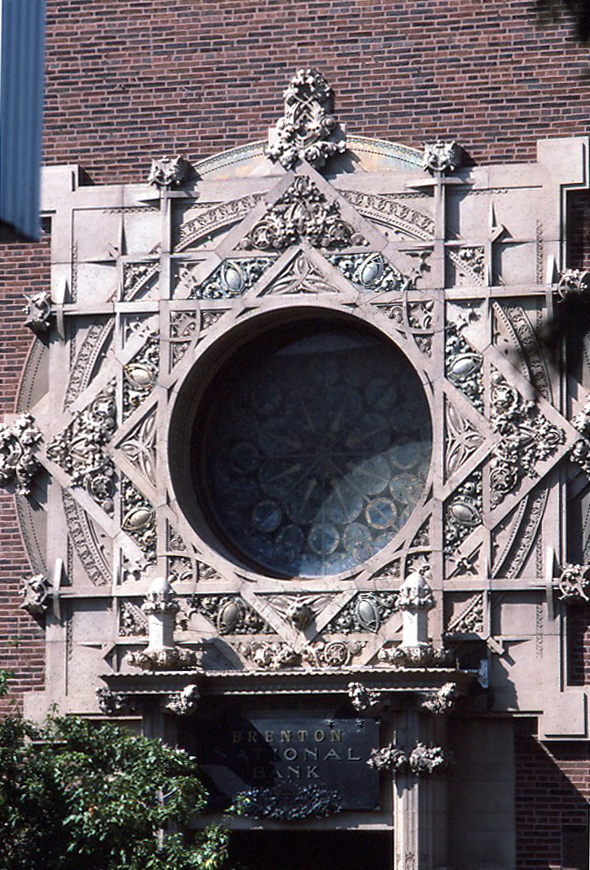
Cartouche

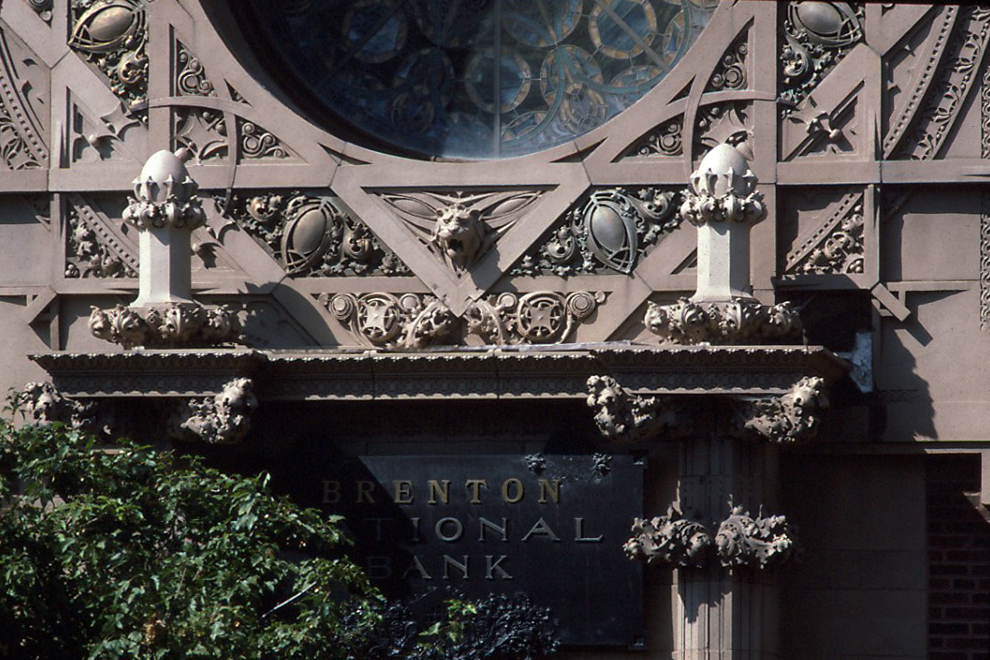
Over front entrance

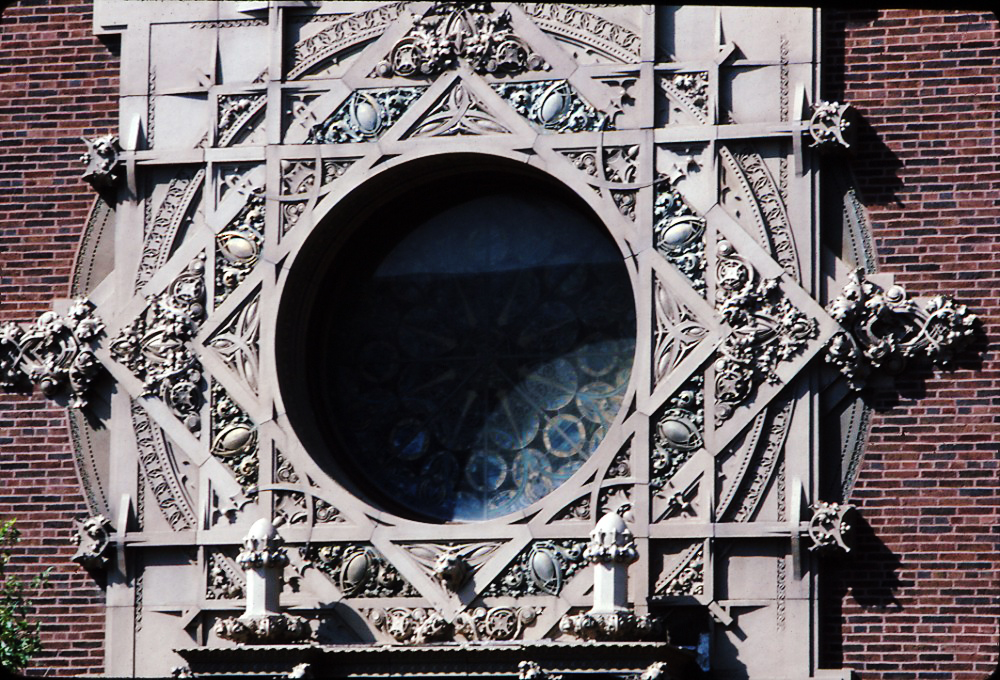

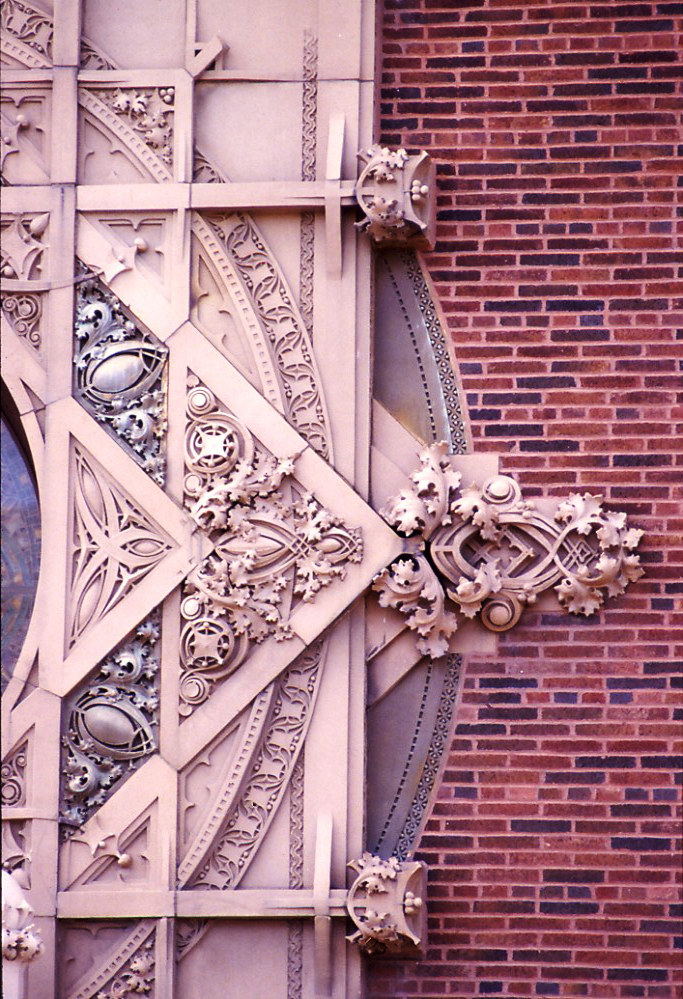
Detail of cartouche

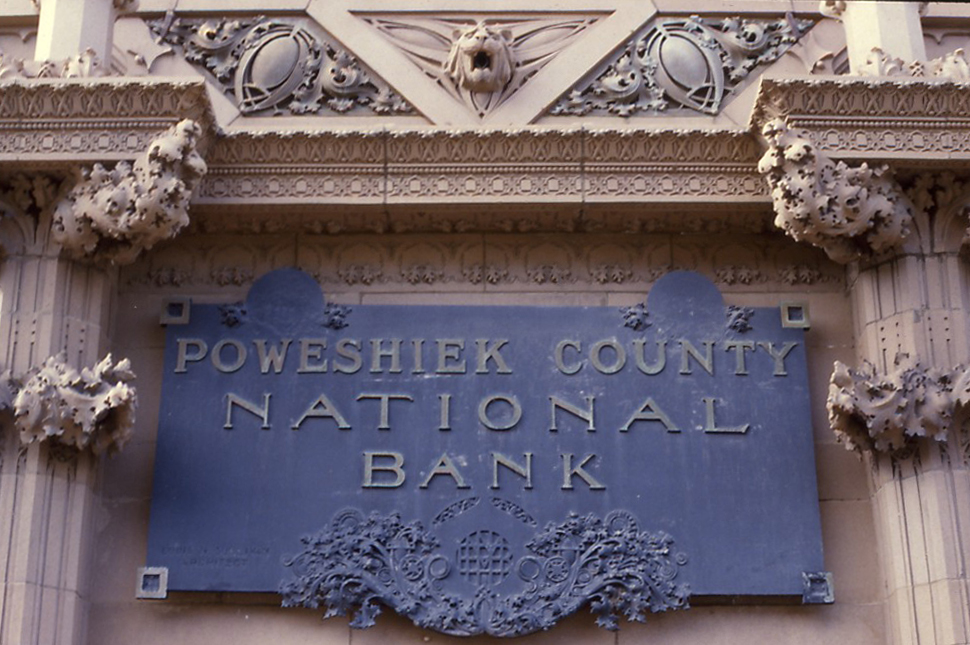
Sign over side door

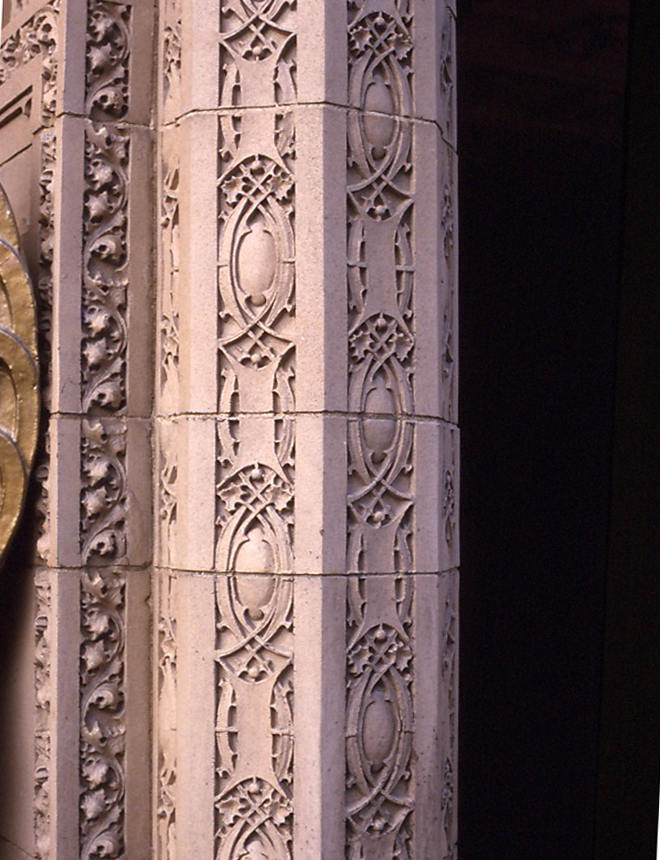
Door molding

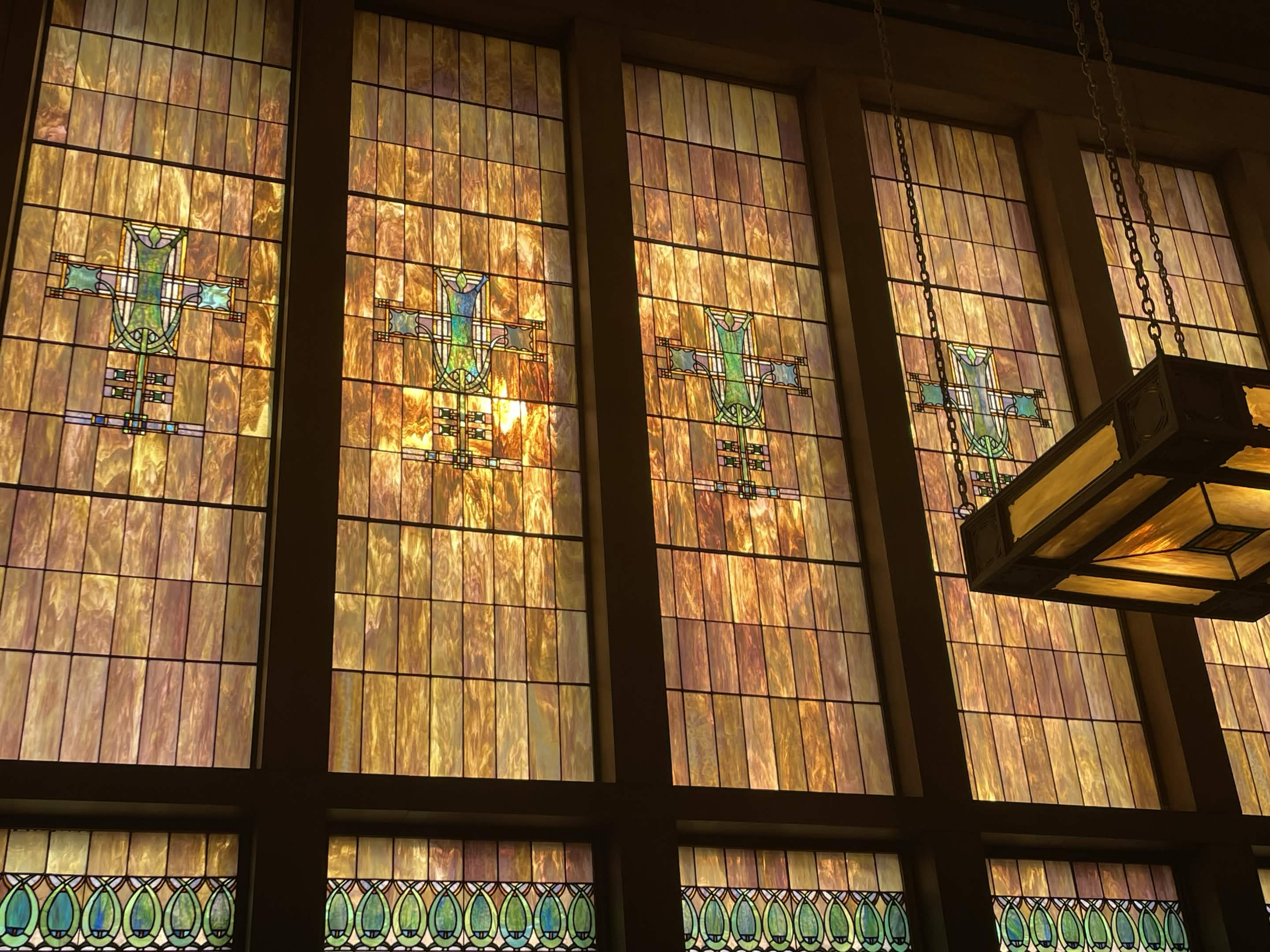
Main windows

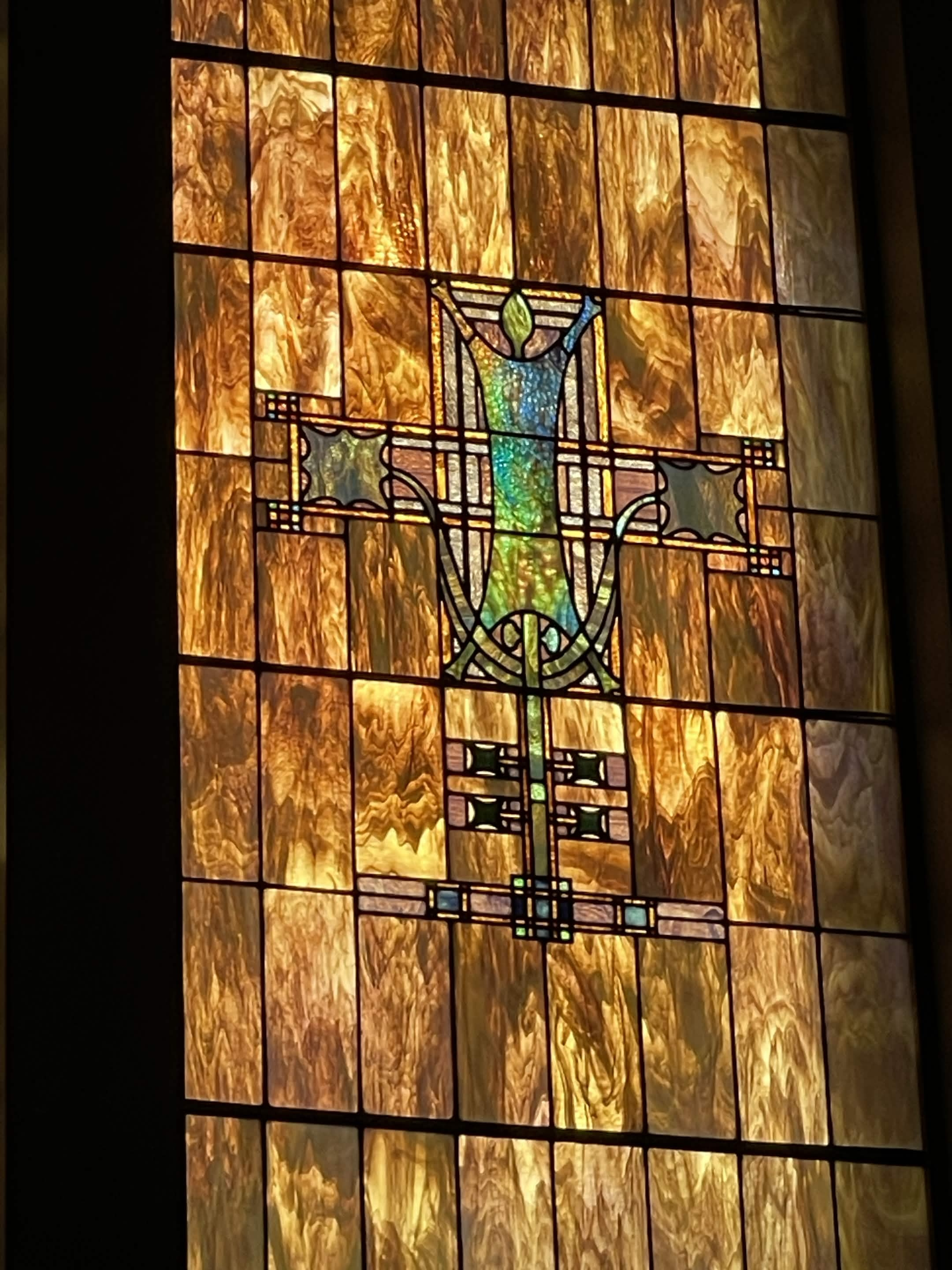
Main window detailing

== See also ==
- List of National Historic Landmarks in Iowa
- National Register of Historic Places listings in Poweshiek County, Iowa

Other Louis Sullivan "jewel boxes":

- Farmers and Merchants Bank, Columbus, Wisconsin (1919)
- Henry Adams Building, Algona, Iowa (1913)
- Home Building Association Company, Newark, Ohio (1914)
- National Farmer's Bank, Owatonna, Minnesota (1908)
- People's Federal Savings and Loan Association, Sidney, Ohio (1918)
- Peoples Savings Bank, Cedar Rapids, Iowa (1912)
- Purdue State Bank, West Lafayette, Indiana (1914)

== Sources ==
- Brooks, Harold Allen (1972). The prairie school; Frank Lloyd Wright and his midwest contemporaries. [Toronto, University of Toronto Press]. ISBN 978-0-8020-5251-3.
- Gebhard, David; Mansheim, Gerald (1993). Buildings of Iowa. Oxford University Press. ISBN 978-0-19-506148-2.
- Manieri-Elia, Mario; Sullivan, Louis H. (1996). Louis Henry Sullivan. Princeton Architectural Press. ISBN 978-1-56898-092-8.
- Menner, Bill (2007). Louis Sullivan's Merchants National Bank. Pomegranate. ISBN 978-0-7649-4040-8.
- Morrison, Hugh (2001). Louis Sullivan : prophet of modern architecture. New York : W.W. Norton & Company. ISBN 978-0-393-32161-6.
- Twombly, Robert C. (1986). Louis Sullivan : his life and work. New York, N.Y., U.S.A. : Viking. ISBN 978-0-670-80459-7.
- Wilson, Richard Guy (1977). The Prairie School in Iowa. Ames : Iowa State University Press. ISBN 978-0-8138-0915-1.
