= Farmers and Merchants Union Bank (Columbus, Wisconsin) =

Bank building in Columbus, Wisconsin

- U.S. National Register of Historic Places
- U.S. National Historic Landmark
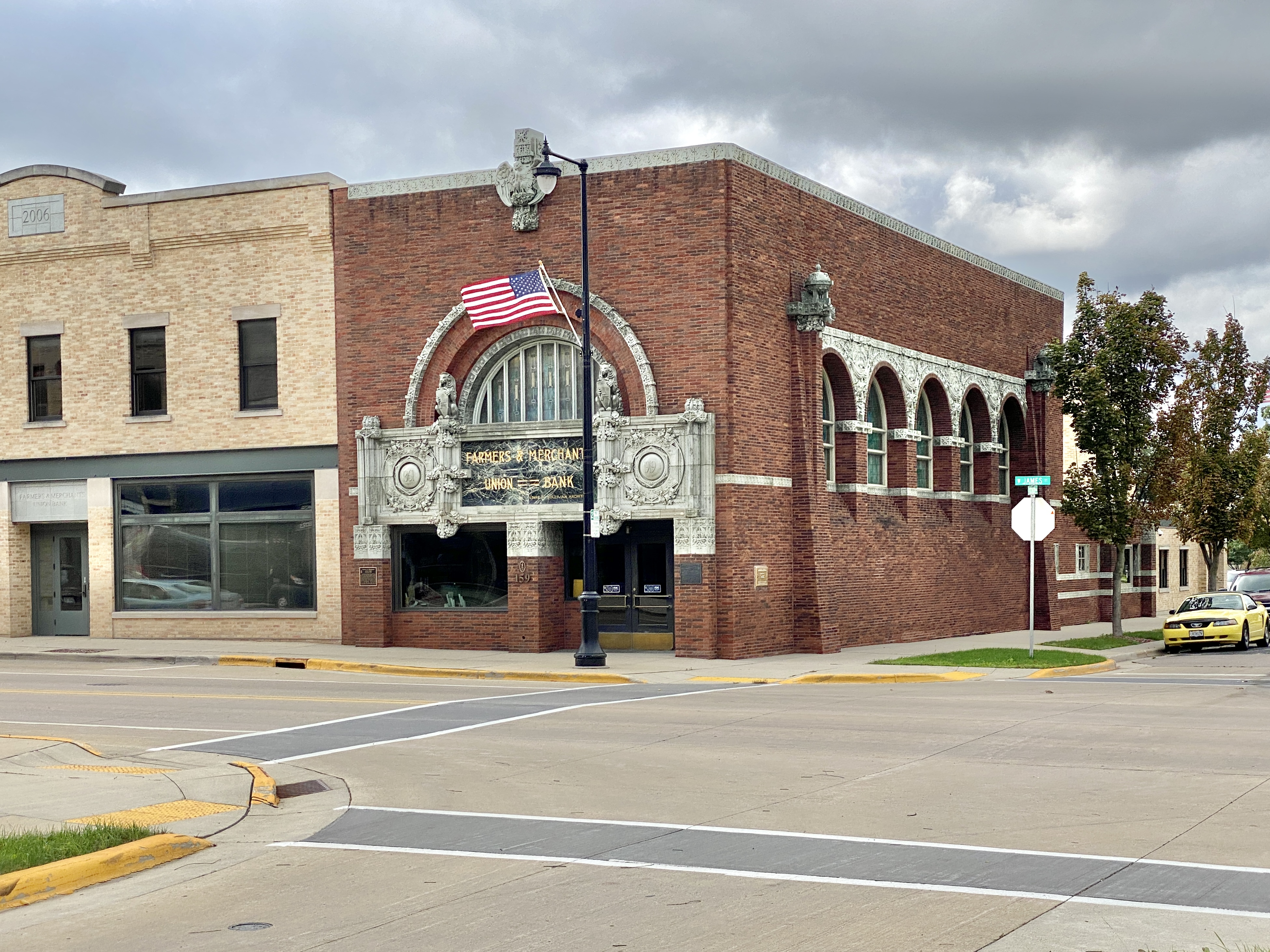
- Interactive map of Farmers and Merchants Union Bank
- Location: 159 W. James St., Columbus, Wisconsin
- Coordinates: 43°20′19.2″N 89°00′56.5″W
- Built: 1919
- Architect: Louis Sullivan
- Architectural style: Late 19th And Early 20th Century American Movements
- NRHP reference No.: 72000044

Significant dates
- Added to NRHP: October 18, 1972
- Designated NHL: January 7, 1976

The Farmers and Merchants Union Bank is a historic commercial building at 159 West James Street in Columbus, Wisconsin. Built in 1919, it is the last of eight "jewel box" bank buildings designed by Louis Sullivan, and the next to last to be constructed. It was declared a National Historic Landmark in 1976 for its architecture.

== Description and history ==
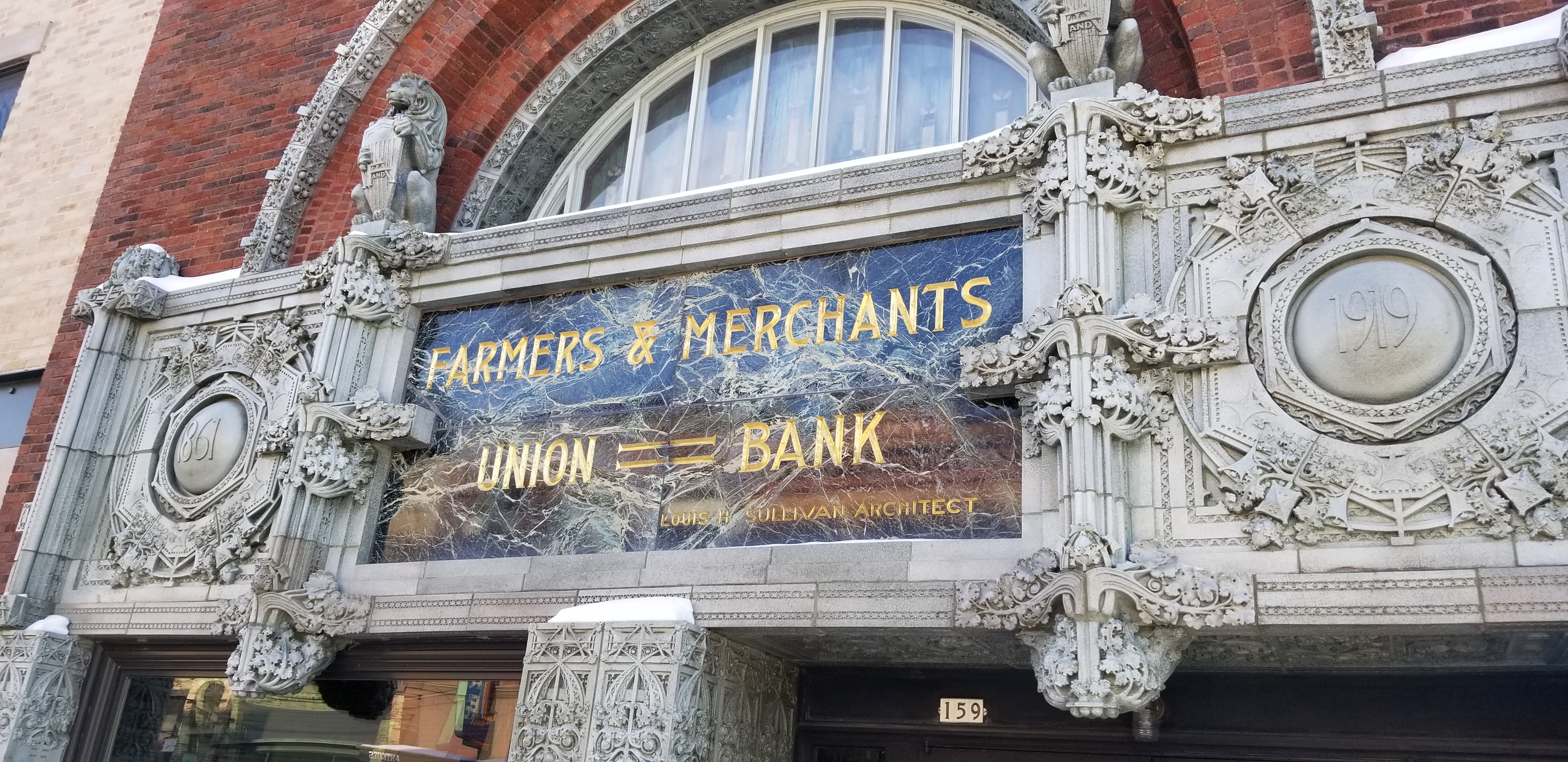
Panel on the main facade

The Farmers and Merchants Union Bank is located in downtown Columbus, at the southern corner of West James Street and South Dickason Boulevard. It is a tall single-story in height, its exterior finished in tapestry brick with marble and terra cotta trim. The main facade is two bays wide, with the building entrance in the right bay. Above these bays is an elaborately carved tall marble lintel, above which a half-round stained glass window is framed by a stone garland. The side of the building, facing South Dickason, has a band of five windows. The interior is small yet spacious, with a bank of teller stations on the left side.

The building was designed by Sullivan in 1919, and its construction was personally supervised by him. It was the last of his so-called "jewel box" designs of small bank buildings in smaller midwestern communities, and the second-to-last to be completed. It is one of two Sullivan designs in Wisconsin; the other, the Harold C. Bradley House, is also a National Historic Landmark. The design of this bank is fully documented in Sullivan's 1924 A System of Architectural Ornament, published not long before his death.

== See also ==
- List of National Historic Landmarks in Wisconsin
- National Register of Historic Places listings in Columbia County, Wisconsin

Other Louis Sullivan "jewel boxes":

- Henry Adams Building, Algona, Iowa (1913)
- Home Building Association Company, Newark, Ohio (1914)
- Merchants' National Bank, Grinnell, Iowa (1914)
- National Farmer's Bank, Owatonna, Minnesota (1908)
- People's Federal Savings and Loan Association, Sidney, Ohio (1918)
- Peoples Savings Bank, Cedar Rapids, Iowa (1912)
- Purdue State Bank, West Lafayette, Indiana (1914)
