= Alen (given name) =

Male given name

- Gender: Male
- Language: Old Gaelic, Celtic

Origin
- Origin: Europe
- Meaning: Little rock, handsome, harmony

Other names
- Variant forms: Allan, Allen, Alan, Alain, Alun

Alen is a male given name of European origin. In Old Gaelic, the name means "little rock." Other sources suggest it means "handsome" or "harmony."

In the Balkans, this particular spelling of the name is predominantly found among the peoples of the former Yugoslav nations, specifically among Bosniaks and Croats. This region also has a female equivalent: Alena.

== Given name ==
- Alen Abramović (born 1976), Croatian cross-country skier
- Alen Amedovski (born 1988), Macedonian mixed martial arts fighter
- Alen Avdić (born 1977), Bosnian football player
- Alen Avidzba (born 2000), Russian tennis player
- Alen Babić (born 1990), Bosnian footballer
- Alen Bajkusa (born 1971), Bosnia and Herzegovinian soccer player
- Alen Bašić (born 1980), Bosnian footballer
- Alen Bersin (born 1946), American lawyer
- Alen Bešić (born 1975), Serbian writer
- Alen Bokšić (born 1970), Croatian former football striker
- Alen Bošković (born 1971), Croatian water polo player
- Alen Deory (born 1996), Indian footballer
- Alén Diviš (1900–1956), Czech illustrator and painter
- Alen Fetić (born 1991), Slovenian futsal player
- Alen Grgić (born 1994), Croatian footballer
- Alen Győrfi (born 1989), Hungarian motorcycle racer
- Alen Hadzic (born 1991), American former fencer
- Alen Halilović (born 1996), Croatian football player
- Alen Hanson (born 1992), Dominican baseball player
- Alen Harbas (born 2004), Australian professional soccer player
- Alen Hodžić (born 1992), Slovene basketball player
- Alen Hodzovic (born 1977), German actor and singer
- Alen Horvat (born 1973), Croatian footballer and manager
- Alen Hujić (born 1967), Bosnian lawyer
- Alen Ilijic (born 1975), Serbian musical artist
- Alen Islamović (born 1957), Bosniak singer
- Alen Jogan (born 1985), Slovenian footballer
- Alen Jurilj (born 1996), Bosnian footballer
- Alen Khubulov (born 2001), Bulgarian freestyle wrestler
- Alen Kjosevski (born 2001), Macedonian handball player
- Alen Kozar (born 1995), Slovenian footballer
- Alen Kozić (born 1976), American soccer player
- Alen Krajnc (born 1995), Slovenian footballer
- Alen Krcić (born 1988), Slovenian footballer
- Alen Kurt (born 1974), Bosnian footballer
- Alen Liverić (born 1967), Croatian film and television actor
- Alen Lončar (born 1974), Croatian freestyle swimmer
- Alen MacWeeney (born 1939), American photographer
- Alen Maras (born 1982), Croatian footballer
- Alen Marcina (born 1979), Canadian soccer player
- Alen Margaryan (1999–2020), Armenian soldier
- Alen Mašović (born 1994), Serbian footballer
- Alen Melunović (born 1990), Serbian former footballer
- Alen Mešanović (born 1975), Bosnian international footballer
- Alen Milosevic (born 1989), Swiss handball player
- Alen Mirzoian (born 1996), Russian freestyle wrestler
- Alen Mrzlecki (born 1974), Croatian footballer
- Alen Mujanovič (born 1976), Slovenian footballer
- Alen Muratović (born 1979), Montenegrin handball player
- Alen Mustafić (born 1999), Bosnian footballer
- Alen Omić (born 1992), Bosnian-born Slovenian basketball player
- Alen Orman (born 1978), Bosnian-Austrian footballer
- Alen Oroz (born 1984), Austrian footballer
- Alen Ovčina (born 1989), Bosnia handball player
- Alen Ožbolt (born 1996), Slovenian footballer
- Alen Pajenk (born 1986), Slovenian volleyball player
- Alen Pamić (1989–2013), Croatian footballer
- Alen Panov, Ukrainian diplomat
- Alen Peternac (born 1972), Croatian football striker
- Alen Petrović (born 1969), Croatian footballer
- Alen Ploj (born 1992), Slovenian football forward
- Alen Pol Kobryn (1949–2023), American poet and novelist
- Alen Roj (born 1992), Slovenian badminton player
- Alen Šeranić (born 1977), Bosnian politician
- Alen Sherri (born 1997), Albanian footballer
- Alen Simonyan (born 1980), Armenian politician
- Alen Šket (born 1988), Slovenian volleyball player
- Alen Škoro (born 1981), Bosnian footballer
- Alen Skribek (born 2001), Hungarian footballer
- Alen Smailagić (born 2000), Serbian basketball player
- Alen Stajcic (born 1973), Australian former football player
- Alen Stanešić (born 1983), Croatian footballer
- Alen Stevanović (born 1991) Serbian footballer
- Alen Vitasović (born 1968), Croatian pop singer and songwriter
- Alen Vučkić (born 1990), Slovenian footballer
- Alen Zaseyev (born 1988), Ukrainian freestyle wrestler

== See also ==
- Alen (disambiguation)
- Alén (name), a given name and surname
- Alen Baronets
- Van Alen (disambiguation)
- Alan (given name)
- Allan (given name)
- Allen (given name)
