= Van Allen =

Van Allen may refer to:

== People ==
=== Given name ===
- Van Allen Plexico (born 1968), U.S. professor

=== Surname ===
- George Van Allen (1890–1937), politician in Alberta, Canada
- James Van Allen (1914–2006), American space scientist
- John Delbert Van Allen (1850–1928), retail dry goods merchant and department store owner
- Mark van Allen (born 1954), American musician
- Shaun Van Allen (born 1967), former hockey player

== Places ==
- Van Allen Range, a mountain range in Oates Land, Antarctica
- Van Allen Building, Clinton, Iowa, US
- Van Allen Hall, University of Iowa
- Van Allen House, Oakland, Bergen, New Jersey, US

== Other uses ==
- Van Allen radiation belt, a torus of energetic charged particles around Earth
- Van Allen Probes, two robotic NASA spacecraft

== See also ==
- Van Allen Belt (band), a Canadian rock band
- Allen (disambiguation)
- Van Alen (disambiguation)
- Van Asten
- Van Halen (disambiguation)
