= Alan (given name) =

Male given name

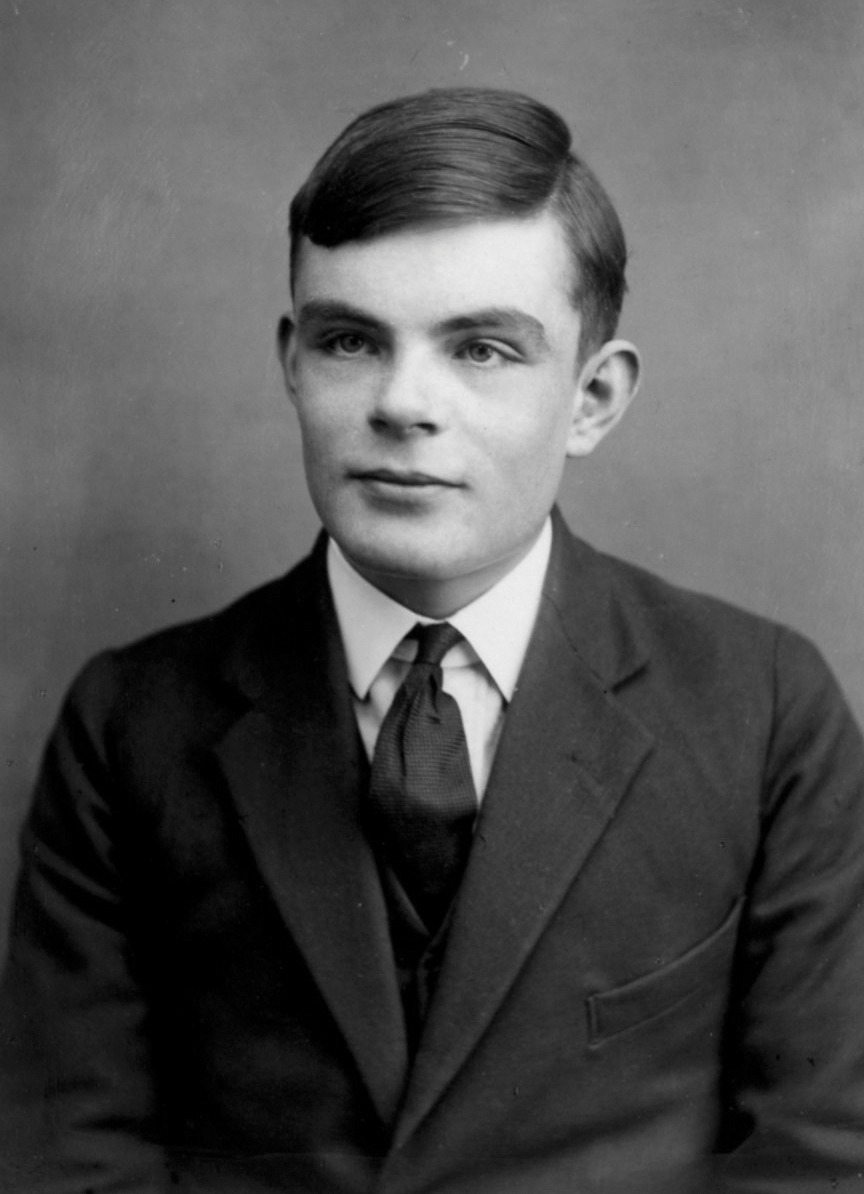
- Alan Turing
- Pronunciation: /ˈælən/
- Gender: Male
- Language: English, Old Breton, Celtic, Norman French

Other names
- Variant forms: Allan, Allen, Allyn, Alen, Alin, Alyn, Aryan
- Short forms: Al, Allie, Ally, Ali
- See also: Alén, Alun, Alexander

Alan is a masculine given name in the English and Breton languages. Its surname form is Aland.

There is no clear consensus on the etymology of the given name Alan. The name is particularly associated with Breton and other Celtic naming traditions, and was brought to England following the Norman Conquest. It was used in Brittany from at least the 6th century. One proposed Brythonic etymology derives Alan from a Celtic word meaning "deer", with other proposed meanings including "handsome" or "cheerful", and "little rock". Another theory connects the name with the Alans, a Sarmatian people who migrated to Western Europe during the Migration Period. Another theory suggests it may be a form of the given name Aryan.

== Etymology and early history ==
Alan is a masculine given name in the English language.

The modern English Alan, and French Alain, are derived from the name of the Alans. Described by Roman authors as tall, blond, and warlike, the Alans were a nomadic Iranian people who lived on the Eurasian Steppe and the Caucasus Mountains.

Related to the Scythians, the Alans were known to Classical authors in the 1st century BC.

The Alans settled in Western Europe in the Early Middle Ages. Because there is no recorded use of the ethnonym Alani prior to the 1st century, and because no location with a placename derived from Alani can be shown to be older than the 5th century, it is likely that the name was derived from the Iranian Alan people. No other explanation of the origin of the name Alan has received any measure of acceptance by scholars.

However, the Breton name Alan can not be a direct loan from the ethnic name of the Alans (rendered as Alānī or Halānī in Latin, from Scytho-Sarmatian *Al[l]ān-, derived from Old Iranian *aryāna, "noble, honorable people") because the long vowel in the second syllable would produce Old Breton -o-, Middle Breton -eu- and Modern Breton -e- and not the attested spelling with an -a-.

In Breton, alan is a colloquial term for a fox and may originally have meant "deer", making it cognate with Old Welsh alan (cf. Canu Aneirin, B2.28, line 1125: "gnaut i-lluru alan buan bithei", "it was usual for him to be fleet like a deer"), Modern Welsh elain (plural alanedd) "young deer" (and the plant name alan "coltsfoot, elecampane"), coming from a Brittonic root *alan- or *elan (also attested in Gaulish personal names such as Elenos, Elenius, derived form Elantia and in Celtiberian in personal names such as Elanus, Elaesus, and Ela), ultimately derived from Proto-Indo-European *(H_{1})el-Hn- "deer, hind" (perhaps denoting an animal - generally cervids - with red or brown fur).

In Ireland and Gaelic-speaking Scotland, Alan may also be an Anglicisation of an Irish word (with diminutive suffix) meaning "rock". For example, the modern Irish ailín means "little rock" or "pebble". Similarly, according to Patrick Woulfe, the Irish name Ailín is derived from diminutive ail, which means "noble", "rock". Woulfe stated that this name is a pet form of some other name beginning with the first element Ail-. Forms of the Gaelic name appear in early British records; the Latin form Ailenus was recorded by Adomnán (died 704). (Note: The name appears within Adomnán's Vita Columbae as part of a patronym: "Colman Canis, filius Aileni". This name is rendered into Old Irish as Colmán Cú mac Ailéni. Colmán belonged to the royal dynasty of Mugdorna; his brother, Mael Dúin, king of Mugdorna, died in 611.) Another similar-looking word in Irish is álainn and Scottish Gaelic àlainn, which means "beautiful".

The name Alan possibly is derived from the Greek name Alexander, through a process of progressive phonetic reduction that occurred over several centuries in the Romance-speaking world. The most widely accepted etymological trajectory is the following apocopic (shortening) sequence: Alexander → Aleander → Alander → Alan.

== Variations of the name ==
There are numerous variations of the name in English. The variants Allan and Allen are generally considered to be derived from the surnames Allan and Allen. The form Allan is used mainly in Scotland and North America. In England, the given names Allan and Allen are less popular than Alan. However, in America all three are generally about the same in popularity.

Alun is an old masculine given name in the Welsh language; although it is not directly related to Alan (it is derived from Proto-Celtic *alouno- meaning either "nourishing" or "wandering"), today it is generally used as a variant form of the English name. An earlier bearer of this name is Alun of Dyfed, a character in the Mabinogion. The name became popular in modern times when it was adopted as a bardic name by John Blackwell, a 19th-century Welsh poet.

== Short forms ==
The short form of Alan is Al. /æl/

This name is a short form of numerous other etymologically unrelated names that begin with this syllable. Note also the Cornish hypocoristic form Talan.

== Feminine forms ==
There are numerous feminine forms of Alan. The form Alana is a feminisation of the name. Variants of Alana include: Alanah, Alanna, Alannah, Allana, and Ilana. Another feminine form is Alaina, derived from the French Alain; a variant of this feminine name is Alayna. A variant form of Alaina is Alaine, although it can also be a variant form of the etymologically unrelated Elaine.

== In other languages ==
- Armenian: Ալեն (Alen), masculine. Ալինա (Alina), feminine.
- Croatian: Alan, Alen, masculine. Alina, feminine.
- Czech: Alan, masculine. Alena, feminine.
- Danish: Allan, masculine.
- English: Alaina, Alaine, Alayna, Alana, Alanah, Alanna, Alannah, Allana, feminine.
- Estonian: Allan, masculine.
- Faroese: Allan, masculine.
- French: Alain, masculine.
- Indonesian: Alan, masculine.
- Indonesian: Alan, Allan, Allendra, Allen, Alen, Allandra, masculine
- Irish: Ailín, masculine.
- Kurdish: Alan, masculine.
- Latin: Alanus, masculine.
- Latin: Ailenus, masculine, the Latin form of Ailín.
- Macedonian: Alen, Alain, Alon, Allon,masculine.
- Old Breton: Alan, masculine.
- Old French: Alain/Alein, masculine.
- Ossetian: Alan, masculine.
- Norman French: Alan, masculine.
- Romanian: Alin, masculine. Alina, feminine.
- Scottish Gaelic: Ailean, masculine.
- Spanish: Alano, Alán, masculine.
- Turkish: Alan, means gainer, masculine
- Welsh: Alun, masculine.

== Popularity and use ==
The name was brought to England by Bretons who took part in the Norman Invasion in the mid-11th century. Forms of the name were in use much earlier in what is today Brittany, France. An early figure who bore the name was St Alan, a 5th-century bishop of Quimper. This saint became a cult figure in the Brittany during the Middle Ages. Another early bearer of the name was St Alan, a 6th-century Cornish saint, who has a church dedicated to his memory in Cornwall (for example see St Allen, a civil parish in Cornwall named after this saint).

Today the use of the given name (and its variants) is due to its popularity among the Bretons who imported the name to England, to Cornwall, and later to Ireland. The Bretons formed a significant part of William, Duke of Normandy's army at the Battle of Hastings in 1066. Later many Bretons were granted lands throughout William's freshly conquered kingdom. The most notable Breton Alan, Earl of Richmond, a cadet of the ducal house of Brittany, who was awarded with a large swath of lands in England - specifically lands in what is today Lincolnshire and East Anglia. The Breton character in many English counties can be traced through Breton personal names still in use in the 12th centuries. The name ranked 8th in popularity in Lincolnshire in the 12th century, where it was about even with Simon and more numerous than Henry. Early occurrences of the name in British records include: Alanus in 1066 (in the Domesday Book); and Alain in 1183. The name became popular in Scotland in part through the Stewarts. This family descends from Alan fitz Flaad, an Anglo-Breton knight, who possessed lands in what is modern day Shropshire, England.
