= Alun (given name) =

Alun (pronounced [ˈalɨ̞n]) is a Welsh variant of the masculine given name Alan. Notable people with the name include:

- Alun Anderson (born 1948), British writer
- Alun Armstrong (born 1946), English actor
- Alun Armstrong (footballer) (born 1975), English footballer and manager
- Alun Bollinger (born 1948), New Zealand cinematographer
- Alun Cairns (born 1970), British Conservative politician
- Alun Carter (1964–2024), Wales international rugby union player
- Alun Gwynne Jones, Baron Chalfont (1919–2020), British politician
- Alun Cochrane (born 1975), British comedian
- Alun Cox, Welsh politician
- Alun Davies (politician) (born 1964), Welsh politician
- Alun Davies (guitarist) (born 1943), Welsh musician
- Alun Davies (biologist) (born 1955), Welsh biologist
- Alun Davies (priest) (1923–2003), Welsh Anglican priest
- Alun Davies (historian) (1916–1980), Welsh historian
- Alun Davies (sailor) (born 1963), Caymanian sailor
- Alun Davies (rugby union) (born 1956), Welsh rugby player
- Alun Herbert Davies (1927–2005), Welsh Books Council director
- Alun Huw Davies (born 1960), Welsh vascular diseases researcher
- Alun Talfan Davies (1913–2000), Welsh judge and politician
- Alun Wyn Davies, Welsh rugby union player
- Alun Donovan (born 1955), Welsh rugby player
- Alun Evans (born 1949), English footballer
- Alun Evans (FAW) (1942–2011), Welsh football chairman
- Alun Evans (cricketer) (born 1975), Welsh cricketer
- Alun Evans (New Zealand footballer) (born 1965), New Zealand footballer
- Alun Evans (priest) (born 1947), Welsh Anglican priest
- Alun Francis (born 1943), Welsh conductor
- Alun Gibbard (1960–2025), Welsh author and broadcaster
- Alun Hawkins (born 1944), British Anglican priest
- Alun Hoddinott (1929–2008), Welsh composer
- Alun Howkins (1947–2018), English social historian
- Alun Jones (tennis) (born 1980), Australian tennis player
- Alun Ffred Jones (born 1949), Welsh politician
- Alun Wyn Jones (born 1985), Welsh rugby union player
- Alun Kyte (born 1964), English criminal
- Alun Tan Lan, Welsh singer-songwriter
- Alun Lawrence (born 1998), Welsh rugby union footballer
- Alun Leach-Jones (1937–2017), British- Australian artist
- Alun Lewis (poet) (1915–1944), Welsh poet
- Alun Lewis (actor) (born 1949), British actor
- Alun Lewis (rugby union) (born 1956), British Lions international rugby union player
- Alun Lewis (swimmer), Welsh swimmer
- Alun Llywelyn-Williams (1913–1988), Welsh writer and literary critic
- Alun Meredith (1919–2003), Wales international rugby union player
- Alun Michael (born 1943), Welsh politician
- Alun Morgan (1928–2018), British jazz critic and writer
- Alun Munslow (1947–2019), British historian
- Alun Oldfield-Davies (1905–1988), Welsh broadcaster and public servant
- Alun Owen (1925–1994), Welsh playwright, screenwriter and actor
- Gareth Alun Owens (born 1964), British-Greek academic
- Alun Parry, English musician
- Alun Pask (1937–1995), British Lions & Wales international rugby union footballer
- Alun Priday (born 1933), Welsh rugby player
- Alun Pugh (born 1955), Welsh Labour politician
- Alun Richards (1929–2004), Welsh novelist
- Alun Rossiter (born 1965), British motorcycle speedway rider
- Alun Thomas (1926–1991), British Lions & Wales international rugby union footballer
- Alun Thomas (bowls) (born 1945), Welsh international lawn bowler
- Alun Walker (born 1990), Scottish rugby union player
- Alun Williams (1920–1992), Welsh radio presenter
- Alun Ogwen Williams (1904–1970), Welsh teacher
- Alun Woodward (born 1971), Scottish singer-songwriter

== See also ==
- Alun (disambiguation)
- An unrelated name is Alan Gua (Mongolian: Alun Gua), a mythical figure in The Secret History of the Mongols
