= Alen =

Alen may refer to:

== People ==
- Alen (given name), a Bosniak, Serbian and Croatian given name
- Alén (name), surname and given name
- Alen baronets of Ireland

== Places ==
- Monte Alén National Park, Equatorial Guinea
- Ålen Church, Holtålen, Trøndelag, Norway; a parish church in the Church of Norway
- Ålen Station, Renbygda, Holtålen, Trøndelag, Norway; a train station

== Other uses ==
- Alen (unit of length), or Aln, a traditional Scandinavian unit of distance
- Alén Space, Spanish NewSpace company
- Industrias AlEn, Mexican chemical company

== See also ==
- Van Alen (disambiguation)
- Alan (disambiguation)
- Allan (disambiguation)
- Allen (disambiguation)
