= Van Hollen =

Van Hollen is a surname of Dutch origin. Notable people with the name include:

- Chris Van Hollen (born 1959), American politician from Maryland
- Christopher Van Hollen Sr. (1922–2013), American Foreign Service officer
- J. B. Van Hollen (born 1966), American lawyer, former Attorney General of Wisconsin
- John C. Van Hollen (1933–2025), American businessman and politician, Wisconsin State Assembly member

== See also ==
- Van Halen (disambiguation)
- Hollen, a village in Lower Saxony, Germany.
