= Alén =

Alén may refer to:

- Alén (name)
- Monte Alén National Park, Equatorial Guinea
