= Alin =

Alin may refer to:

- Alin, Iran, a village
- Arid Lands Information Network, a Kenyan NGO
- Alin, a magical civilization in the video game Rise of Nations: Rise of Legends
- Alianza de Izquierda Nacional (Alliance of the National Left), a left-wing political party in Bolivia
- Oscar Alin (1846–1900), Swedish historian and politician
- Alin Suciu (born 1978), Romanian coptologist and papyrologist
- Alin Goyan (born 1983), Armenian singer
- A-Lin (born 1983), aboriginal Taiwanese pop singer
