= Van Asten =

Van Asten is a surname. Notable people with the surname include:

- Leopold van Asten (born 1976), Dutch show jumping equestrian
- Robert van Asten (born 1978), Dutch politician

== See also ==
- Van Allen (disambiguation)
