= Van Alen =

Van Alen may refer to:

== People ==
- Cornelius Van Alen Van Dyck (1818–1895), American missionary
- James Henry Van Alen (1819–1886), American brigadier general
- James I. Van Alen (1772–1822), member of the United States House of Representatives
- James J. Van Alen (1848–1923), sportsman and politician
- Jan van Oolen (1651–1698), also referred to as Jan van Alen, Dutch painter
- Jimmy Van Alen (1902–1991), founder of the International Tennis Hall of Fame
- John Evert Van Alen (1749–1807), American surveyor, merchant, and politician
- John Trumbull Van Alen (d. 1857), American merchant and diplomat
- Margaret Van Alen Bruguiére (1876–1969), American socialite and art collector
- William Van Alen (1883–1954), American architect

== Places ==
- Van Alen Building, a block of flats in Brighton, England, UK
- Van Alen Institute, an architectural institute in New York, New York, US
- Johannis L. Van Alen Farm, an NRHP-listed estate in Stuyvesant, Columbia, New York, US
- Luykas Van Alen House, a Dutch colonial house in Kinderhook, Columbia, New York, US
- John Evert Van Alen House, an NRHP-listed home in Defreestville, Rensselaer, New York, US

== See also ==
- Alen (disambiguation)
- Van Allen (disambiguation)
