= Aland (surname) =

Aland is the surname form of the masculine given name Alan which means little rock or headstone. Notable people with the surname include:

- Barbara Aland (1937–2024), German theologian
- John Fortescue Aland, 1st Baron Fortescue of Credan (1670–1746), English lawyer, judge and politician
- Kurt Aland (1915–1994), German theologian
- Robert Aland (1836–1904), Australian politician

== See also ==
- Alland (surname)
