= Alun =

Alun may refer to:

== Places ==
- Alun, a village in Boșorod Commune, Hunedoara County, Romania
- Alun (Hungarian: Álun), a village in Bunila Commune, Hunedoara County, Romania
- Alun River, Romania
- Afon Alun, a river in the Vale of Glamorgan, Wales
- River Alyn, also known as the River Alun, Wales
- River Alun, Pembrokeshire, Wales

== Other uses ==
- Alun (given name)

== See also ==
- Alun-alun, Javanese architectural term for the large central open lawn squares common to villages, towns and cities in Indonesia
