= Alland (surname) =

Alland is a surname which may refer to:

- Joseph Alland (1894–1973), American politician
- Sandra Alland (born 1973), Scottish-Canadian writer, multimedia artist, bookseller and small press publisher
- William Alland (1916–1997), American actor, producer, writer and director

== See also ==
- Aland (surname)
