= Alen MacWeeney =

American photographer (born 1939)

Alen MacWeeney (born 1939) is an Irish photographer. MacWeeney is known for his photographs of itinerant Irish Travellers, made during a six-year period beginning in 1965.

He is the author of the photo book Irish Travellers: Tinkers No More. His work is included in the collections of the Museum of Fine Arts Houston, the Museum of Modern Art, New York and the Art Institute of Chicago.
