= Alen Stanešić =

Croatian footballer

Personal information
- Full name: Alen Stanešić
- Date of birth: March 25, 1983 (age 43)
- Place of birth: Yugoslavia
- Height: 1.81 m (5 ft 11 1/2 in)
- Position: Midfielder

Senior career*
Years	Team	Apps	(Gls)
2002–2004	Hrvatski Dragovoljac		
2003	→ Cerezo Osaka (loan)		
- * Club domestic league appearances and goals

Alen Stanešić (born March 25, 1983) is a Croatian retired football player.

== Career ==
Stanešić started his career at Hrvatski Dragovoljac in 2002. In 2003, he moved to Japanese J1 League club, Cerezo Osaka on loan. In summer 2003, he returned to Hrvatski Dragovoljac.
