= Van Allen Range =

Mountain range in Antarctica

Van Allen Range (78°9′S 159°30′E) is a range 14 nautical miles (26 km) long that includes Escalade Peak (2035 m), Tate Peak and Mount Marvel, located at the south margin of Skelton Neve between Boomerang Range and Worcester Range. It was named after James A. Van Allen, an American scientist and one of the original organizers of the International Geophysical Year of 1957–58. He conducted ionospheric research in the Arctic and Antarctic regions and is the discoverer of the Van Allen radiation belts.
