= Gareth Alun Owens =

British-Greek academic (born 1964)

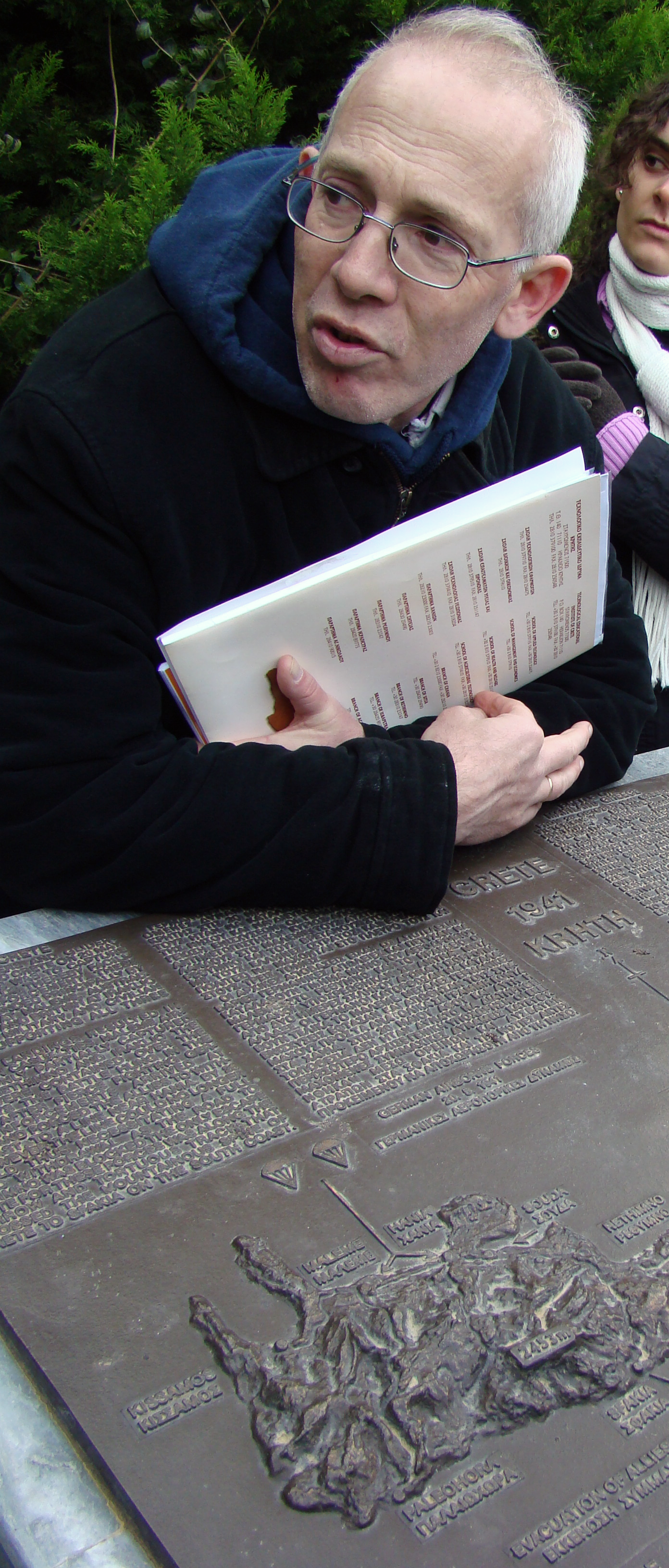
Gareth Owens

Gareth Alun Owens (born 1964) is a British-Greek academic, currently serving as associate director and «Erasmus/Socrates» Manager/Tutor of the International Relations Office of the Hellenic Mediterranean University (formerly Technological Educational Institute of Crete) and as associate professor of Hellenic Culture -- History, Language and Civilization. He is notable for his contributions to Linear B studies and for his attempts to coordinate the efforts of academics to decipher Linear A.

== Biography ==
Owens read Classics at University College London, completing a master's thesis on Linear B and a thesis on the problem of Linear A for his Ph.D. in archaeology. He has taught at London and at the University of Crete and has authored several publications in both English and modern Greek.

Owens is married to a Greek archaeologist (Kalliope Nikolidaki) with whom he frequently collaborates. He has earned the Modern Greek Diploma of Proficiency from the National and Capodistrian University of Athens where he took a second Ph.D. in linguistics. Owens applied for and was granted citizenship. In fulfilling his obligations as a male Greek citizen, Owens briefly served in the Hellenic Army. In addition to his academic postings, Owens has worked as a translator for the BBC and taught English on Crete. Recently, Owens served as the professor for the Sigma Phi Epsilon 2010 Tragos Quest and taught Greek literature and history to 16 of the fraternity's top leaders.

== Linear A ==
Owens postulates that the phonetic values of ninety-percent of Linear A characters correspond to those of Linear B figures of similar appearance. A full ten characters do not admit analysis in terms of Linear B, and Owens can only speculate about their meaning. Using his system of correspondences, Owens has uncovered several place names which appear in the Linear B tablets and figure prominently in the archaeological history of Crete. In addition, he believes that he has found evidence of grammatical gender for nouns and nomen agentis, as well as vocabulary and noun and verb endings that to him indicate the underlying "Minoan" language of the Linear A tablets to be an Indo-European language of the Satem branch.

Owens has founded the Daedalic Theme Network to foster collaboration on Linear A decipherment and other Minoan issues.

== Publications ==
=== Books ===
- ΔΑΙΔΑΛΙΚΑ – Γραφές και Γλώσσες της Μινωικής και Μυκηναϊκής Κρήτης 20 Essays in Modern Greek (1991–96) Scripts and Languages of Minoan and Mycenaean (Herakleion:1996)
- KRITIKA DAIDALIKA — 20 Selected Essays in Memory of James T. Hooker on the Archaeology, Epigraphy and Philology of Minoan and Mycenaean Crete (Amsterdam & Las Palmas, Gran Canarias:1997) ISBN 90-256-1096-X.
- Evidence for Indo-European Language in the Minoan Documents — 5 Selected Articles on Minoan and Mycenaean Crete in memory and honour of Michael Ventris and John Chadwick to celebrate 50 years since the publication of “Evidence for Greek Dialect in the Mycenaean Archives”, Journal of Hellenic Studies 73, 1953, 84-103 and Documents in Mycenaean Greek, 1956, Monograph DO-SO-MO Fascicula Mycenologica Polona 6 (Piotrków Trybunalski:2006)

=== DVD ===
- The Scripts of Knossos — Heraklion, a City through the Ages, Municipality of Heraklion and University of Crete, 2004.

== See also ==
- Linear A
- Linear B
- Minoan civilization
- Mycenaean Greece
- Decipherment
