= Alyn =

Alyn may refer to:

== Places ==
- Alyn Gorge, a gorge section of the River Alyn
- River Alyn, a tributary of the River Dee
- Ogof Hesp Alyn, a cave
- Bryn Alyn, a hill
- Alyn Waters, a country park situated in the county of Wrexham

== People ==
=== Given name ===
- Alyn Ainsworth, a British singer and dance band conductor
- Alyn Beals, a professional American football player
- Alyn Camara, a German long jumper
- Alyn McCauley, a Canadian professional ice hockey player
- Alyn Shipton, an English jazz author
- Alyn Smith, a Scottish politician
- Alyn Ware, a New Zealand peace educator

=== Middle name ===
- Emily Alyn Lind, an American actress
- E. Alyn Warren, an American actor
- Barbara Alyn Woods, an American actress

=== Surname ===
- Kirk Alyn, an American actor
- Marc Alyn, a French poet

=== Fictional characters ===
- Alyn Shir, a character in Kingdoms of Amalur: Reckoning

== Other ==
- ALYN Hospital, a comprehensive rehabilitation center
- Ysgol Bryn Alyn, a secondary school in the county borough of Wrexham
