= Alin Goyan =

Alin Goyan Ալին Գոյան
- Born: 1983
- Origin: Yerevan, Armenia
- Genres: World, classical, pop
- Years active: 2010-present
- Labels: AZD Productions
- Website: alingoyan.com

Alin Goyan (Armenian: Ալին Գոյան) is an Armenian music singer from Yerevan, Armenia. Her repertoire includes traditional music from Komitas as well as pop songs.

She started to attend vocal music school of voice conservation when she was six, appeared at big Armenian stages and traveled with talented children to a number of European countries. She graduated as a lawyer and worked for several years in this profession until she realized that music was her real love, and entered the Yerevan Conservatory.

== Music career ==
On 26 May 2011, Alin released a music video titled Krunk. She is working on her first album containing 10 works of Komitas Vardapet with contemporary perception, of which six are recorded as of now. It is expected in October 2012. She sang duets with rock singer Vahag Rush in June 2012 and a second concert is announced for November 2012.
