= Industrias AlEn =

International cleaning product manufacturer

Industrias AlEn is a Mexican chemical products company with headquarters in Monterrey. Industrias AlEn manufactures household cleaning products under name brands such as Cloralen, Pinol, Pinalen, Flash, Ensueño, among others . Currently, the sales office for the US and Caribbean markets is located in Houston.

Clorox brought a trademark-infringement case against Industrias AlEn before the U.S. International Trade Commission in 2013, alleging that AlEn's Cloralex and Pinol products closely mimicked the Clorox and Pine-Sol brands. AlEn subsequently counter-sued, alleging breach of contract of a 1995 "coexistence" agreement that allowed AlEn to sell its products in the U.S. on the condition of not using certain styles in its packaging that might infringe on Clorox's designs.
