= Alen Oroz =

Austrian footballer

Personal information
- Full name: Alen Oroz
- Date of birth: 6 September 1984 (age 42)
- Place of birth: Vienna, Austria
- Height: 1.90 m (6 ft 3 in)
- Position: Defender

Team information
- Current team: FC Lustenau 07

Senior career*
Years	Team	Apps	(Gls)
2005–2006	Wiener SC	26	(1)
2006–2007	Rapid Wien II	19	(0)
2007–2008	FC Lustenau 07	19	(0)
2008–2009	NK Široki Brijeg	15	(0)
2009–	FC Lustenau 07		

International career
- Austria U17
- Austria U18
- * Club domestic league appearances and goals as of August 3, 2009

Alen Oroz (born 6 September 1984) is an Austrian footballer playing for FC Lustenau 07 since 2009.

He had previously played with NK Široki Brijeg in the Premier League of Bosnia and Herzegovina.
