= William Van Alen =

American architect

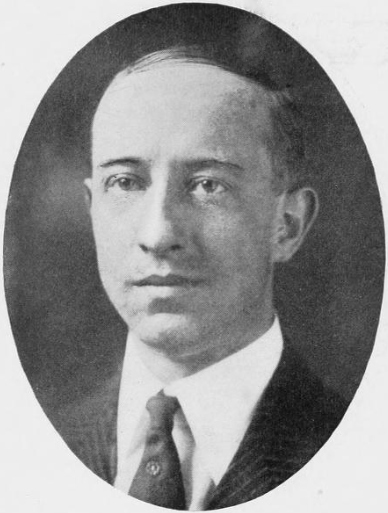
- Born: August 10, 1883; Brooklyn, New York, US
- Died: May 24, 1954 (aged 70); New York City, US
- Education: Pratt Institute, Atelier Masqueray
- Occupation: Architect
- Practice: Clinton & Russell
- Buildings: Chrysler Building

William Van Alen (August 10, 1883 – May 24, 1954) was an American architect, best known as the architect in charge of designing New York City's Chrysler Building (1928–30).

== Life ==
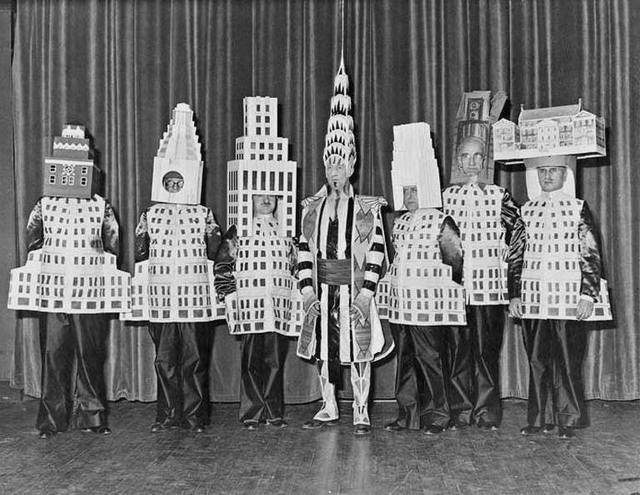
Van Alen (middle) dressed as the Chrysler Building at a 1931 ball

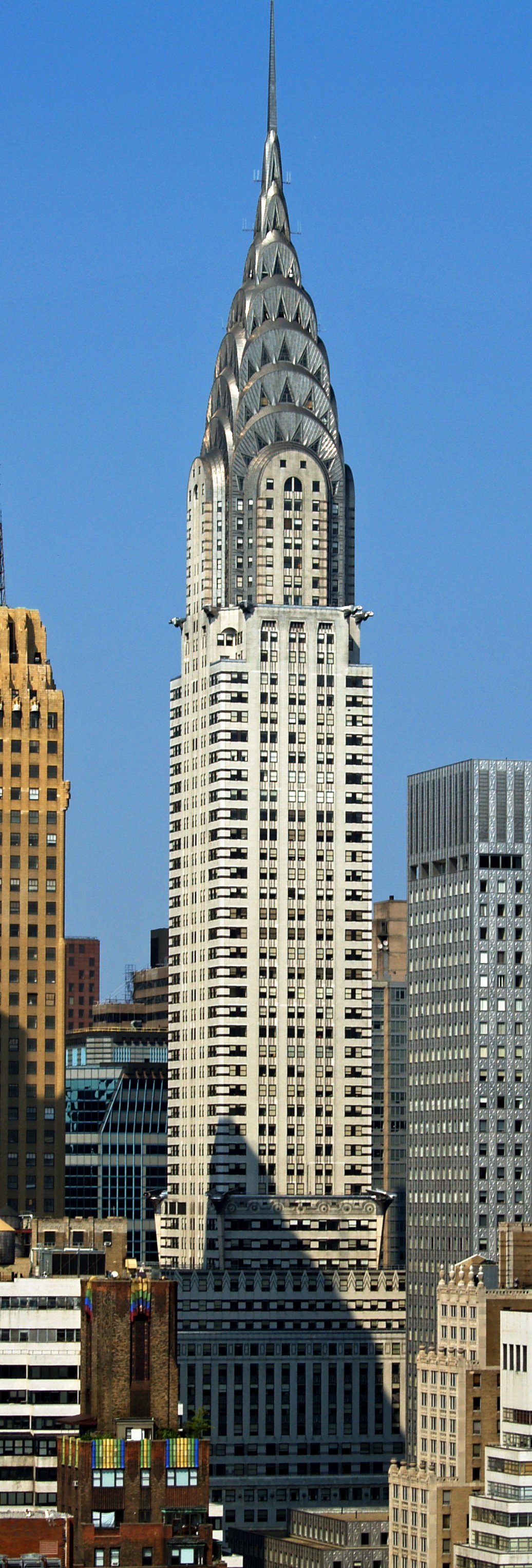
Chrysler Building

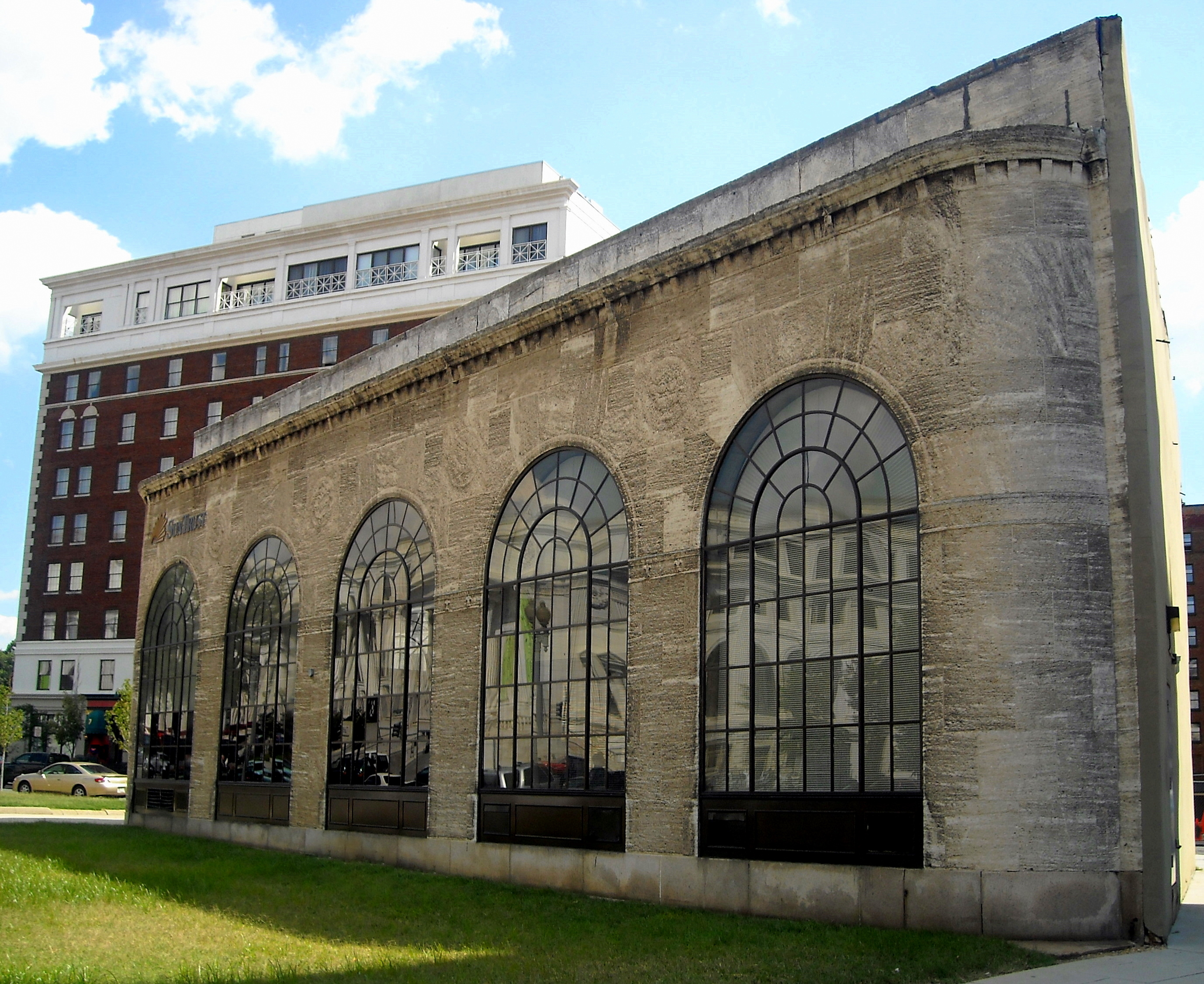
Former Childs Restaurant in Washington, DC

William Van Alen was born in Brooklyn, New York, in 1883. He attended Pratt Institute while working for the architect Clarence True. He also studied for three years at the Atelier Masqueray, the first independent architectural atelier in the United States, founded by Franco-American architect Emmanuel Louis Masqueray.

After finishing his studies, Van Alen worked for firms in New York, notably working on the Hotel Astor in 1902 for Clinton & Russell, before he was awarded the Paris Prize scholarship in 1908. The scholarship led to his studying in Paris, in the atelier of Victor Laloux at the École des Beaux-Arts.

By the time Van Alen returned to New York in 1910, he had become interested in new architectural styles, including the modernism for which he later became known. In 1911 he formed a partnership with H. Craig Severance, another architect with similar professional interests but a very different personal style. Severance was gregarious and charming, while Van Alen was more introverted. The partnership prospered and became known for its distinctive multistory commercial structures. It completed a building in 1914 in Lower Manhattan that was notable for having storefront windows that were flush with the walls rather than set back, an innovation that later became a standard practice. In the 1920s, Severance and Van Alen began to get bigger commissions, but their relationship grew more strained due to their personal differences, and the partnership dissolved in 1924.

Severance and Van Alen continued to practice on their own in New York, but Van Alen found it difficult to obtain large commissions and sustained his office with smaller commissions. In the mid-1920s he received two of these from Childs Restaurants, an early restaurant chain that was known for the quality of its architecture. His design for 604 Fifth Avenue, a slender six-story building in Midtown Manhattan completed in 1925, incorporated curved glass corner windows which lacked a supporting corner post, another innovation that later became common. This building, which housed a Childs restaurant on its lower floors, garnered notice from Le Corbusier and other prominent architecture critics. His design for another Childs location at 2 Massachusetts Ave. NW in Washington, DC, completed in 1926, was very different. A single-story stone structure on a small triangular plot near Union Station, it featured large arched windows. Though Childs vacated both structures in the 1950s, they were extant and in use in 2014, the Manhattan building as a restaurant and the Washington building as a bank.

In the late 1920s, Severance and Van Alen found themselves engaged in designing buildings that were heralded in the press to become the tallest buildings in the world: Severance, the Manhattan Trust Building 40 Wall Street and Van Alen, the Chrysler Building. At 1,046 feet (319 m), Van Alen's building won. However, both buildings were surpassed in height by the Empire State Building in 1931.

The completion of the Chrysler Building was received by critics with mixed reactions. Van Alen was hailed as a "Doctor of Altitude" and as "the Ziegfeld of his profession." However, the building itself was described by some critics as just flash which "embodies no compelling, organic idea" and which was "distinctly a stunt design, evolved to make the man in the street look up" but having "no significance as serious design." Nevertheless, the Chrysler Building remains a beloved New York City landmark structure.

Van Alen had failed to enter into a contract with Walter Chrysler when he received the Chrysler Building commission. After the building was completed, Van Alen requested payment of 6 percent of the building's construction budget ($14 million), a figure that was the standard fee of the time. After Chrysler refused payment, Van Alen sued him and won, eventually receiving the fee. The lawsuit significantly depreciated his reputation as an employable architect. After his career was effectively ruined by this, and further let down by the Great Depression, Van Alen focused his attention on teaching sculpture at the Beaux-Arts Institute of Design, which would later be named in his honor.

== Legacy ==
Van Alen lent his name to the Van Alen Institute, a New York City-based nonprofit organization that is dedicated to improving design in the public realm through a program of exhibitions, competitions, publications, workshops, and forums and is an advocate for active and accessible waterfronts. Founded in 1894 as the Society of Beaux-Arts Architects, the Institute was renamed in 1996 in honor of Van Alen, its largest benefactor; at this time the organization was reorganized to focus on the public realm. The Institute's projects initiate interdisciplinary and international collaborations between practitioners, policymakers, students, educators, and community leaders.

The Van Alen Building, a neo-Art Deco/Streamline Moderne luxury apartment block on the seafront in Brighton, England, was also named after him. The 38-apartment development was built between 1999 and 2001.
