= John Delbert Van Allen =

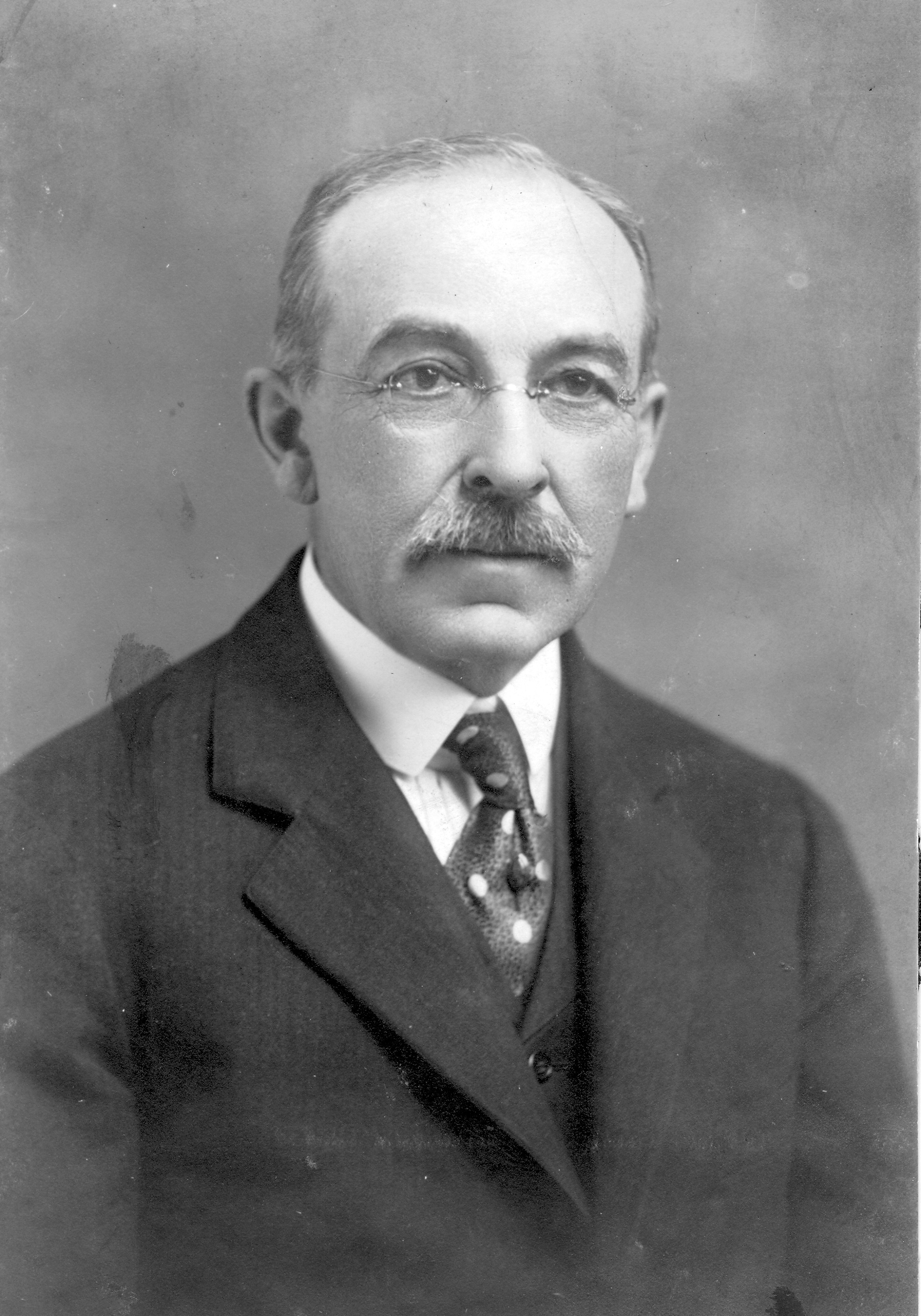
- Van Allen in 1919
- Born: October 5, 1850; Crystal Lake, Illinois
- Died: December 30, 1928; Clinton, Iowa
- Occupation(s): Retailer, Department Store Owner
- Spouse: Alice Jane Holmes
- Children: Frederick Holmes Van Allen & Bessie Dell Van Allen Morris
- Parent: Abram Van Allen & Olive Ransom

John Delbert Van Allen was an American retail dry goods merchant and department store owner who came to Clinton, Iowa in 1892 and established a department store that was the last surviving traditional store of its type in the city. He is most noted nationally for having hired Louis Sullivan to design the Van Allen Building that is now listed as a National Historic Landmark.

Mr. Van Allen applied for membership in the Holland Society of New York on August 10, 1908 and was admitted on October 8, 1908. He was a direct lineal descendant of Laurens Van Allen who was a resident of New Amsterdam in 1658. (Application below)

== Gallery ==
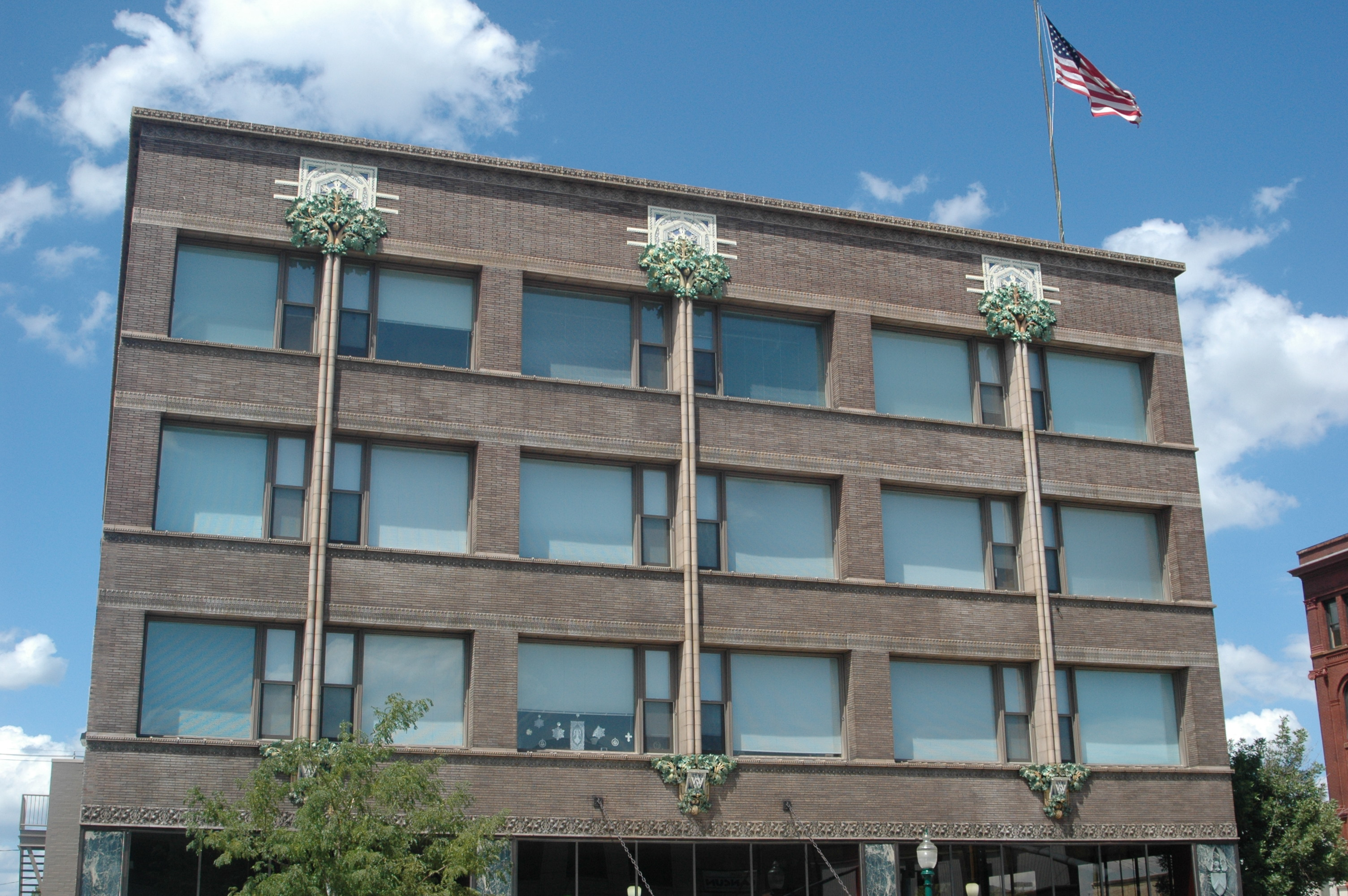
Van Allen Building, A National Historic Landmark

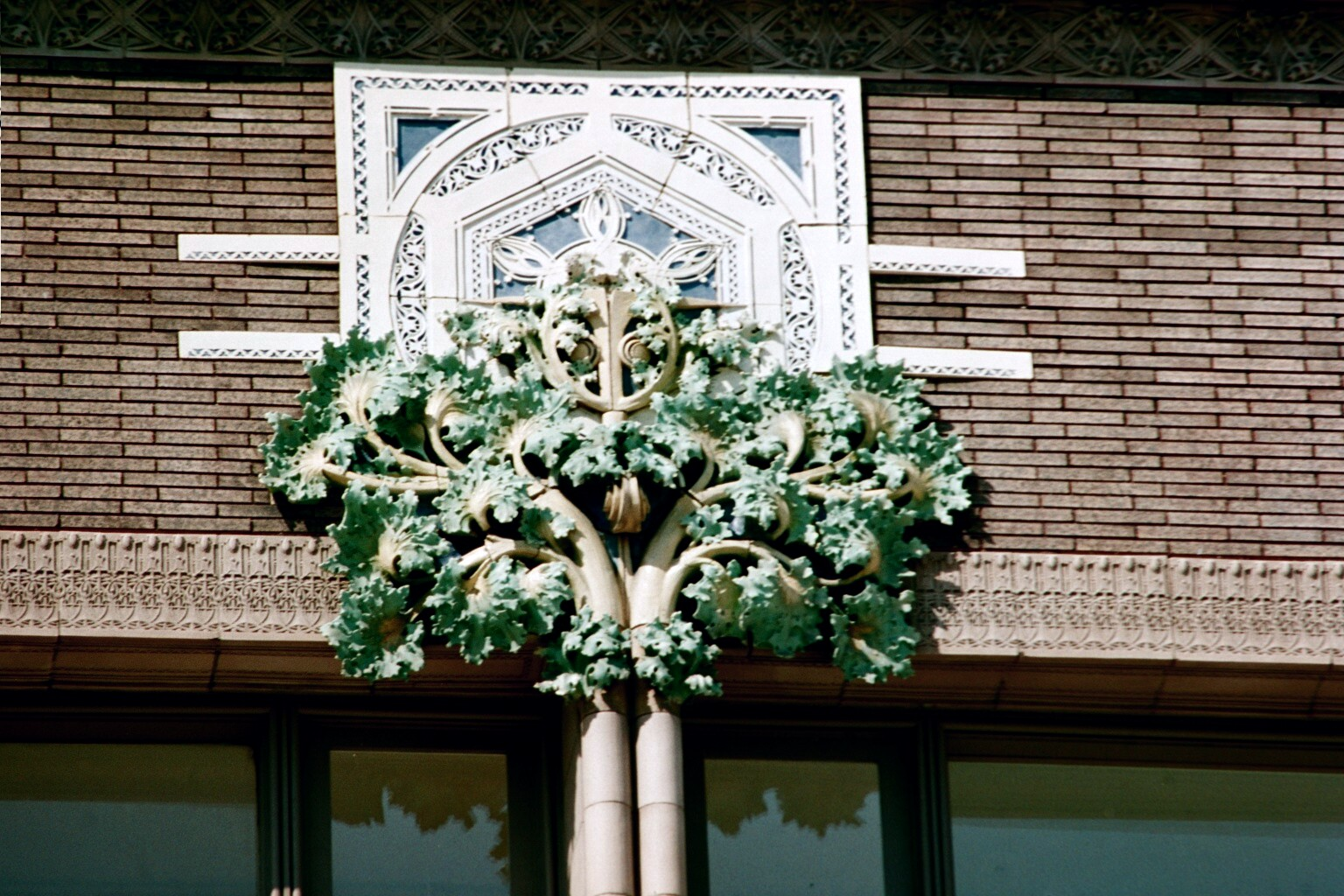
The Van Allen Building, Column Capital

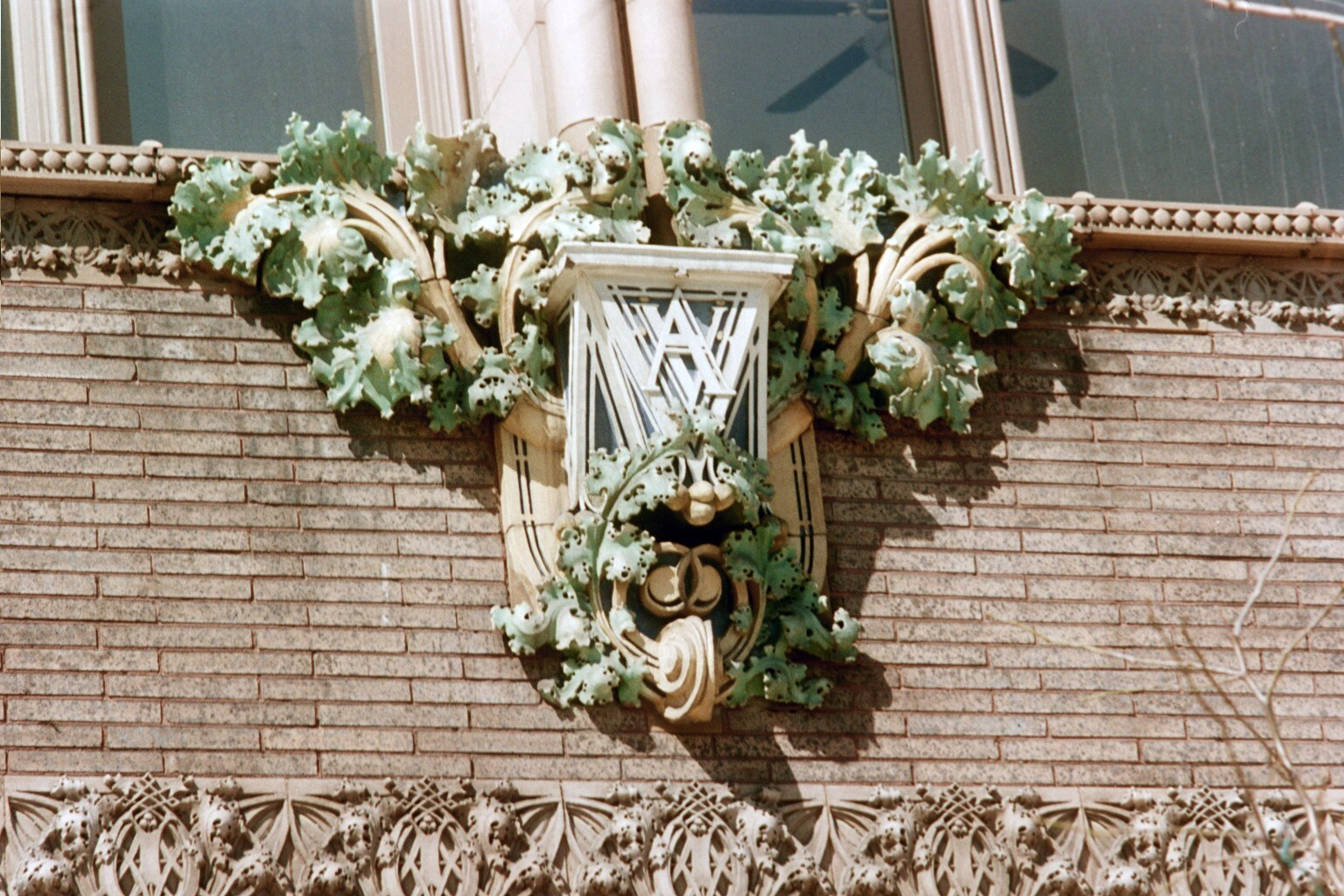
Detail of ornamentation of the Van Allen Building

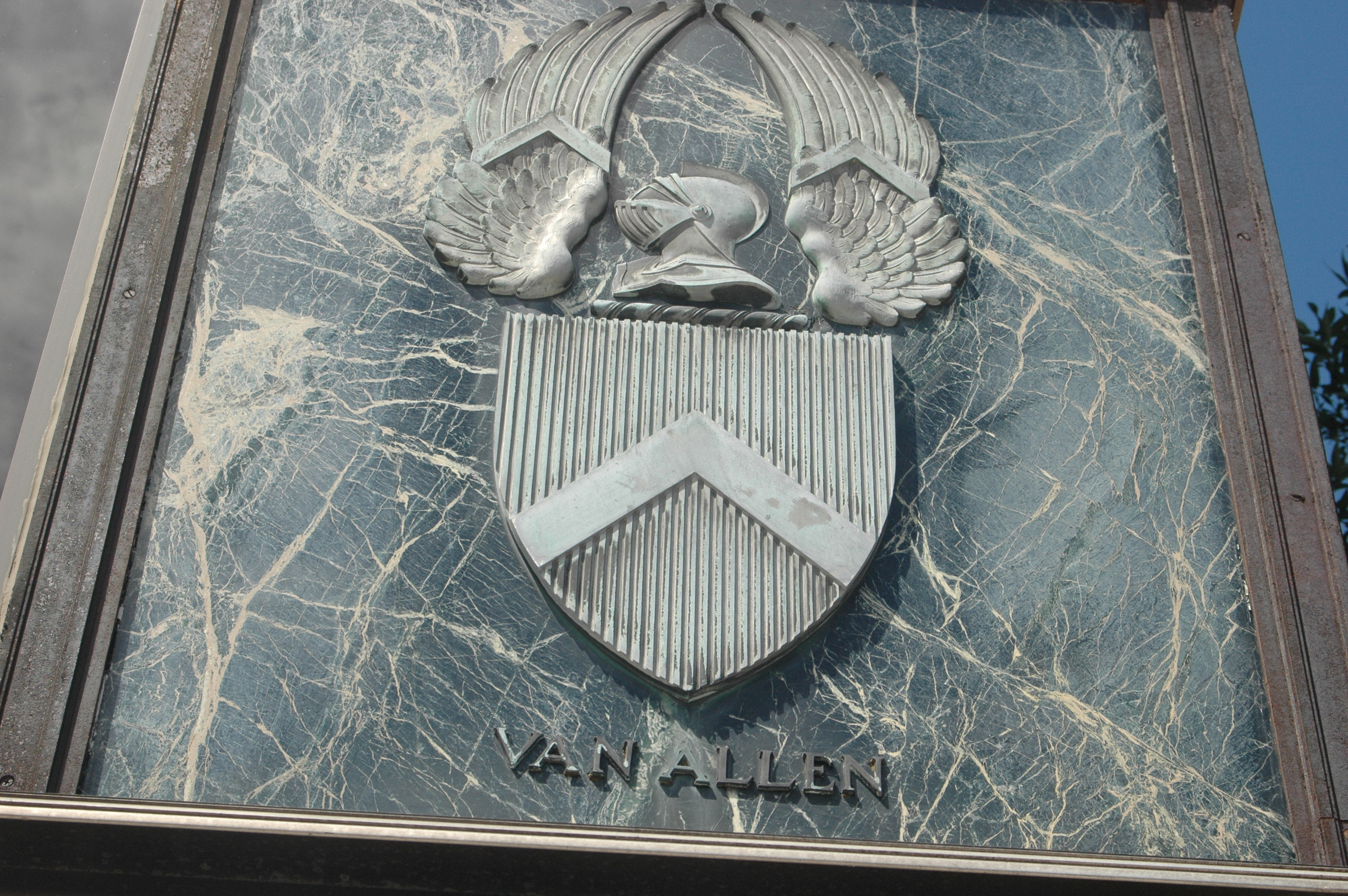
Van Allen family crest

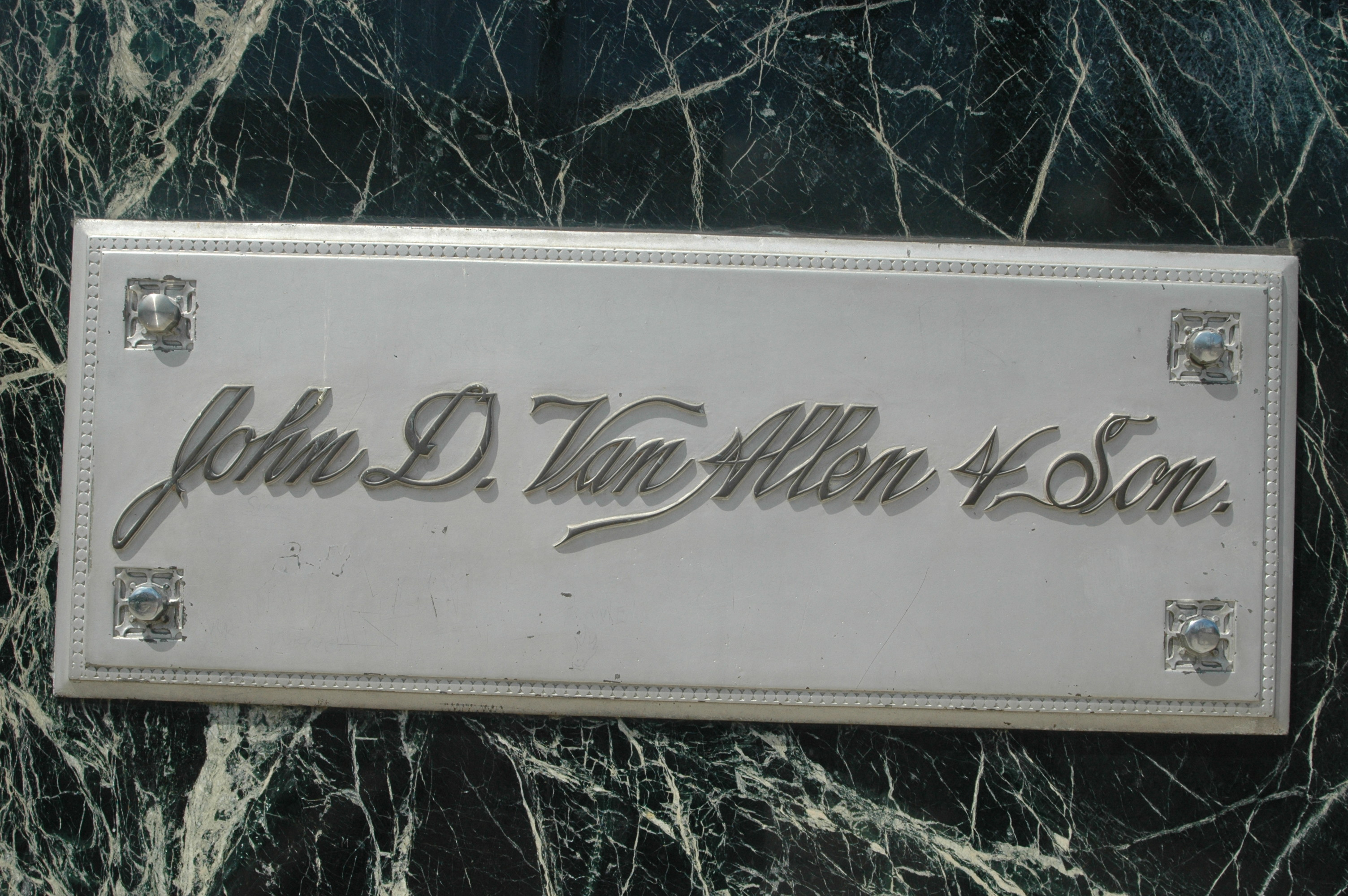
John D. Van Allen & Son

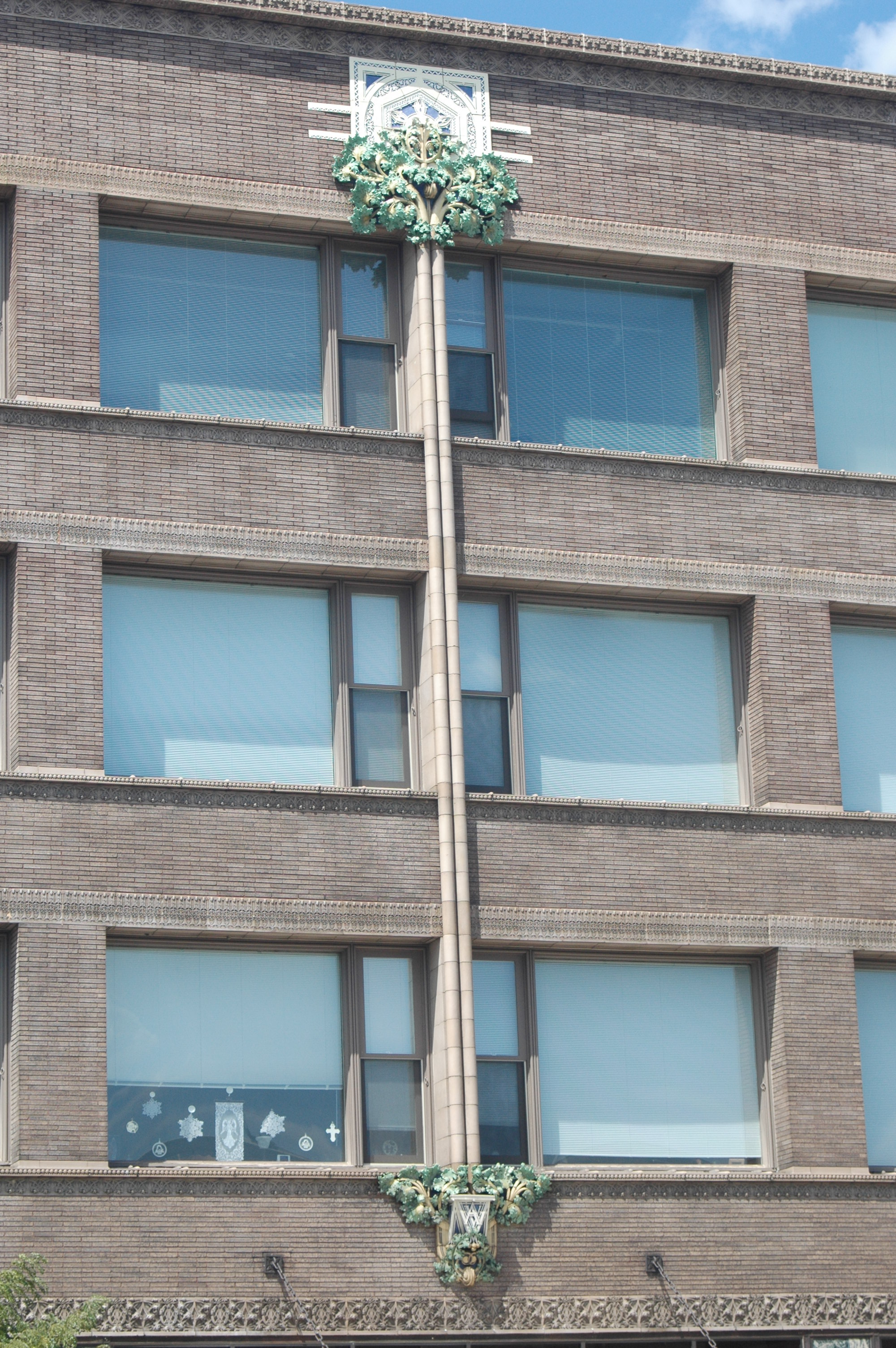
Van Allen building front elevation detail

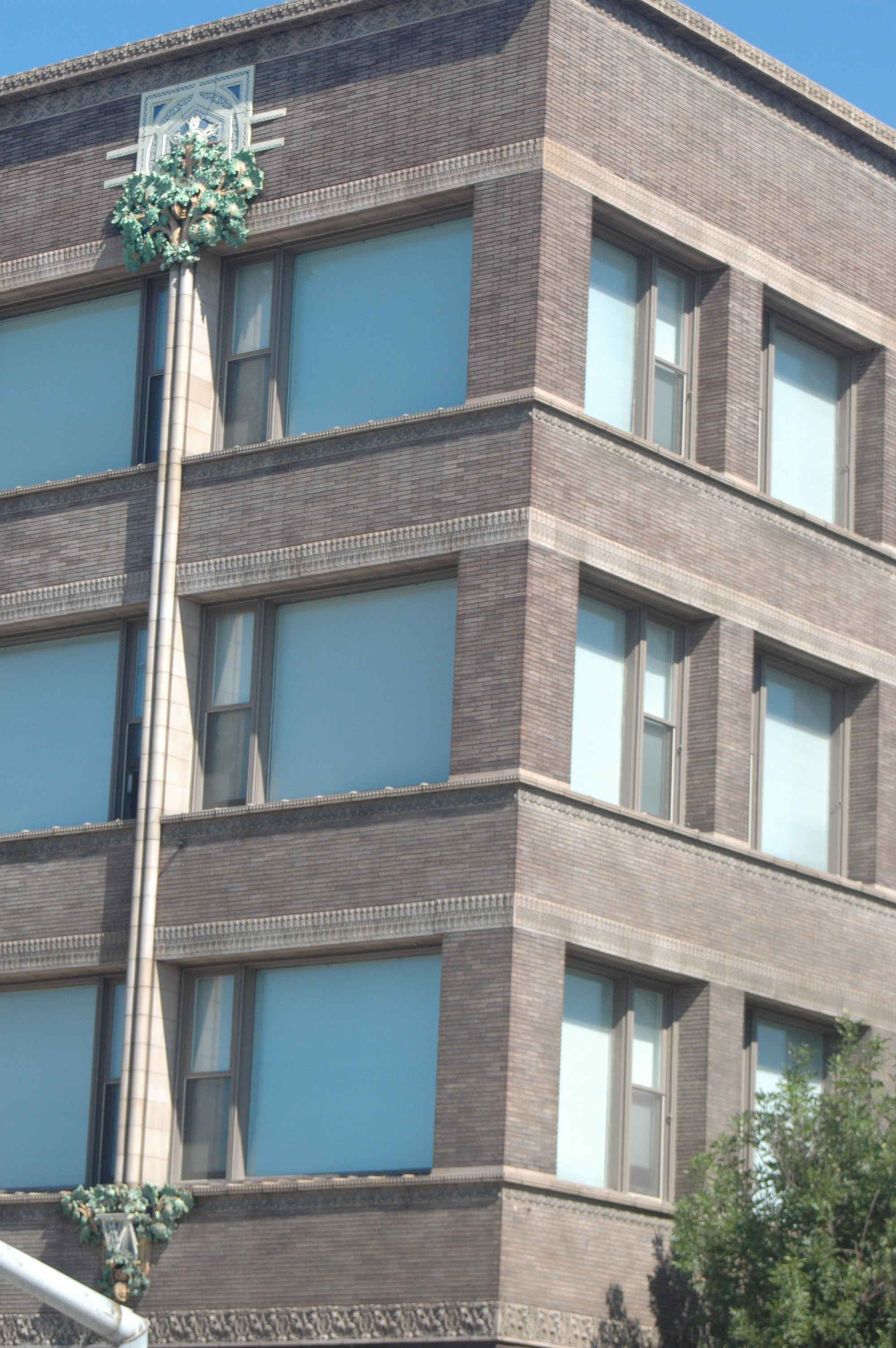
Van Allen building SE corner detail

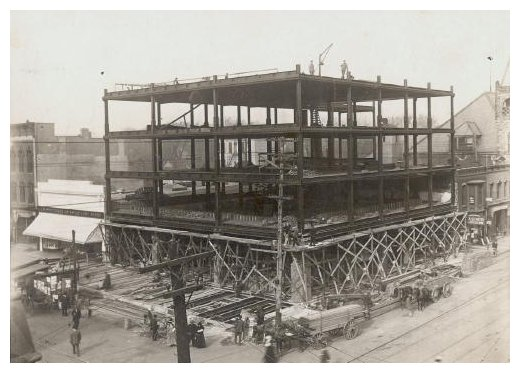
Van Allen building under construction in 1913

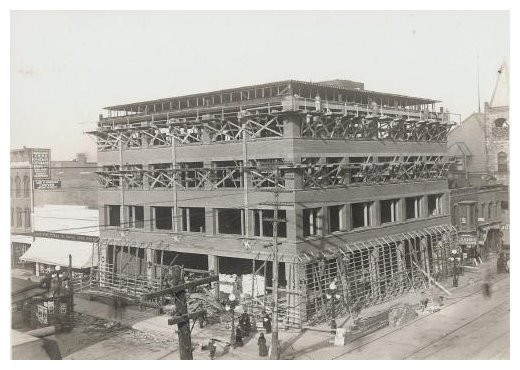
Van Allen building under construction in 1914

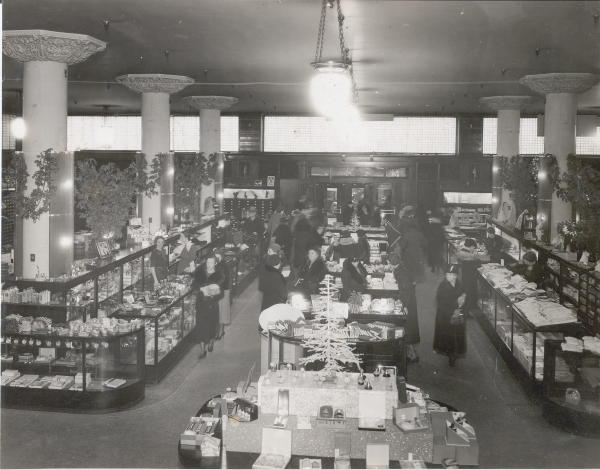
Van Allen Store 1934

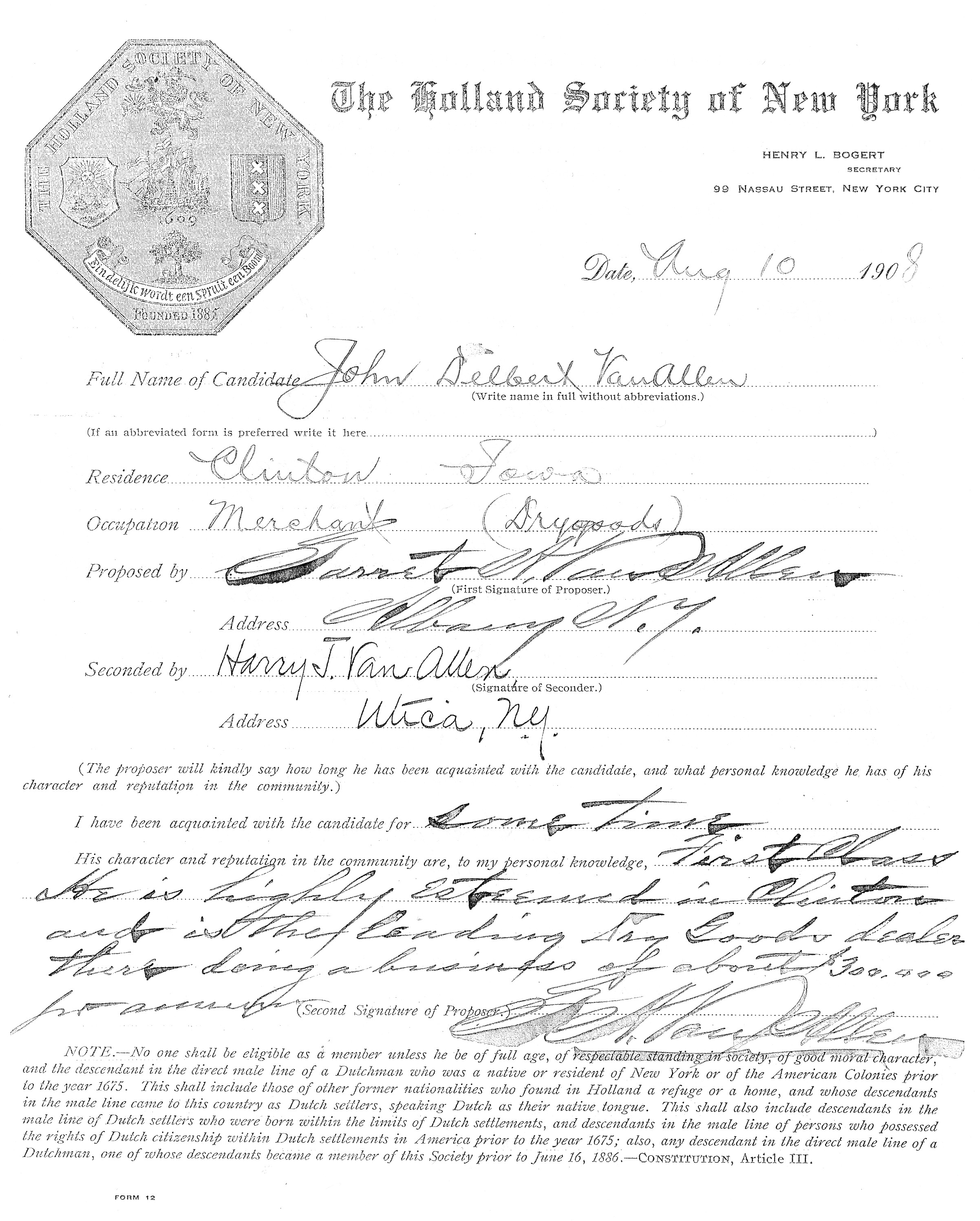
John D. Van Allen application Holland Society of New York

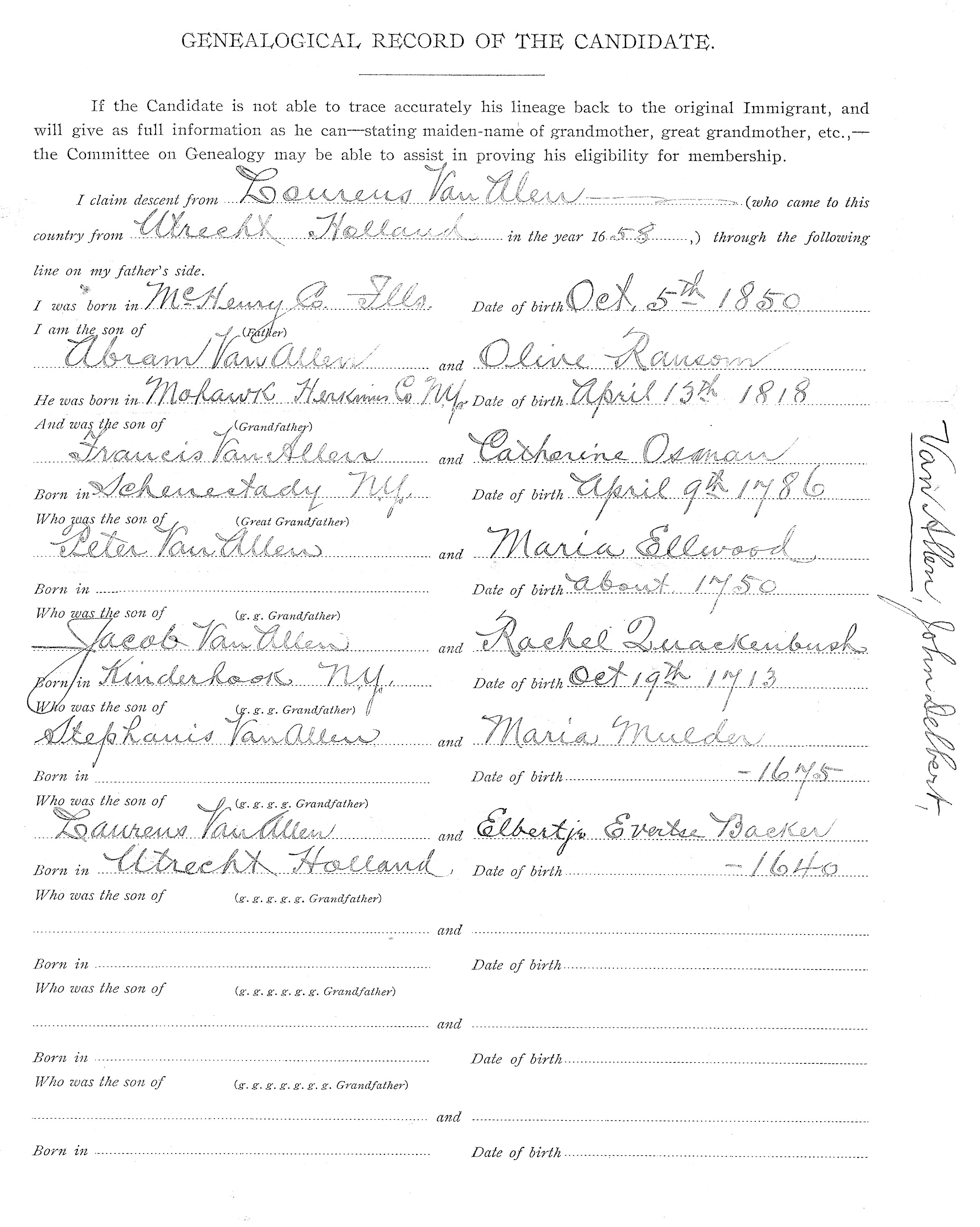
John D. Van Allen application Holland Society of New York reverse side
