= Alun Wyn Davies =

Welsh rugby union player

Alun-Wyn Davies is a Welsh rugby union player who was previously a prop for Coventry R.F.C. As of January 2011 he now plays hooker for Llandovery R.F.C. Alun travelled north at 18 to join the Leeds Rhinos before returning to the Neath RFC, then Swansea RFC for over 9 years as well as representing The Ospreys 2004 - 2006

Alun has been a scrum and defence coach for over 14 years, coaching Ospreys academy for 5 years, 4 six nations and a World Cup in 2014 with welsh women’s national team. 5 years as director of rugby at Cardiff University after sending 3 years with welsh premiership club Bridgend ravens as scrum and defence coach and in 2022 taking over as head coach.
