= Van Allen Building =

Commercial building in Clinton, Iowa, US

- Van Allen and Company Department Store
- U.S. National Register of Historic Places
- U.S. National Historic Landmark
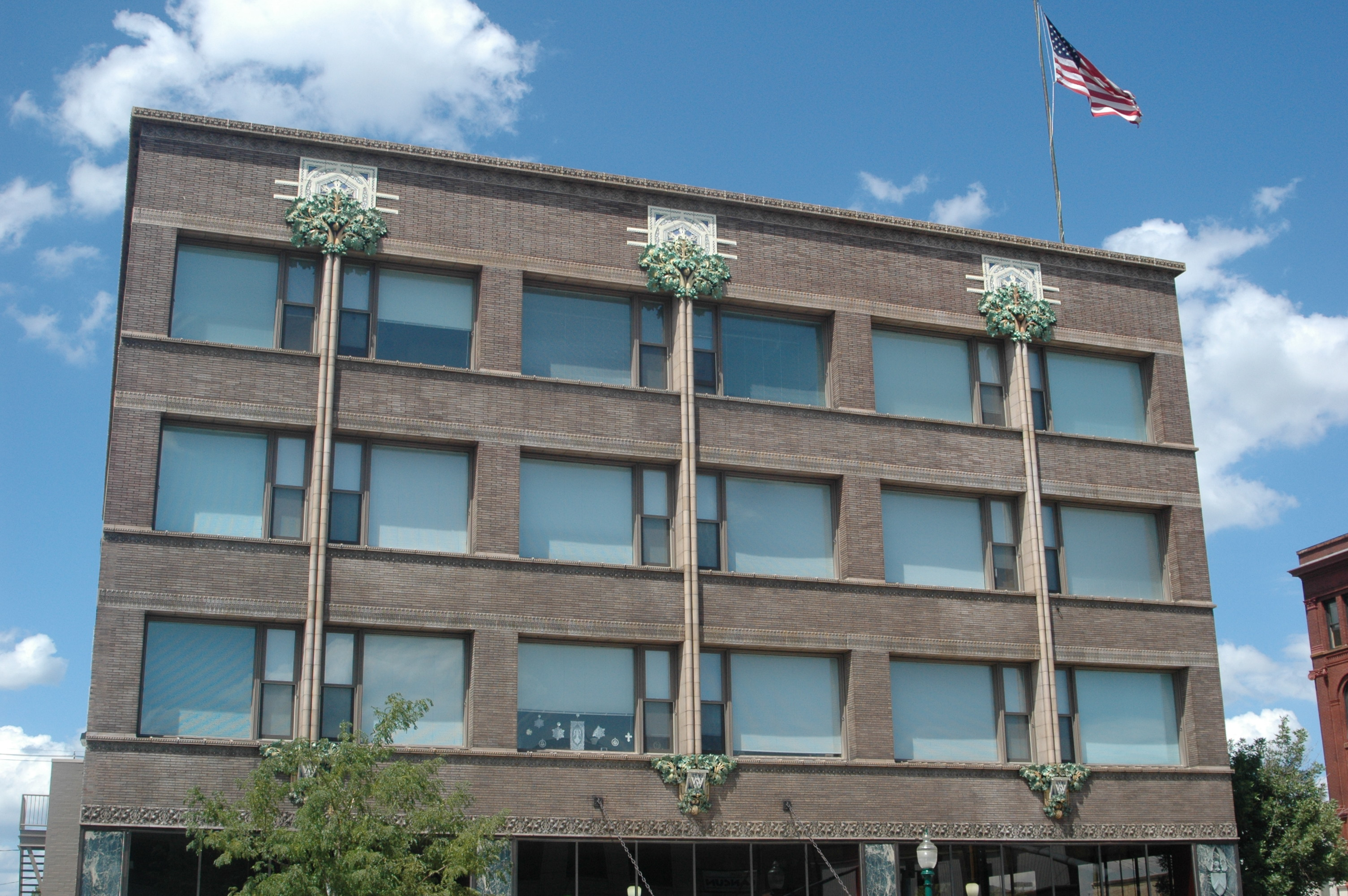

- Location within Iowa Location within the United States
- Interactive map of Van Allen and Company Department Store
- Location: Northwest corner of Fifth Avenue South and Second Street; Clinton, Iowa, US
- Coordinates: 41°50′28.95″N 90°11′17.98″W
- Built: 1913
- Architect: Louis Sullivan
- NRHP reference No.: 76000753

Significant dates
- Added to NRHP: January 7, 1976
- Designated NHL: January 7, 1976

The Van Allen Building, also known as Van Allen and Company Department Store, is a historic building at the northwest corner of Fifth Avenue South and Second Street in Clinton, Iowa, United States. The four-story building was designed by Louis Sullivan and commissioned by John Delbert Van Allen. Constructed between 1913 and 1914 as a department store, it has since been converted into an apartment building with commercial space. The Van Allen Building was declared a National Historic Landmark in 1976 for its architecture.

Unlike Sullivan's earlier work, the design includes some purely decorative elements, and the interior arrangement influenced the design of the facade. The ground floor has storefront windows and entrances, while the upper stories have a brick facade with terracotta decorations such as three decorative mullions. The building has a steel frame, which divides the interior spaces into aisles, alongside mechanical features such as pneumatic tube and forced-air systems. The structure spans 45,000 square feet (4,200 m^{2}) and originally had store departments on each floor, along with a balcony above the first floor. The modern apartment building has retail on the ground floor, 19 apartments on the upper stories, and an atrium. Over the years, the building's design has received mixed commentary.

Van Allen took over an existing store on the site in 1892 and, after a series of expansions, began planning a new store building in 1910. Following a recommendation from another of Sullivan's clients in Iowa, Van Allen hired Sullivan the next year. The store opened in September 1914 and was remodeled several times over the next half-century. Petersen-Harned-Von Maur took over the store in 1968 and operated it until its closure in 1987. Afterward, Crombie Taylor led efforts to restore the building, which partially reopened in 1991. Following unsuccessful attempts to find some other use for the building, Heartland Properties and Community Housing Initiatives converted it to housing between 2001 and 2003.

== Site ==
The Van Allen Building is located at the northwest corner of Fifth Avenue South and Second Street in Clinton, Iowa, United States. Second Street runs north–south along the lot's eastern boundary, and Fifth Avenue South runs west–east at the southern boundary. As built, the structure occupied a site with frontage of 86 feet (26 m) on Fifth Avenue South and 90 feet (27 m) on Second Street. The westernmost bay measures 22 feet (6.7 m) wide and extends 140 feet (43 m) north–south, creating an annex extending north from the lot's northwestern corner. The maximum dimensions of the lot are thus 86 by 140 feet (26 by 43 m).

Before the building was constructed in the 1910s, the intersection of Fifth Avenue South and Second Street had been the commercial center of the small town of Clinton, since it was near the banks of the Mississippi River. The corner contained the Young Block, which had a mercantile store, grocer, photographer, blacksmith, hotel, and clubhouse. The building's first occupant, Van Allen & Son Company, had occupied an earlier structure on the same site. Several blocks to the south are the Clinton Railroad Bridge (which was completed in 1909, just before the building was erected) and the Gateway Bridge for road traffic. When the current building was constructed, the company's founder, John Delbert Van Allen, had proposed installing elaborate electroliers on Fifth Avenue South to complement the building's construction.

== Architecture ==
The Van Allen Building was designed for the John D. Van Allen & Son Company by Louis Sullivan as a four-story, steel framed building. The design shares significant design features with Sullivan's previous designs for early skyscrapers. In particular, the steel frame is similar to Sullivan's high-rise designs, and the articulation (or arrangement) of the facade is a scaled-down version of the articulation used in Sullivan's earlier Carson Pirie Scott Store in Chicago. In contrast to other structures, the exterior was designed only after the interior details had been laid out. John B. Van Allen—the grandson of the original proprietor, John D. Van Allen—said that Sullivan's design had been forward-looking even when it was built in 1913, incorporating features such as space for a second elevator shaft. The steel frame was intended to accommodate three extra stories (for a total of seven) if the need arose.

Sullivan designed the building immediately after finishing St. Paul United Methodist Church in Cedar Rapids, Iowa; at the time, he was in the midst of designing his jewel box banks in the Midwest. The Van Allen commission was one of five commissions Sullivan received in Iowa. It came after the Peoples Savings Bank and St. Paul's Church in Cedar Rapids, and before the Henry Adams Building in Algona and the Merchants' National Bank in Grinnell. It was the only department store Sullivan designed for a smaller city.

=== Facade ===
Since the Van Allen Building was relatively short and wide, Sullivan articulated it horizontally, with horizontal spandrel panels and wide windows. The facade is divided into five bays on its eastern elevation and three on its southern elevation, the latter corresponding to the aisles inside. On the southern elevation, the bays are asymmetrical (gradually widening from west to east) to avoid a neighboring property on the western end, and to accommodate the depth of Second Street's storefront displays on the eastern end. Similarly, because of the storefront displays on Fifth Avenue South, the eastern elevation's southernmost (left) bay is wider than the others. (Note: The widths of the southern elevation's bays are as follows: Western bay: 25 7/8 feet (7.9 m); Center bay: 28 1/4 feet (8.6 m); Eastern bay: 30 37/48 feet (9.38 m); The eastern elevation's bays are 16 feet (4.9 m) wide except for the southernmost bay, which is 22 37/48 feet (6.94 m) wide.)

In contrast to Sullivan's earlier work, which tended toward a more functional "form follows function" philosophy, the Van Allen Building has decorative elements that do not serve any structural purpose. Terracotta trim is used throughout the facade. Kristian Schneider, a craftsman who had collaborated with Sullivan on several previous projects, executed the decorations for the Van Allen Building.

==== Ground story ====
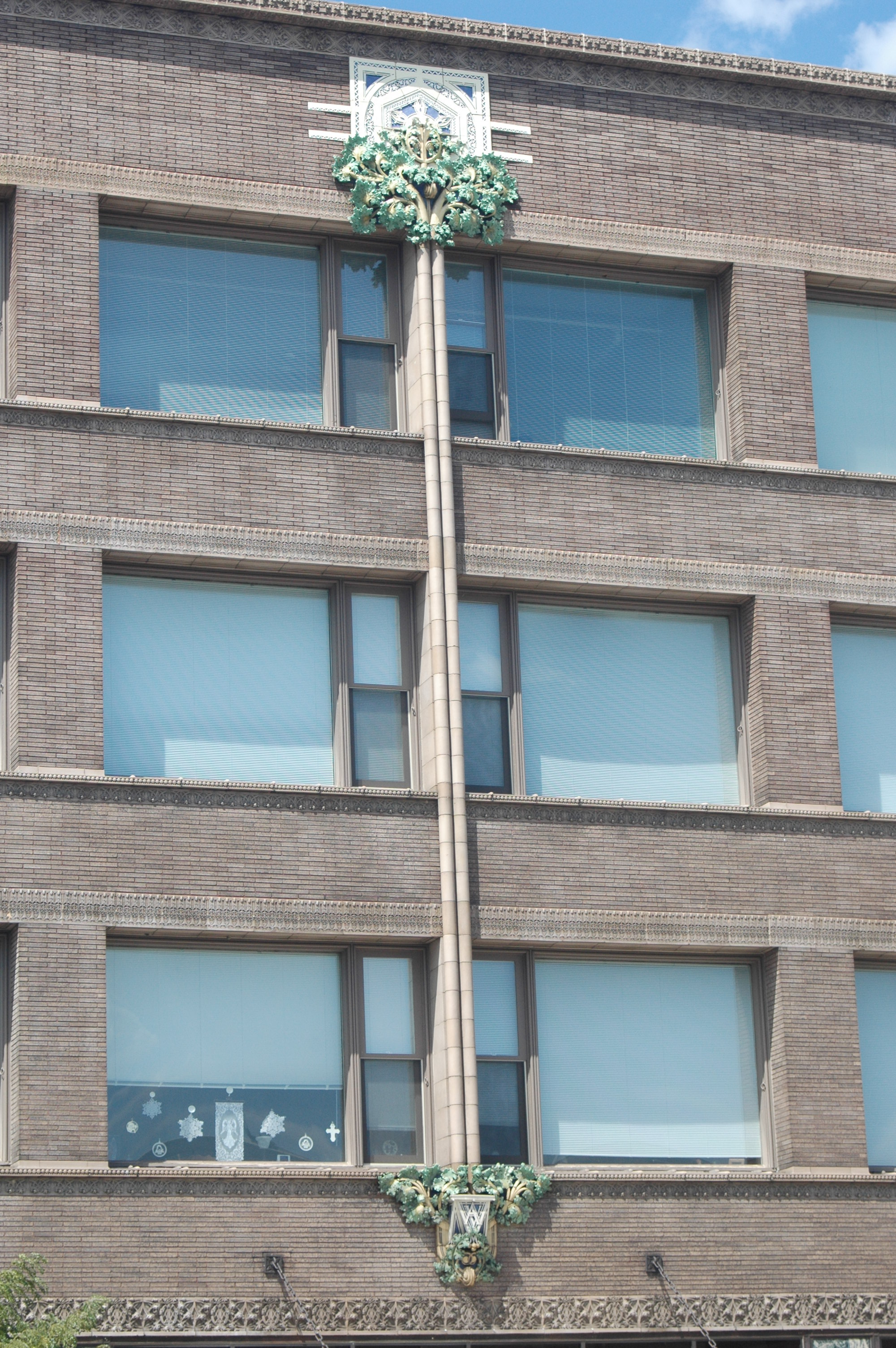
A slender terracotta mullion on the southern elevation, topped by medallions with foliate ornament

At ground level, the building was constructed with a main entrance on Fifth Avenue South, a side door on Second Street, and a third entrance for patrons of the haberdashery. The haberdasher's entrance was designed in a nondescript manner, to allow men to visit the haberdashery without drawing attention. It is no longer extant, having been removed in 1940. Also at ground level are a pair of plaques containing the family's name and coat of arms.

The rest of the ground story contains storefront windows with ornamental iron frames, separated by projecting green-marble piers. The bottom edges of the storefront windows are built very close to the sidewalks, to increase visibility of objects inside, and are placed on ornamental iron sills. The windows were covered by overhanging awnings. Behind the storefront windows were display areas with mirrored side walls and mahogany rear walls. Other decorative details on the facade include a nameplate denoting the Van Allen family, and the family crest.

==== Upper stories ====
The upper facade uses over half a million bricks, which are mottled and vary in color because of the presence of mineral spots, which create imperfections. The brick is variously described as being soft brown, sandy, grayish brown, or gray with a purple tint. The tone is characterized as evoking the sediment on the Mississippi River's banks or the color of Iowa's soil. The brickwork of the upper stories is smooth, and the joints between different bricks are flush, except in piers separating each window. This specific type of brick was made locally by the Price Brick Yard; it was not reused in Sullivan's other work, though similar bricks were used in the nearby Orpheum Theatre. There are steel columns behind all of the piers, except the southernmost pier on the eastern elevation, which was included solely for esthetic purposes.

The southern elevation has three slender mullions, which are made of terracotta and rise three stories. The mullions protrude from the facade, similarly to the extruded I-beams of Ludwig Mies van der Rohe's mid-20th-century work. The presence of the mullions was variously cited as creating a monumental feeling, concealing the asymmetrical bays, accenting the building's height, or drawing attention to the use of long-span girders inside. The bottoms of each mullion rest on corbels containing inscriptions that read "VA", the initials of the Van Allen family. Atop the mullions are medallions with foliate ornament, including green corbels and finials. The color of the ornament was intended to evoke leaves and branches. Behind the medallions are blue-and-white tiled panels. The panels, a purely esthetic element, allude to the Dutch heritage of Van Allen. Drawings show that, had the building been expanded to seven stories, the exterior mullions may also have been extended. The Second Street elevation does not contain mullions.

Both the southern and eastern elevations have six windows on each floor, rather than conforming to the three-by-five-bay interior layout. The mullions and piers divide the southern windows in a 1-2-2-1 pattern, creating what the historians William Jordy and William Pierson Jr. described as "ambiguity of the fenestration". The eastern elevation's windows are divided only by the piers. Sullivan de-emphasized the windows themselves from the design, a contrast to the Carson's building, where the windows were accented. Each window opening on the upper stories consists of a large plate-glass pane, with a smaller sash window next to it. On the southern elevation, the sash windows are placed next to the nearest mullions. The large windows allowed views of the Mississippi River from inside, and their width was intended to allude to the use of a steel frame inside.

Horizontal terracotta courses run beneath and above each window, respectively connecting the windowsills and lintels of each story's windows. Unlike the brick, the terracotta is not mottled, though it does have a brown tint. Different designs were used for the courses above the first story; the lintels above the second, third, and fourth stories; and the frieze just below the top of the roof's parapet. The roofline, 64 3/4 feet (19.7 m) above street level, has a slight, protruding cornice.

=== Structural and mechanical features ===
The columns are spaced 28 feet (8.5 m) apart, roughly corresponding to the three bays on the southern elevation, and are connected by long-span girders running east–west. Sullivan contemplated using intermediate columns on the upper floors, but structural engineers Ritter & Mott advised him that the long girders could be used on all floors. The beams themselves are encased in concrete. Timber joists, which were intended to burn at a slower rate during fires, were installed under the hardwood floor, connecting the primary steel girders. An elevator and stairs, connecting the four above-ground stories, were placed on the northern side of the building. Two stairs descended to the basement. Sullivan left provisions for a second elevator shaft in case additional stories were built.

To reduce the risk of fire, Sullivan used self-closing fire doors for stairways. Red exit sign lamps were lit with electricity and gas, an innovation for the time. There were also sprinklers on the ceiling, supplied by a water tank on the roof. The basement had two boilers, along with a coal room and an ash room. The basement also contained a pneumatic tube system for cashiers. A forced-air system cleaned and heated air, which was pumped through the first floor and basement; the system could completely refresh the air in the basement within eight minutes, and on the upper floors within fifteen minutes. The air filtration system was similar to that used in Sullivan's jewel box banks, such as the People's Federal Savings and Loan Association (1918) in Sidney, Ohio. On upper stories, there was originally no mechanical ventilation, and breezes instead came in through the windows. Utility pipes and electric ducts were bundled within a single shaft, and drinking fountains were added on each floor. The basement also had a pump system that could be used during floods.

=== Interior ===
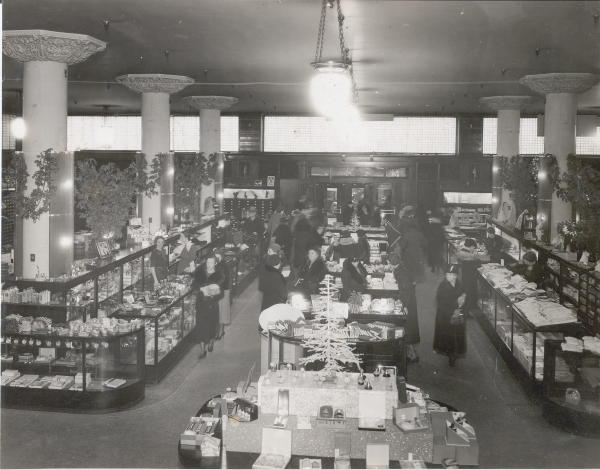
The first-floor interior

Inside, the building spans 45,000 square feet (4,200 m^{2}); including basement spaces, it covers more than 50,000 square feet (4,600 m^{2}). The interior originally had mahogany woodwork and illuminated display cabinets. The arrangement of the departments dictated the interior layout, with the most profitable departments clustered on the ground floor, which had the highest ceiling. The ground floor was originally for general dry goods and menswear, including a haberdashery with its own entrance. A delivery room was at the rear. There are six columns on the first story, topped by elaborate plaster decorations. Prismatic-glass clerestory windows surrounded the ground story. Within the basement, there was an arcade of glass display cases.

On the upper stories, the floors are made of wood. The ceilings are made of plaster applied onto lath and cloth, and the girders protrude into the surface of the ceiling. The large exterior windows illuminate the interior spaces and allow observers outside to see the girders on the ceiling. The mezzanine-level balcony, containing a curved glass railing, had toilets, telephones, parlors, and drinking fountains. The main portion of the second floor was originally intended for womenswear and had natural oak furnishings and a terrazzo floor. The third floor was for millinery, bedding, wallpaper, drapery, and arts departments, and the fourth floor was initially reserved for future expansion. Both the third and fourth stories had oak floors. The rear annex had stockrooms, workrooms, and employee lockers and toilets on the second through fourth floors.

By the 1970s, the interior had been significantly modified to accommodate modern selling patterns. After the building became an apartment building in the 2000s, it was divided into 5 two-bedroom and 14 one-bedroom units on the second through fourth stories. Two of the single-bedroom apartments span two stories. The first floor contains 6,000 square feet (560 m^{2}) of retail space. The interior was also renovated to incorporate a three-story atrium lit by a skylight.

== History ==
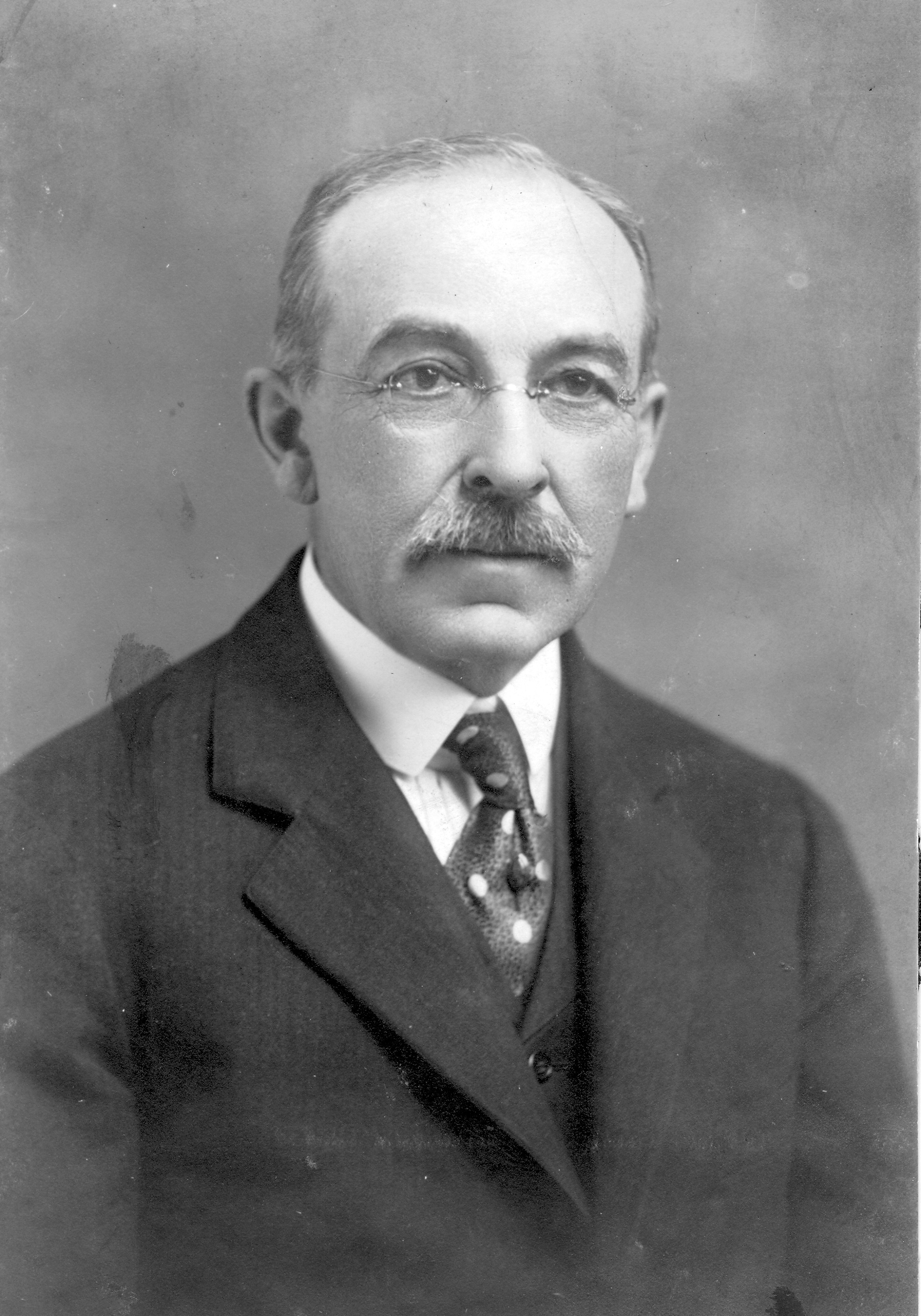
John Delbert Van Allen, who founded the store that originally occupied the building

John Delbert Van Allen was a businessman who first worked for Field, Leiter & Company in Chicago, then A. T. Stewart Company and Morrison & Harriman in New York City. He worked in his employer's Chicago office from 1871 onward. In 1892, Van Allen and his family moved to Clinton, about 140 miles (230 km) west of Chicago. Van Allen became a business partner in a 2,500-square-foot (230 m^{2}) dry-goods store at Second Street and Fifth Avenue South. The store acquired additional space in 1893 and 1897. The firm was renamed Van Allen & Son in 1905, upon which it expanded again to 11,000 square feet (1,000 m^{2}). The store's inventory expanded in the late 1900s to encompass a variety of clothing styles, and by 1908 the store was earning about $300,000 annually. (Note: Equivalent to $7.6 million in 2025) At the end of the next year, Van Allen bought the store's site.

=== Development ===
==== Planning ====
Van Allen was ready to build a new store by September 1910. By then, the Peoples Savings Bank in Cedar Rapids, Iowa, was under construction; Frederick Shaver, the bank's president, recommended that Van Allen hire Sullivan to design the new building. In a letter to Van Allen dated September 20, 1910, Shaver mentioned Sullivan's Transportation Building at the 1893 World Columbian Exposition, the Auditorium Hotel, and the Carson's building in Chicago, along with National Farmer's Bank of Owatonna, Minnesota, and wrote that Sullivan "designs buildings of great merit, beauty and simplicity". Sullivan invited Van Allen to Chicago to see the Carson's building the next month, though Van Allen's grandson, John B. Van Allen, later recalled that his grandfather may have already been aware of Sullivan's Chicago work, especially the Carson's building.

The early evolution of the building plans is detailed in a series of letters exchanged between Sullivan and Van Allen; the Art Institute of Chicago has collected 110 letters from Sullivan and 7 letters from Van Allen on the topic. By March 1911, Van Allen had formally offered the job to Sullivan, and on March 23 of that year, Sullivan sent the entrepreneur a rough sketch of the new store's first floor. The Van Allen site included a section that extended north from the lot's northwestern corner. To take advantage of this northern extension, Sullivan placed the entrance on the south, facing Fifth Avenue, and divided the floor plan into four north–south aisles. The aisles were 21 feet (6.4 m) wide, which Van Allen believed was too narrow, so Sullivan prepared revised plans for a three-aisle layout at Van Allen's request. Sullivan's draftsman Homer Sailor assisted with the drawings. In January 1912, Sullivan sent Van Allen revised plans for "a simple quiet building; yet with an air of distinction that comes from knowing how to do it". These plans called for a building with metal-trimmed openings; a light terracotta facade (used at Van Allen's request); and open-plan interiors.

To save money, Van Allen proposed sharing a party wall with a neighboring Woolworth store building to the west; this plan was too complex to actually implement, and the two businesses ultimately built separate party walls. Sullivan and Van Allen also discussed using light-colored brick rather than terracotta; they ultimately decided on darker brick. On April 3, 1912, Sullivan wrote to Van Allen stating, "My feeling is moving away from white enamelled terra cotta into a conception of brick and terra cotta in soft low tones." Plans for the Van Allen Building were filed that month, at which point it was expected to cost $100,000. (Note: Equivalent to $2.4 million in 2025) In August 1912, the Van Allen firm acquired the nearby Reid-Dewitt building as a temporary store location. By then, plans had been drawn up for a brick structure with stone trim. The following month, Van Allen moved to the temporary store, allowing the existing site to be cleared. Material and design specifications continued to be tweaked through late 1912, at which point Van Allen was impatient to start construction.

==== Construction ====
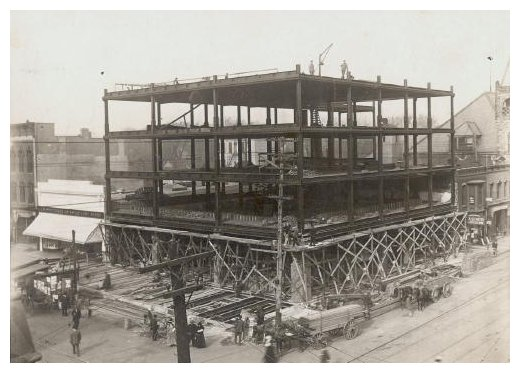
Construction progress in 1913

A local resident, Dan Haring, was hired as the structure's general contractor. The Price Brick Yard was the brick contractor, and Clinton Bridge Works was the steel contractor. Workers discovered quicksand while excavating test pits into the site. According to one account, after this happened, Sullivan would sit on a keg of nails across the street and direct work on the building when it was under construction. Excavation work began on May 1, 1913, and attracted many passersby. By mid-May, the excavation work was nearly completed, and foundations were being installed.

Haring began work on the superstructure immediately after the site had been cleared. The initial delivery of steelwork was sufficient for the first and second stories, though steel deliveries were delayed until late August and early September. Two derricks were installed to erect the beams. The steel frame had progressed to the top of the first floor by September 26 and the third floor by October 17. The steelwork was completed by November 14, followed by the walls, which were completed by December 20. The scaffolding was removed in May 1914, and the public saw the facade for the first time. That September, the Van Allen firm acquired Frank Moses's decorative arts firm.

=== Use as department store ===
==== Van Allen Department Store ====
The new Van Allen Building formally opened the week of September 29, 1914, and was completed in early 1915. It was, at the time, the only multi-story store in Clinton. Sources disagree on whether the building remained within its $100,000 budget or whether its budget had increased to $126,226. (Note: Equivalent to $3.0 million in 2025) When the store opened, it hosted weekly musical performances. During World War I, the American Red Cross moved into the first floor. The Red Cross facility opened in February 1917 and outgrew its space within a month; by the end of the year, two rooms were set aside for hospital supplies and surgical dressing. The fourth floor also had Red Cross workrooms. By the early 1920s, the store had a mail order department, and it employed a personal shopper. Advertising campaigns in local newspapers attracted customers from across rural Iowa.

A millinery department was added in 1924 as part of a renovation. In 1926, the firm opened 8,000 square feet (740 m^{2}) of sales space in the basement, with separate family, children's, ready-to-wear, outdoor, and domestic goods departments. The Folwell Crockery company also moved into the building. The next year, Van Allen & Son announced that it would add several departments to the second floor, while the third floor would become a women's ready-to-wear department. This work was completed by 1928; the fourth floor had a wallpaper department, in addition to the second- and third-story departments. After Van Allen died in 1929, his family continued operating the store, and they announced plans the next year to expand the business into additional departments. Although the store began operating one fewer day per week in the 1930s, business remained steady. During the Christmas and holiday season, Van Allen & Son decorated the store elaborately, with a Santa replica and a Christmas star.

In 1940, the company remodeled the building's Second Street display windows and removed the private haberdashery entrance. Van Allen & Son also rebuilt the entrance vestibules and added an elevator. Business at the store prospered during World War II, despite downturns elsewhere. John D. Van Allen's son, Fred, operated the store until his own death in 1953; his son John B. took over as the store's president. Over the years, maintenance became more difficult because Sullivan had chosen different materials for each of his Iowa buildings, many of which were no longer widely used by the late 20th century. For example, a fire damaged the facade in 1958, after which Van Allen & Son had to reuse bricks from one of the side elevations.

==== Petersen's store ====
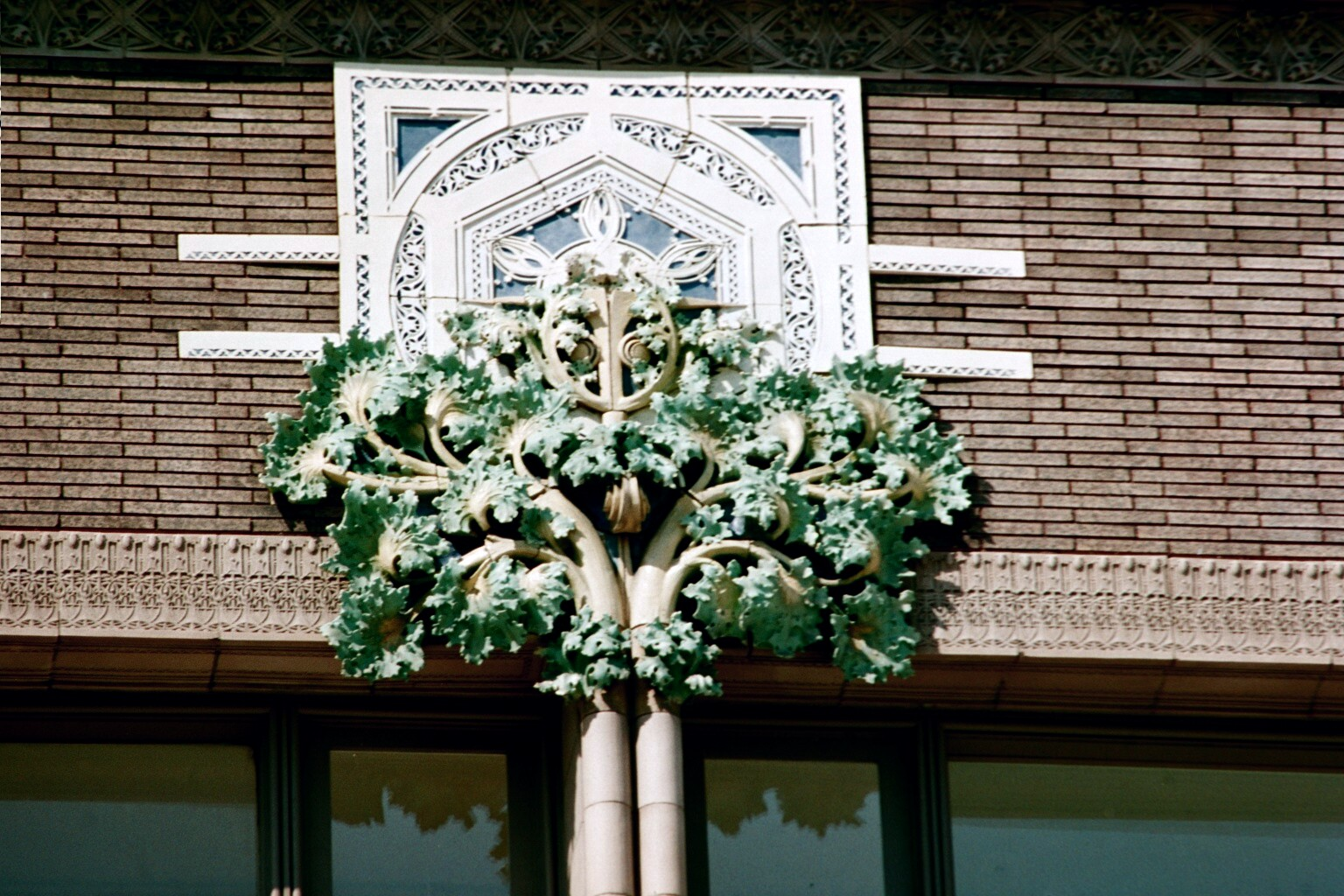
An elaborate capital atop the mullions

Petersen-Harned-Von Maur, a department store in Davenport, Iowa, acquired the Van Allen company in 1968; this was Petersen's first branch store outside its flagship in Davenport. At the time, the Van Allen Building employed 100 people, who continued to be employed by Petersen's. The building continued to be owned by John B. Van Allen, who leased it to Petersen's. John B. became the store's manager, and the building retained the Van Allen name, though Petersen's considered renovating the structure after acquiring the store. Phil Feddersen, a local architect, renovated the building in 1976. This work included adding glass-and-mahogany doors, and replacing the original upper-story windows with bronze-tinted windows.

The Van Allen Building was designated as a National Historic Landmark (NHL) in January 1976, in large part because it was one of the best-preserved surviving examples of Sullivan's later work. The landmark designation was announced before John Van Allen had had the chance to review the official nomination form, but both Van Allen and Petersen's officials supported the designation. It was one of 14 NHLs in Iowa at the time, and it was also one of several buildings by Sullivan (either alone or as part of Adler & Sullivan) to be granted NHL designation. (Note: Adler & Sullivan's Auditorium Building, Wainwright Building, Guaranty Building, and James Charnley House are also designated as NHLs. National Historic Landmarks designed by Sullivan alone include the Carson Pirie Scott Building, Bayard–Condict Building, Harold C. Bradley House, Farmers and Merchants Union Bank, Merchants' National Bank, National Farmers' Bank of Owatonna, and People's Federal Savings and Loan Association.) The designation made the building eligible for federal matching funds for preservation, as well as tax credits and some demolition protections.

Petersen's operated the store until it announced in March 1987 that the Clinton store would close; at the time, the company wished to focus on operating single-level stores. At that point, the store had only 50 employees, and the company had shuttered all of its downtown locations in other cities. This was part of a trend where large department stores across the US were moving away from downtowns into shopping malls. Petersen's listed the Van Allen Building for sale that April at about $250,000, and it began contacting department stores nationwide to gauge their interest in the building. The Van Allen Building closed on May 2, 1987, and the building then sat unused. Local merchants expressed concerns that the closure would negatively impact business in downtown Clinton. Van Allen wished to sell the building, but did not exclude the possibility of demolishing it; as one city councilman later said, such a demolition might have led to the destruction of other buildings in downtown Clinton.

=== Later usage ===
==== Initial renovation ====
Crombie Taylor, a retired University of Southern California dean, led efforts to restore the building; he had previously renovated some of Sullivan's other designs. After learning in early 1988 that the structure had been vacant for a year, Taylor moved to Clinton and formed the Van Allen Foundation to help save the structure. The foundation sought to convert the building into a museum and cultural center, with exhibits about Sullivan's work at ground level and offices for historical organizations on the upper floors. The architect Gyo Obata became chairman of the foundation's board, and the architect John Vinci also joined the restoration effort. The Van Allen Foundation turned on the heat to prevent the building from decaying further, and it obtained an option to buy the building in 1989.

The foundation received an $80,000 state grant in March 1990 to help purchase the building, and it appointed a steering committee the next month to raise money for restoration. The Clinton City Council purchased the Van Allen Building for $250,000 that May. The building was then leased to the Van Allen Foundation for 25 years. At the time, the terracotta alone was valued at $750,000, far higher than the purchase price. After the city purchased the building, the Van Allen Foundation renovated the ground floor and repainted exterior decorations. The project was funded by $105,000 from the Iowa government and $200,000 in private donations; the Clinton County government also provided an $8,000 grant. Taylor invited preservationists and architects to visit Clinton and convince community groups to use the structure, and the foundation allowed donors to sponsor 1-square-foot (0.093 m^{2}) increments of the building.

The ground floor reopened on October 6, 1991. Initially, the ground floor had a photography exhibit on Sullivan's work and another exhibit about the building's history, and some space was rented out for public use. Later that year, the foundation requested another $25,000 from the city for repairs. Taylor believed that the building, once fully restored, would become a visitor attraction in a similar fashion to the Frank Lloyd Wright Home and Studio in Oak Park, Illinois. He anticipated raising money through merchandise sales. The foundation recorded 5,000 visitors in its first five months of the building's reopening. The town's mayor at the time said that Taylor had "tugged and pulled and charmed our citizens into a cadre of strong supporters".

==== Search for an alternate use ====
The Van Allen Foundation sought another $250,000–500,000 to renovate the upper floors, and it wished to restore the store's original appearance. It enlisted college students for the restoration process. Taylor, who wanted to preserve the Van Allen Building as an architectural history center, denied many requests to host activities there, which slowly led to community members avoiding it; he resigned as the foundation's director in 1993. The foundation struggled to fundraise, and after its expenses began to surpass income, the foundation's director Indra Brewer agreed to stop taking a salary in 1994. The next year, the Van Allen Foundation began interviewing cultural groups within 50 miles (80 km) of Clinton to gauge their interest in using the building. The foundation also hired a consultant to consider alternate uses for the building. In late 1995, the city council voted against either selling the structure or appointing a task force to discuss the building's future uses, though Clinton mayor Darrell Smith did eventually appoint a task force.

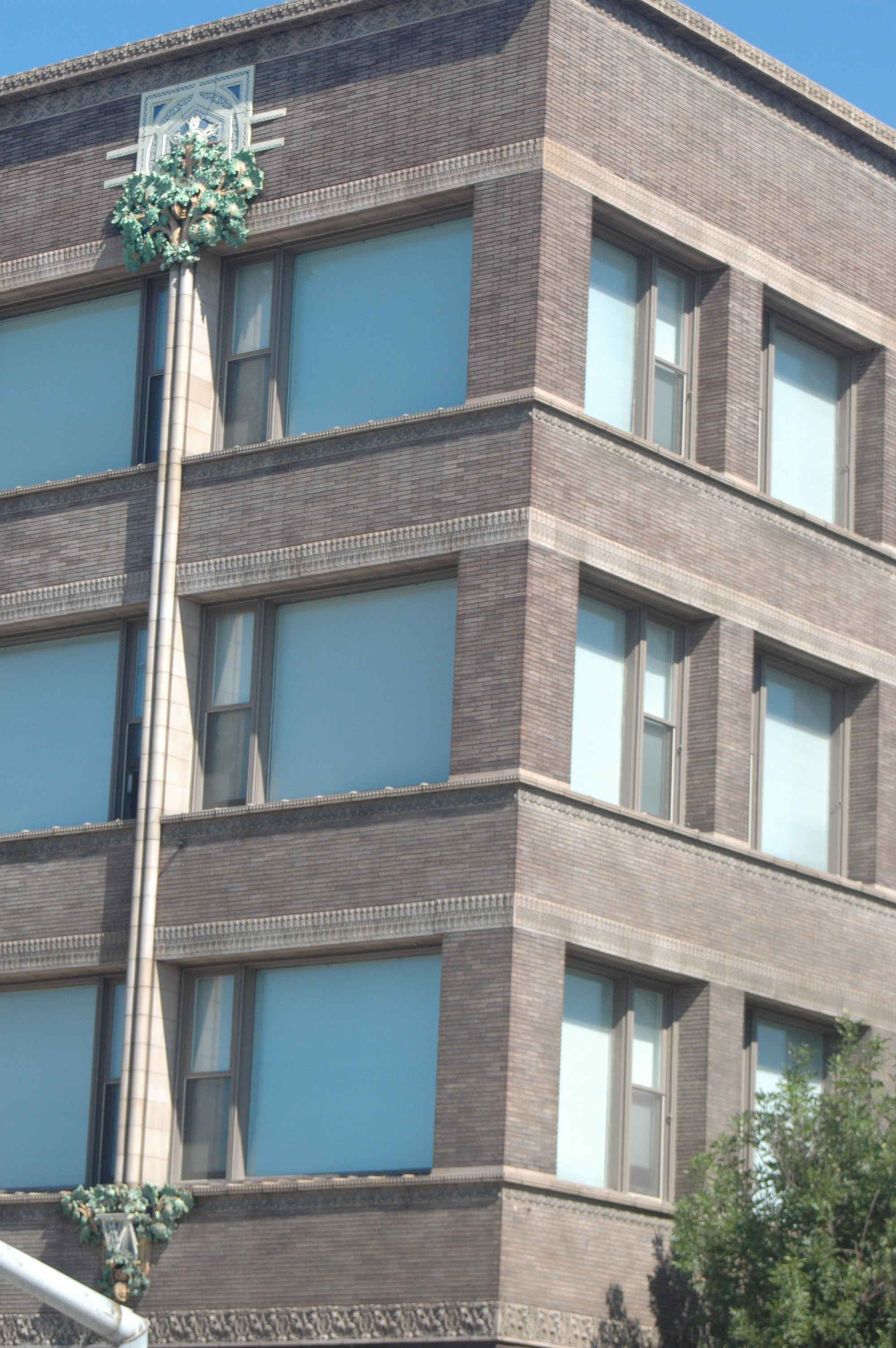
Southeast corner detail

The attempts to reuse the building had stalled by 1996 after proposals to convert it into a theater, an art center, or a museum all failed. Exacerbating the Van Allen Foundation's financial issues, a boiler malfunction that February caused a water pipe leak that damaged large parts of the building. Following the pipe burst, the Van Allen Task Force requested that the city council allocate $99,000 for repairs. At the time, the history museum was closed, but the building still hosted events such as an antique market, a car show, auctions, and theatrical performances. There were also proposals to convert the building into an aerospace museum or a Clinton School Board office. Due to continued financial issues, the Van Allen Foundation moved out of the building in July 1996; all the utility services were shut off, though cursory inspections at the time did not reveal any structural issues. The Clinton City Council voted in January 1997 to place the building for sale.

The city council received three proposals in late 1997, which variously envisioned converting the building into a restaurant and entertainment center, a retail store, or low-income housing. The council did not endorse any of the proposals, instead soliciting more bids. In October 1999, Heartland Properties of Wisconsin and Community Housing Initiatives (CHI) of Iowa proposed converting the ground story into commercial office space and the upper stories into 19 apartments for about $2.1 million. The proposal was contingent on the city council's approval of a Self-Supported Municipal Improvement District allowing local businesses to fund improvements in downtown Clinton, which was approved later that month. The city council approved plans in November 1999 to resell the Van Allen Building to Heartland and CHI for a nominal fee of $1.

==== Conversion to apartments ====
After acquiring the Van Allen Building, the developers sought funding from local banks and the State Historical Society of Iowa, as well as from the state and federal governments. The city government and the developers agreed in late 2001 to demolish two adjacent buildings on Fifth Avenue South to create parking spaces for occupants. The city had pledged $300,000 to fully demolish three buildings, but the project was partially funded using federal preservation tax credits, which required that the adjacent structures' facades retain as much of their original appearances as possible. The city also granted $102,000 directly for the project, and the project received another $200,000 of federal funding from the Save America's Treasures program. The project also obtained a Low-Income Housing Tax Credit worth over $114,000 a year. Other grants funded smaller project components such as accessible restrooms and a computer center. Governor Tom Vilsack toured the building in October 2002, when the renovation was nearly completed.

The renovation was completed in May 2003, and the ground-floor retail space was leased to a pharmacy. Two of the apartments were rented at market rate, while the other 17 apartments were reserved as affordable housing. The historian Molly Myers Naumann cited the Van Allen Building's conversion, along with the Mason City YMCA's concurrent apartment conversion, as an example of adaptive reuse of historically significant buildings in Iowa. Following the Van Allen Building's renovation, CHI converted several other nearby structures into housing. The building itself housed a variety of families, professionals, and elderly residents, and it attracted visitors from as far away as Japan, Italy, Sweden, and the Netherlands. It remained an apartment building in the 2020s.

== Reception ==
When the building was completed, the Clinton Herald wrote that "like an Aladdin's fairy place, the wonderful four-story building rears itself..." In 1970, the Quad-City Times of Davenport, Iowa, wrote that "the original beauty of the structure remains" and that the uncluttered horizontal and vertical lines belied the attention given to details such as the structure's proportions and the facade's colorful tiles. A writer for The Des Moines Register said in 1982 that Sullivan's name was "in the very fabric of the building" and did not need to be mentioned for it to be recognizable. The architectural historian David van Zanten wrote in 2002 that the Van Allen Building was one of the "smaller projects in less traveled places" that made up most of Sullivan's 20th-century work, contrasting with his earlier large commissions such as the Wainwright Building, Auditorium Building, or Guaranty Building. A writer for the Star Tribune, in 2018, called the Van Allen Building a "reminder of the gems to be found if you keep your eyes and mind open while wandering through Iowa".

The historian Joseph Siry wrote that the vertical mullions on the southern facade were frequently criticized because they did not serve a structural purpose. Among the people who held this view was one of Sullivan's biographers, Hugh Morrison. Another biographer, Robert Twombly, said the building "would have been better without the heavy ornament, and its potential crispness even sharper without horizontal articulation". Narciso Menocal, a third biographer, wrote that the overall design was "at best picturesque" rather than imposing. Menocal believed the decorative program was incomplete, a view shared by the historians William Jordy and William Pierson Jr.. By contrast, Blair Kamin of the Chicago Tribune likened the terracotta details to brooches and said it created an illusion of symmetry. Twombly, Jordy, and Pierson all praised the originality of the design, despite their qualms about the decorative elements. Siry wrote that the building was "unique among Sullivan's works", coming at a time when Sullivan was transitioning from high-rise designs to smaller commercial work.

== See also ==
- List of National Historic Landmarks in Iowa
- National Register of Historic Places listings in Clinton County, Iowa
