= Alin, Iran =

Alin علين
- Village
- Location within Iran
- Coordinates: 36°28′03″N 50°11′21″E
- Country: Iran
- Province: Qazvin
- County: Qazvin
- Bakhsh: Alamut-e Gharbi
- Rural district: Rudbar-e Shahrestan

Population (2006)
  - Total: 18
- Time zone: UTC+3:30 (IRST)
  - Summer (DST): UTC+4:30 (IRDT)

Alin (Persian: علين, also Romanized as Al'īn) is a village in Rudbar-e Shahrestan Rural District, Alamut-e Gharbi District, Qazvin County, Qazvin Province, Iran. At the 2006 census, its population was 18, in 5 families.
