= Alun Anderson =

British writer (born 1948)

- Born: Alun Mark Anderson; 27 May 1948 (age 78); North Wales
- Education: University of Sussex (BSc); University of Edinburgh (PhD); University of Oxford (IBM Research Fellow); University of Kyoto (Royal Society Overseas Fellow)
- Known for: Writing and editing for several popular science magazines: Nature; Science; New Scientist (editor)
- Awards: Editor of the Year (1993, 1995, 1997), British Society of Magazine Editors
- Scientific career
- Fields: Biology, Science journalism
- Thesis: Some Aspects of Learning in Insects (1972)

Alun Mark Anderson (born 27 May 1948) is a Welsh scientist and science journalist. He is best known as the editor in chief and publishing director of New Scientist from 1992 to 2005. He continues to act as a consultant for the magazine. In 2009 he published After the Ice: Life, Death, and Geopolitics in the New Arctic, about the effects of climate change on the wildlife and native peoples of the arctic region.

A 2003 interview at the University of Sussex is the likely inspiration for Richard Dawkins' famous quote "Science is interesting and if you don't agree you can fuck off".
