= Van Alen Building =

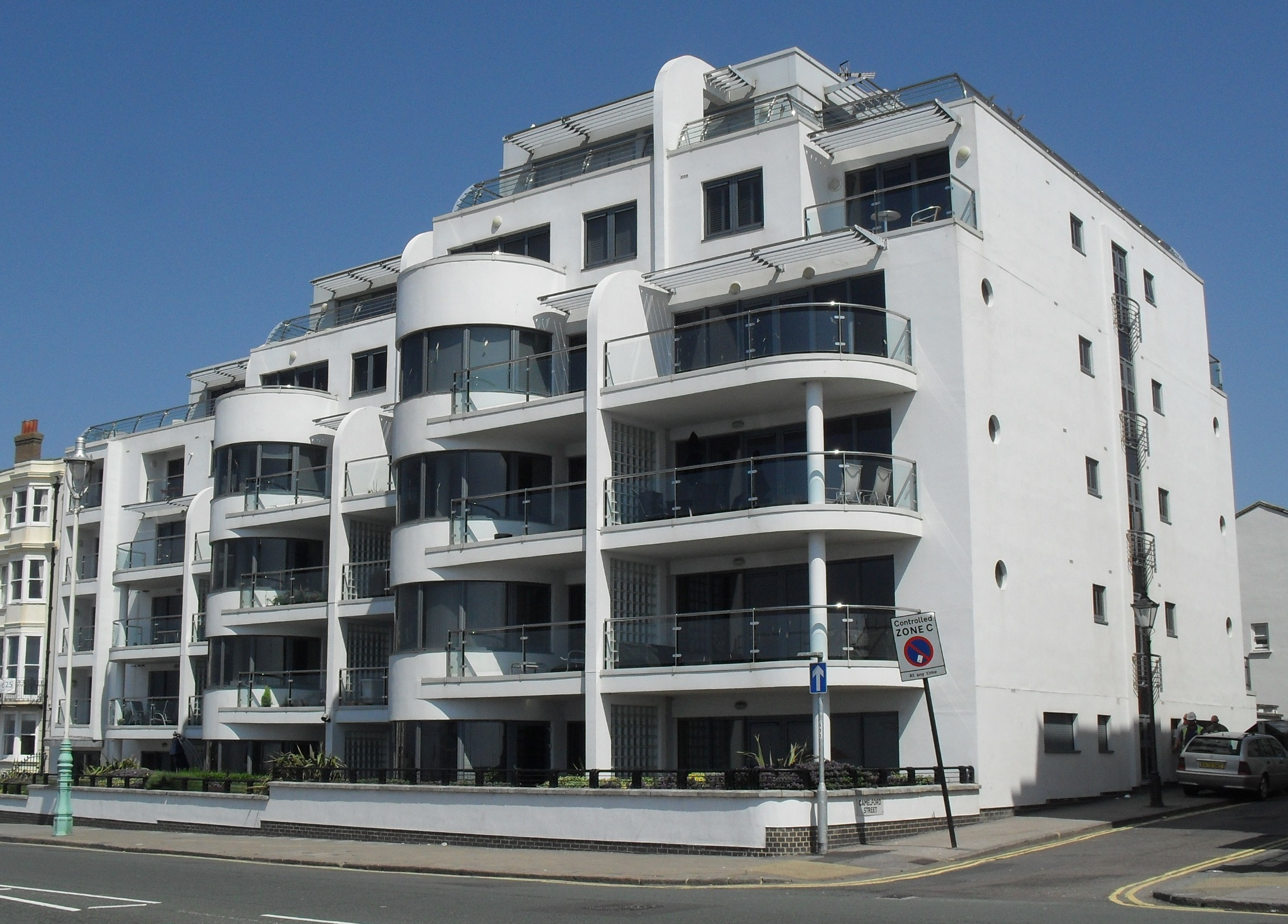
- The building from the southeast

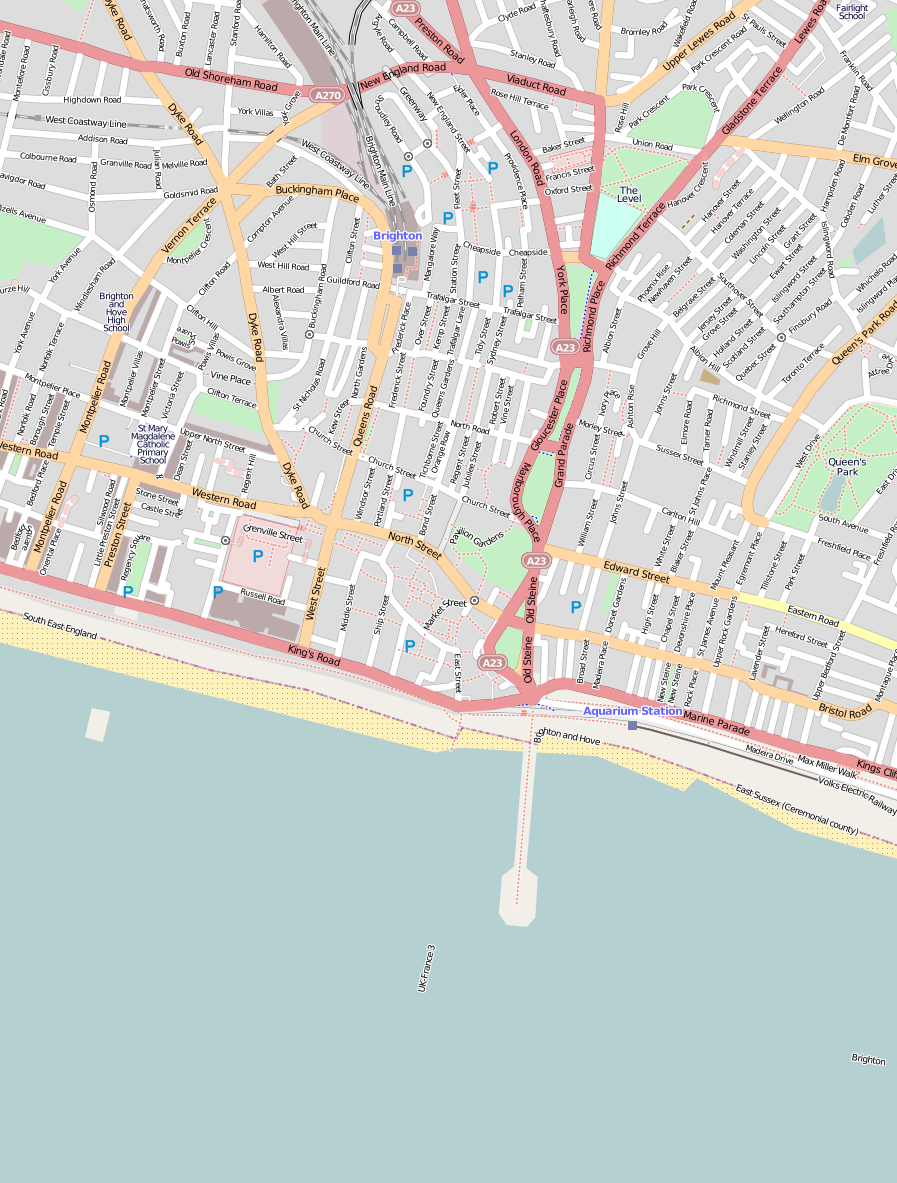
- Location within Brighton

General information
- Type: Residential apartment block
- Architectural style: Neo-Art Deco/Streamline Moderne
- Location: Brighton and Hove, 24–30 Marine Parade, BN2 1WP, Brighton, England
- Coordinates: 50.8199°N 0.1334°W
- Construction started: 1999
- Completed: 2001

Design and construction
- Architect: Peter Rutter
- Architecture firm: PRC Fewster
- Main contractor: Berkeley Homes
- Awards: 2002: Britannia National HomeBuilder Design Awards (Commendation)

The Van Alen Building is a modern apartment and penthouse block on the seafront in Brighton, part of the English city of Brighton and Hove. It was named after William Van Alen, the architect of New York City's Chrysler Building and is designed as a 21st-century interpretation of the Art Deco and Streamline Moderne styles. It was completed in 2001.

== History ==
Residential development along the north side of Marine Parade, a wide road leading eastwards along Brighton seafront across the top of East Cliff, began in about 1790 at the west end (nearest the old fishing village of Brighthelmston—the ancient heart of the city). The houses were large, well-appointed and benefited from superb direct sea views, so the area immediately became one of the highest-class areas of the growing town; in the 21st century it has been described as "the country's most impressive marine façade". Most of the area is protected by one of the 34 conservation areas in the city, and features one of its best and most consistent sets of Regency architecture.

One plot of land towards the western end was marred by a derelict petrol station for many years. In the late 1990s, housebuilder Berkeley Group Holdings, under its Berkeley Homes brand, bought the brownfield site and sought to redevelop it with a high-density residential development. Its proposal was an apartment block with two- and three-bedroom flats, all with balconies and sea views and served by an underground car park. Because the prominent site was so visually sensitive—on a main road into and out of Brighton and surrounded by high-quality, architecturally harmonious stuccoed buildings of moderate height—the company and their chosen architect had to present their plans to several parties. Brighton and Hove Borough (later City) Council and two national government bodies, English Heritage and the Royal Fine Arts Commission (now the Commission for Architecture and the Built Environment), were involved.

Berkeley Homes chose the London-based architecture firm PRC Fewster to design the building; the project's architect was Peter Rutter. The agreed design was 38 sea-facing apartments including two penthouses and accommodation for a concierge. The council required provision to be made for affordable housing as part of the development, so six new terraced houses were built at the rear of the block as well. Work began in 1999, and the block was completed in 2001. It was named after William Van Alen—architect of the Art Deco Chrysler Building in Manhattan, New York City.

The 38 flats went on sale in late May 2000, and within hours most had been sold; by 3 June 2000, it was reported that only eight were still available—despite an 18-month wait for completion, prices of up to £500,000 and only an artist's drawing to refer to. The flats were aimed at the top end of the market, for buyers interested in investment and luxury, and were priced accordingly. Former member of the Spice Girls Emma Bunton bought one of the penthouses in 2001 for use as a weekend retreat; it was sold a year later for about £750,000.

In the early hours of 11 August 2003, one of the penthouse flats was destroyed by fire. Firefighters spent five hours tackling flames which reached a height of 50 feet (15 m). The flat was unoccupied at the time. Confused as to how the fire could have started—it worked its way into the flat from the wooden-floored balcony—fire investigators announced that a seagull may have picked up a smouldering cigarette in its beak and dropped it on the balcony when it found it was not edible. Two other theories, considered less likely, were that during the day, the glass balcony magnified and focused the sun's rays on to the wooden decking, causing it to smoulder and eventually catch fire; or that a firework lit on the beach flew on to the decking. The flat's market value at the time was about £750,000.

== Architecture ==
The Van Alen Building consists of three linked blocks of equal width, of which the westernmost is recessed significantly from Marine Parade. The centre bay is set further forwards but still recessed, and the easternmost (corner) bay fronts the road. Curved lines and surfaces are used throughout; the building thereby represents a 21st-century interpretation of the Art Deco and Streamline Moderne styles which were popular themes in seaside resort architecture in the 1930s. In Brighton, this tradition was represented by the Embassy Court development of 1934–36 by Modernist architect Wells Coates—one of the city's most innovative and iconic modern buildings—and the Van Alen Building has been compared to it. The overall design has been praised as innovative by Brighton & Hove City Council and within the building industry. Local conservationists have also given their approval.

The white-painted façade has some nautical-themed windows in the style of portholes, long horizontal glazed areas facing the sea, and fully glazed balconies. These were installed instead of the intended opaque balconies at the request of the heritage bodies consulted, and are connected by Modernist-style "fins".
