= Van Halen (disambiguation) =

Van Halen was an American rock band active between 1972 and 2020.

Van Halen or its variations may also refer to the following:

== Music ==
- Van Halen (album), by Van Halen, 1978
- Van Halen II, by Van Halen, 1979
- Van Halen III, by Van Halen, 1998
- "Van Halen", a 1996 song by Nerf Herder from Nerf Herder (album)

== Other uses ==
- Guitar Hero: Van Halen, a 2009 Guitar Hero video game based Van Halen's music

== See also ==
- The dictionary definition of van stal halen at Wiktionary
- Halen
- Van (disambiguation)
