= Alén (name) =

Alén is both a given name and a surname. Notable people of the name include the following:

== Surname ==
- Alberto Alén Pérez (1948–2004), Cuban musicologist
- Juha Alén (born 1981), Finnish ice hockey player
- Markku Alén (born 1951), Finnish racing driver

== Given name ==
- Alén Diviš (1900–1956), Czech artist

== See also ==
- Alen (given name)
- Alen baronets
- Van Alen
