= List of people with given name Alan =

This is a list of notable people with the given name Alan:

== A ==
- Alan Abel (1924–2018), American hoaxer
- Alan Acosta (born 1996), Mexican footballer
- Alan Agayev (born 1977), Russian footballer
- Alan Aguerre (born 1990), Argentine footballer
- Alan Aguirre (born 1993), Argentine footballer
- Alan Alda (born 1936), American actor
- Alan Aldridge (1938–2017), British artist
- Alan Alegre (born 1991), Argentine footballer
- Alan Ameche (1933–1988), American football player
- Alan Amos (born 1952), British politician
- Alan Anderson, multiple people
- Alan Arario (born 1995), Argentine footballer
- Alan Archibald (born 1977), Scottish football player and manager
- Alan Arkin (1934–2023), American actor
- Alan Ashby (born 1951), American baseball player and sports commentator
- Alan Autry (born 1952), American actor and politician
- Alan Ayckbourn (born 1939), British playwright

== B ==
- Alan Bagayev (born 1991), Russian footballer
- Alan Bahia (born 1983), Brazilian footballer
- Alan Ball, multiple people
- Alan Bannister (born 1951), American baseball player
- Alan Barkun, Canadian gastroenterologist
- Alan Baró (born 1985), Spanish footballer
- Alan Basset, English baron
- Alan Bates (1934–2003), British actor
- Alan J. Bauman, American hair transplant surgeon
- Alan Baxter, multiple people
- Alan Bean (1932–2018), fourth person to walk on the Moon
- Alan Becker (animator) (born 1989), American animator and YouTube personality
- Alan Benes (born 1972), American baseball pitcher
- Alan Benítez (born 1994), Paraguayan footballer
- Alan Bennett, multiple people
- Alan Bersin (born 1946), American lawyer
- Alan Bersten (born 1994), American dancer
- Alan Bidi (born 1995), Ivorian footballer
- Alan Blayney (born 1981), Irish goaltender and coach
- Alan Bonansea (born 1996), Argentine footballer
- Alan M. Bolle (born 1958), American artist
- Alan Bond (1938–2015), Australian businessman
- Alan Bonner (born 1990), American football player
- Alan Branch (born 1984), American football player
- Alan Branson (born 1951), American politician
- Alan Brazil (born 1959), Scottish footballer and broadcaster
- Alan Brice (1937–2016), American baseball pitcher
- Alan Brooke, 1st Viscount Alanbrooke (1883–1963), British Soldier
- Alan Brown (racing driver) (1919–2004), British racing driver
- Alan Brown (cricketer, born 1935) (1935–2026), English cricketer
- Alan Brown (Australian politician) (born 1946), Australian politician
- Alan Brown (cricketer, born 1957) (born 1957), English cricketer
- Alan Brown (footballer, born 1914) (1914–1996), English footballer
- Alan Brown (filmmaker), American director and author
- Alan Brown (cricketer, born 1933) (1933–2013), English cricketer
- Alan Brown (Scottish politician) (born 1970), Scottish National Party politician
- Alan Brown (British Army officer) (1909–1971), British Army officer
- Alan Brown (rugby union, born 1980), Scottish rugby union footballer and coach
- Alan Brown (footballer, born 1959), English footballer
- Alan Brown (footballer, born 1937) (1937–2016), English footballer
- Alan Brown (police officer), British police officer
- Alan Brown (rugby union, born 1911) (1911–1987), English rugby union player
- Alan A. Brown (1928–2010), Hungarian economist and academic
- Alan Grahame Brown (1913–1972), British politician
- Alan Browne (footballer) (born 1995), Irish footballer
- Alan Burton, multiple people
- Alan Busenitz (born 1990), American professional baseball pitcher
- Alan Bush (1900–1995), British composer and pianist
- Alan Byrne, multiple people
- Alan Byron (1936–1982), Australian rules football player

== C ==
- Alan Caldwell (born 1956), American football player
- Alan Calvert (1875–1944), American businessman
- Alan Campos (born 1973), American football player
- Alan Carr (born 1976), English comedian
- Alan Catello Grazioso, American filmmaker
- Alan Peter Cayetano (born 1970), Filipino politician
- Alan Clark (1928–1999), British MP amd author
- Alan Cline, American computer scientist
- Alan E. Cober (1935–1998), American illustrator
- Alan Cockrell (born 1962), American baseball player and coach
- Alan Collins, multiple people
- Alan Colmes (1950–2017), American radio and television host
- Alan Connell (born 1983), English footballer
- Alan Cranston (1914–2000), American politician and journalist
- Alan Cross (born 1993), American football player
- Alan Cumming (born 1965), Scottish-American actor
- Alan Curbishley (born 1957), English football player and manager
- Alan Curtis, multiple people

== D ==
- Alan Dale (born 1947), New Zealand-born Australian actor
- Alan Davies (born 1966), English comedian
- Alan Dedicoat (born 1954), English broadcaster
- Alan Dershowitz (born 1938), American lawyer and academic
- Alan Dukes (born 1945), Irish politician
- Alan Duncan (born 1957), British politician
- Alan Dye, American designer
- Alan Dzagoev (born 1990), Russian footballer

== E ==
- Alan Embree (born 1970), American baseball pitcher
- Alan Empereur (born 1994), Brazilian footballer
- Alan Erwin (1944–2019), American PR professional

== F ==
- Alan Faneca (born 1976), American football player
- Alan Foster, multiple people
- Alan Fowlkes (born 1958), American baseball pitcher
- Alan Freeman (1927–2006), British disc jockey
- Alan A. Freeman (1920–1985), English record producer

== G ==
- Alan García (1949–2019), Peruvian politician
- Alan Garner, multiple people
  - Alan Garner (born 1934), English novelist
- Alan Gemmell (1913–1986), Scottish biology professor
- Alan Gerber (born 1947), American singer-songwriter
- Alan Gerber, American political scientist
- Alan Gilzean (1938–2018), Scottish footballer
- Alan B. Gold (1917–2005), Canadian justice
- Alan Gow (born 1982), Scottish footballer
- Alan Grant, multiple people
- Alan Greenspan (1926–2026), American economist
- Alan Gross (born 1949), U.S. government contractor
- Alan Gurr (born 1982), Australian racing driver
- Alan Guth (born 1947), American theoretical physicist and cosmologist

== H ==
- Alan Hale, multiple people
- Alan Haller (born 1970), American football player
- Alan Hansen (born 1955), Scottish footballer and television pundit
- Alan Hardy, multiple people
- Alan Hargesheimer (born 1954), American baseball pitcher
- Alan Harper, multiple people
- Alan Haworth (ice hockey) (born 1960), Canadian ice hockey player
- Alan Henderson (1944–2017), Northern Irish bassist for the rock band Them
- Alan Henderson (born 1972), American basketball player
- Alan Hepple (born 1963), Canadian ice hockey player
- Alan Herron (born 2003), Jamaican football player
- Alan Hevesi (1940–2023), American politician
- Alan Hodgkin, English physiologist, biophysicist and Nobel laureate
- Alan Hovhaness (1911–2000), American composer
- Alan Howard, multiple people
- Alan Hutton (born 1984), Scottish footballer

== I ==
- Alan Ibrahimagić (born 1978), Bosnian basketball coach
- Alan Igbon (1952–2020), English actor
- Alan Igglesden (1964–2021), English cricketer
- Alan Iglitzin (1931–2025), American violist and Olympic Music Festival founder
- Alan Imlay (1885–1959), English cricketer
- George Alan Ingalls (1946–1967), United States Army Medal of Honor recipient
- Alan Inns (born 1945), British rower
- Alan Irvine (footballer, born 1958) (born 1958), Scottish football manager
- Alan Irvine (footballer, born 1962), Scottish footballer
- Alan Irwin (1889–1970), Australian rules footballer
- Alan Isaac (born 1952), NZ businessman, cricket administrator & former player
- Alan Isaacman (born 1942), American lawyer
- Gregory Alan Isakov (born 1979), South African musician
- Alan Isler (1934–2010), American novelist and professor

== J ==
- Alan Jackson (born 1958), American country singer
- Alan Jacobs (academic) (born 1958), American scholar
- Alan Jacobs (filmmaker), American film director
- Alan Jacobs, multiple people
- Alan Jacobson, American author
- Alan Jefferies (born 1957), Australian poet and children's writer
- Alan Johnson, multiple people
- Alan Johnston (born 1962), British journalist
- Alan Jones, multiple people
- Alan Judge, multiple people
- Alan Julian (born 1983), footballer

== K ==
- Alan Kardec (born 1989), Brazilian footballer
- Alan Kay (born 1940), American computer scientist
- Alan Keane, multiple people
- Alan Kelly, multiple people
- Alan Kerr (born 1964), Canadian ice hockey player
- Alan Khazei (born 1961), American social entrepreneur
- Alan King (1927–2004), American actor and comedian
- Alan Kirby (born 1977), Irish footballer
- Alan Knicely (born 1955), American baseball player
- Alan Koch, multiple people
- Alan Krashesky (born 1960), American journalist
- Alan Kulwicki (1954–1993), American auto racing driver
- Alan Kuntz (1919–1987), Canadian ice hockey player

== L ==
- Alan Ladd (1913–1964), American actor
- Alan Larson (born 1949), American diplomat
- Alan Lascelles (1887–1981), British courtier and civil servant
- Alan Lee, multiple people
- Alan Jay Lerner (1918–1986), American lyricist and librettist
- Alan Letang (born 1975), Canadian-Croatian ice hockey player
- Alan Licht (born 1968), American guitarist and composer
- Alan Lightman (born 1948), American physicist and writer
- Alan Ling (born 1983), Malaysian lawyer and politician
- Alan Longmuir (1948–2018), Scottish bassist

== M ==
- Alan McCormack (born 1984), Irish footballer
- Alan McLeod McCulloch (1907–1992), Australian art critic
- Alan MacDiarmid (1927–2007), New Zealand-born American chemist and Nobel laureate
- Alan May (born 1965), Canadian ice hockey player
- Alan McDonald, multiple people
- Alan Mcilwraith (born 1978), Scottish call centre worker who was exposed as a military impostor
- Alan McInally (born 1963), Scottish footballer
- Alan McLoughlin (1967–2021), footballer
- Alan McManus (born 1971), snooker player
- Alan McNicoll (1908–1987), officer in the Royal Australian Navy (RAN) and diplomat
- Alan Mangan, Irish footballer for Westmeath
- Alan Manning, British economist
- Alan Menken (born 1949), American composer and director
- Alan Miller, multiple people
- Alan Mills, multiple people
- Alan Alexander Milne (1882–1956), English author
- Alan Moorcroft, British philatelist
- Alan Moore (born 1953), English writer
- Alan Murphy, multiple people
- Alan Myers (drummer) (1954–2013), American drummer

== N ==
- Alan Napier (1903–1988), English actor
- Alan Navarro (born 1981), English footballer
- Alan Neilson (born 1972), Welsh footballer
- Alan Nelmes (born 1948), English footballer
- Alan Newman (baseball) (born 1969), American baseball pitcher
- Alan Nordling (born 1952), Canadian politician
- Alan Norris, multiple people
- Alan North (1920–2000), American actor
- Alan Nugawela (died 2007), Sri Lankan Sinhala army officer
- Alan Nunnelee (1958–2015), American businessman and politician

== O ==
- Alan Oakes (born 1942), English footballer
- Alan O'Brien (born 1985), Irish footballer
- Alan O'Connor (Gaelic footballer) (born 1985), Irish Gaelic footballer
- Alan O'Day (1940–2013), American singer-songwriter
- Alan O'Donoghue (1891–1959), Australian rules football player
- Alan Ogg (1967–2009), American basketball player
- Alan O'Hara (born 1983), Irish footballer
- Alan O'Hare (born 1982), Irish footballer
- Alan Old (born 1945), English rugby union player
- Alan Oldham (born 1963), American techno DJ
- Alan O'Leary (born 1962), Canadian curler
- Alan Oliver, British sports journalist
- Alan O'Neill, multiple people
- Alan Opie (born 1945), English baritone
- Alan Osmond (born 1949), American singer

== P ==
- Alan Page (born 1945), American jurist and football player
- Alan Pardew (born 1961), English football player and manager
- Alan Parker (1944–2020), English filmmaker
- Alan Parsons (badminton) (born 1940), South African badminton player
- Alan Parsons (born 1948), English audio engineer
- Alan Pastrana (1944–2021), American football player
- Alan Pearce (born 1965), English footballer
- Alan Perlis (1922–1990), American computer scientist and professor
- Alan Poindexter (1961–2012), American astronaut
- Alan Pollock (born 1962), English playwright and scriptwriter
- Alan Pringle (born 1952), American football player

== Q ==
- Alan Quaife (1945–2019), Australian rules football player
- Alan Quine (born 1993), Canadian ice hockey player
- Alan Quinlan (born 1974), Irish rugby union player
- Alan Quinlivan (1915–1965), Australian rugby league player
- Alan Quinn (born 1979), Irish footballer
- Alan Quirke (born 1976), Irish sportsman

== R ==
- Alan Rabinowitz (1953–2018), American zoologist
- Alan Randall (entertainer) (1934–2005), English musician
- Alan Rees, multiple people
- Alan Reid, multiple people
- Alan Resnick (born 1986), American comedian
- Alan Reuber (born 1981), American football player
- Alan Rickman (1946–2016), English actor
- Alan Ricard (born 1977), American football player and coach
- Alan Risher (born 1961), American football player
- Alan Ritchson (born 1982), American actor
- Alan Rittinger (1925–2017), Canadian ice hockey player
- Alan Rogers, multiple people
- Alan Rollinson (1943–2019), British racing driver
- Alan Rosen (restaurant owner) (born 1969), American restaurant and bakery owner

== S ==
- Alan Shearer (born 1970), English footballer
- Alan Shepard (1923–1998), American astronaut
- Alan Sawyer (1928–2012), American basketball player
- Alan Seiden (1937–2008), American collegiate and basketball player
- Alan Smith, multiple people
- Alan Stacey (1933–1960), British racing driver
- Alan Chen Stokes, American internet celebrity
- Alan Storke (1884–1910), American baseball player
- Alan Strange (1906–1994), American baseball player and manager
- Alan Sugar (born 1947), British businessman

== T ==
- Alan Tam (born 1950), Hong Kong singer and actor
- Alan Taylor, multiple people
- Alan Thicke (1947–2016), Canadian actor
- Alan Thomas, multiple people
- Alan Titchmarsh (born 1949), British broadcaster, gardener, and novelist
- Alan Trammell (born 1958), American baseball player, manager, and coach
- Alan Trejo (born 1996), American baseball player
- Alan Tudyk (born 1971), American actor
- Alan Turing (1912–1954), English mathematician

== U ==
- Alan Unwin (1941 or 1942–2024), Canadian politician
- Alan Ure (1892–1970), English football manager
- Alan Uryga (born 1994), Polish footballer

== V ==
- Alan van der Merwe (born 1980), South African racing driver
- Alan Vaughan-Richards (1925–1989), British-Nigerian architect
- Alan Veingrad (born 1963), American football player and public speaker
- Alan Velasco (born 2002), Argentine football player
- Alan Vest (1939–2025), New Zealand football player and manager
- Alan Vince (1952–2009), British archaeologist
- Alan Voskuil (born 1986), Danish basketball player

== W ==
- Alan Walker, multiple people
- Alan Watts (1915–1973), British-American philosopher
- Alan Jules Weberman, American writer and political activist
- Alan West, multiple people
- Alan Wiggins (1958–1991), American baseball player
- Alan Wiggins Jr. (born 1985), American basketball player
- Alan White, multiple people
- Alan Wilder (born 1959), English musician
- Alan Williams, multiple people
- Alan Winde (born 1965), South African politician
- Alan Wirth (born 1956), American baseball pitcher
- Alan Wong, British born Chinese legend
- Alan H. B. Wu, American clinical chemist and toxicologist

== X–Z ==
- Alan Young (1919–2016), British-Canadian-American actor
- Alan Zinter (born 1968), American baseball player and coach

== Fictional characters ==
- Alan Garner, from The Hangover trilogy
- Alan Grant, paleontologist from the Jurassic Park franchise
- Alan Harper, a main character in the American sitcom Two and a Half Men (2003–2015)

== See also ==
- Alen (given name)
- Allan (given name)
- Allen (given name)
