= Allan (given name) =

Allan, a variant spelling of Alan, is both a given name and an English and Scottish surname.

== People with the given name ==
=== A–F ===
- Allan (footballer, born 1991), Brazilian footballer
- Allan (footballer, born 1997), Brazilian footballer
- Allan Abbass (born 1962), professor and psychiatrist at Dalhousie University in Halifax, Canada
- Allan Adair (1897–1988), senior officer of the British Army who served in both World Wars
- Allan Adler (1916–2002), American silversmith
- Allan Agar (born 1949), English rugby league footballer and coach
- Allan Ahlberg (born 1938), British children's book writer with his wife Janet Ahlberg as illustrator
- Allan Alaalatoa (born 1994), Australian rugby union player
- Allan Alaküla (born 1968), Estonian journalist
- Allan Albert (1945–1994), American director, producer, and playwright
- Allan Alcorn (born 1948), American pioneering engineer and computer scientist
- Allan Alemán (born 1983), Costa Rican professional football player
- Allan Amato (born 1974), American portrait photographer and film director
- Allan Amin, Indian action film director
- Allan Anderson (disambiguation)
- Allan Andrews (disambiguation)
- Allan Antliff, anarchist activist, art critic, and author
- Allan Arbus (1918–2013), American actor and photographer
- Allan Arkush (born 1948), American film and television director
- Allan Armitage (born 1946), professor of horticulture at the University of Georgia, United States
- Allan Ashbolt (1921–2005), Australian journalist and television broadcaster
- Allan Asher (born 1951), Australian lawyer, consumer advocate, and campaigner
- Allan Ayala (born 1986), track and field athlete from Guatemala
- Allan Aynesworth (1864–1959), stage name of British actor Edward Abbot-Anderson
- Allan Baillie (born 1943), Australian writer
- Allan Baker of Allan Baker and Kevin Crump, Australian rapist and murderer
- Allan Bakke (born 1940), in U.S. Supreme Court decision Regents of the University of California v. Bakke
- Allan Baldwin (1924–2008), Australian rules footballer
- Allan Ball (1943–2018), English footballer
- Allan Blaze (born 1994), Guadeloupean footballer
- Allan Boesak (born 1946), South African cleric, politician, and anti-apartheid activist
- Allan B. Calhamer (1931–2013), American mail carrier who invented the board game Diplomacy
- Allan Campbell (disambiguation)
- Allan Clarke (footballer) (born 1946), English footballer
- Allan Anthony Costly (born 1954), Honduran footballer
- Allan Leslie Cox (1927–1996), Canadian politician
- Allan A. Davidson (fl. 1840–1899), lawyer and political figure in New Brunswick, Canada
- Allan de San Miguel (born 1988), Australian professional baseball player
- Allan Dokossi (born 1999), Central African basketball player
- Allan Donald (born 1966), South African cricketer
- Allan Dwan (1885–1981), Canadian-American film director
- Allan Feldt (born 1963), Danish politician
- Allan Mackay Findlay, British geographer

=== G–Z ===
- Allan George (born 1999), American football player
- Allan Godói (born 1993), Brazilian footballer
- Allan A. Goldstein (born 1949), American film director and screenwriter
- Allan Holdsworth (1946–2017), English guitarist and composer
- Allan Houston (born 1971), American basketball player
- Allan B. Hubbard (born 1947), American economic advisor to George W. Bush
- Allan Jay (1931–2023), British world champion épée & foil fencer
- Allan Jones (cricketer) (born 1947), English cricket umpire and a retired cricketer
- Allan K. (born 1958), Filipino actor, comedian, and TV host
- Allan Kerpan (born 1954), Canadian politician
- Allan Kimbaloula (born 1992), Congolese international footballer
- Allan Kozinn (born 1954), American music critic
- Allan Kwartler (1917–1998), American sabre and foil fencer, Pan American Games and Maccabiah Games champion
- Allan A. Lamport (1903–1999), mayor of Toronto, Canada
- Allan Lane (1909–1973), American film star of cowboy B-movies in the 1940s and 1950s
- Allan MacMaster (born 1974), Canadian politician
- Allan B. Magruder (1775–1822), United States Senator from Louisiana
- Allan Marble (born 1939), Canadian biomedical engineer and medical historian
- Allan Massie (1938–2026), Scottish journalist and writer
- Allan McCollum (born 1944), American artist
- Allan McKinnon (1917–1990), Canadian politician
- Allan Neil McMillan (born 1951), Canadian politician
- Allan Melvin (1923-2008), American actor
- Allan Moffat (1939–2025), Canadian-Australian racing driver
- Allan Morris (born 1940), Australian politician
- Allan A. Moss (1854–1929), mayor of Newport News, Virginia, United States
- Allan Nascimento (1991–2026), Brazilian mixed martial artist
- Allan Alfred Nunweiler (born 1930), Canadian politician, also known as Alf Nunweiler
- Allan Nyom (born 1988), Cameroonian professional footballer
- Allan Arenfeldt Olesen (born 1982), Danish professional football player
- Allan Percy (1577–1611), English politician
- Al Pickard (1895–1975), Canadian ice hockey administrator
- Allan Ray (born 1984), American professional basketball player
- Allan Rowe (politician) (1956–2015), Canadian politician
- Allan Rumbolt, Canadian politician
- Allan A. Ryan Jr. (1903–1981), American financier and politician from New York
- Allan Troy "Sass" Rogando Sasot (born 1983), Filipino transgender woman and vlogger based in China
- Allan A. Schoenherr (1937–2021), Californian author, ecologist, and naturalist
- Allan Sherman (1924–1973), American comedy writer and singer
- Allan Morley Spaar (1876–1960), Sri Lankan public servant and politician, served as second Mayor of Kandy
- Allan "Whitey" Snyder (1914–1994), American Hollywood make-up artist
- Allan Starski (born 1943), Polish Academy Award-winning production designer and set decorator
- Allan Leonard Frederick Stevens (1919–2011), Canadian politician
- Allan Sutter (1914–1988), American Marine Corps Navy Cross recipient
- Allan A. Swenson (1933–2023), author, literary agent, and master gardener
- Allan B. Swift (1935–2018), Emmy award-winning broadcaster and American politician
- Lord Allan Jay Velasco (born 1977), Filipino politician
- Allan Wallenius (1890–1942), Swedish leftist figure and journalist
- Allan B. Walsh (1874–1953), American politician from New Jersey
- Allan Williams (politician) (1922–2011), Canadian politician
- Allan Arthur Willman (1909–1989), American classical pianist, composer, music pedagog
- Allan Zebie (born 1993), Canadian soccer player

== Fictional characters ==
- Allan (Barbie), one of the characters/dolls from the Mattel brand Barbie
- Allan (mascot), a former mascot of the Baltimore Ravens football team
- Allan Thompson (comics), a character from The Adventures of Tintin by Hergé
- Allan-a-Dale, a variant spelling of Alan-a-Dale, a figure in the Robin Hood legend
- Allan Red, a character from Smiling Friends

== See also ==
- Alan (given name)
  - List of people with given name Alan
- Allen (given name)
- Alan (surname)
- Allan (surname)
- Allen (surname)
- Allan (disambiguation)
