= Alan Brown =

Alan Brown may refer to:

== Politics ==
- Alan Grahame Brown (1913–1972), Member of Parliament for Tottenham, 1959–1964
- Alan Brown (Australian politician) (born 1946), Liberal member of the Victorian Legislative Assembly
- Alan Brown (Scottish politician) (born 1970), Member of Parliament (MP) for Kilmarnock and Loudoun, 2015–2024
- Alan Brown (Oregon politician), Member of the Oregon House of Representatives

== Sports ==
- Alan Brown, British tennis player in the 1930s, see 1931 Wimbledon Championships – Men's Singles
- Alan Brown (rugby union, born 1911) (1911–1987), English rugby union player
- Alan Brown (footballer, born 1914) (1914–1996), English football player and manager
- Alan Brown (racing driver) (1919–2004), British Formula 1 racing driver
- Alan Brown (cricketer, born 1933) (1933–2013), English cricketer
- Alan Brown (cricketer, born 1935) (1935–2026), English cricketer
- Alan Brown (footballer, born 1937) (1937–2016), English football forward (Brighton & Hove Albion, Exeter City)
- Alan Brown (cricketer, born 1957), English cricketer
- Alan Brown (footballer, born 1959), English football forward (Sunderland, Newcastle United, Shrewsbury Town, Doncaster Rovers)
- Alan Brown (rugby union, born 1980), Scottish rugby union player

== Other ==
- Alan Brown (British Army officer) (1909–1971), British Army brigadier
- Alan A. Brown (Andor Braun, 1928–2010), Hungarian-born American economist and Holocaust survivor
- A. Whitney Brown (born 1952), American writer and comedian
- Alan Brown (police officer), British police officer
- Alan Brown (filmmaker), American director and author

== See also ==
- Alan Browne (footballer) (born 1995), Irish footballer
- Alan Browne (born 1974), Irish hurler
- Allan Brown (disambiguation)
- Allen Brown (1943–2020), American football player
- Allen W. Brown (1909–1990), Episcopal bishop in America
