= Moorcroft (disambiguation) =

Moorcroft may refer to:

- Moorcroft, a British pottery manufacturer
- Moorcroft (surname)
- Moorcroft, Wyoming, a town in the United States
- Moorcroft pear, also known as the Stinking Bishop pear
- Moorcroft, a play about a Scottish football team written by Eilidh Loan

== See also ==
- Jean Moorcroft Wilson a British academic and writer
