= Allan Brown =

Allan Brown may refer to:

- Allan Brown (Australian footballer) (1924–2014), Australian footballer for Collingwood
- Allan Brown (footballer, born 1926) (1926–2011), Scottish former footballer and manager
- Allan Brown (soccer) (born 1984), South African-born Canadian soccer player
- Allan Brown (RAAF officer) (1895–1964), World War I flying ace
- Allan Brown (water polo) (born 1937), South African Olympic water polo player
- Allan Lister Samuel Brown (1917–1985), politician in Saskatchewan, Canada
- Allan Percy Brown (1912–1994), merchant, boxer and political figure in Saskatchewan

== See also ==
- Alan Browne (born 1974), Irish hurler
- Alan Brown (disambiguation)
- Allen Brown (disambiguation)
