= Albert Anderson =

Albert or Bert Anderson may refer to:

- Albert Anderson (cricketer) (1889–1944), Irish cricketer
- Albert Anderson (politician) (1907–1981), Northern Irish politician
- Albert R. Anderson (1837–1898), U.S. representative from Iowa
- Albert E. Anderson (1885–1966), member of the Maine House of Representatives
- Albert Anderson (19th century), the landowner who founded Horse Cave, Kentucky
- Albert B. Anderson (1857–1938), U.S. federal judge
- Al Anderson (musician) (born 1952), full name Albert Anderson
- Albert Anderson (Montana judge) (1876–1948), justice of the Montana Supreme Court
- Albert Anderson (rugby union) (born 1961), New Zealand rugby union player
- Albert C. Anderson (1878–1954), American politician and newspaper publisher from Mississippi
- Bert Anderson (politician), American politician in the North Dakota House of Representatives

== See also ==
- Albert Andersson (disambiguation)
- Al Anderson (disambiguation)
- Alberta Anderson, American politician
