= Alan Taylor =

Alan Taylor may refer to:

- Alan Taylor (Australian judge) (1901–1969), Australian High Court judge
- A. J. P. Taylor (Alan John Percivale Taylor, 1906–1990), British historian
- Alan Taylor (television presenter) (1924–1997), Welsh television presenter
- Alan Taylor (British judge) (born 1939), British judge
- Alan Taylor (footballer, born 1943), English football manager and former goalkeeper for Blackpool
- Alan D. Taylor (born 1947), mathematician
- Alan Taylor (volleyball) (born 1950), Canadian volleyball player
- Alan Taylor (footballer, born 1953), English football player for West Ham United
- Alan Taylor (historian) (born 1955), United States historian
- Alan Taylor (director) (born 1959), American film director
- Alan M. Taylor (born 1964), economist

== See also ==
- Allan Taylor (disambiguation)
- Alan B. Tayler (1931–1995), British applied mathematician
