= Alf Andersen =

Alf Andersen may refer to:

- Alf Andersen (ski jumper) (1906–1975), Norwegian ski jumper
- Alf Andersen (musician) (1928–1962), Norwegian flautist
- Alf Erik Andersen (born 1973), Norwegian politician
- Alf Andersen (footballer), Norwegian footballer

== See also ==
- Alfred Anderson (disambiguation)
