= 31st Armoured Brigade (United Kingdom) =

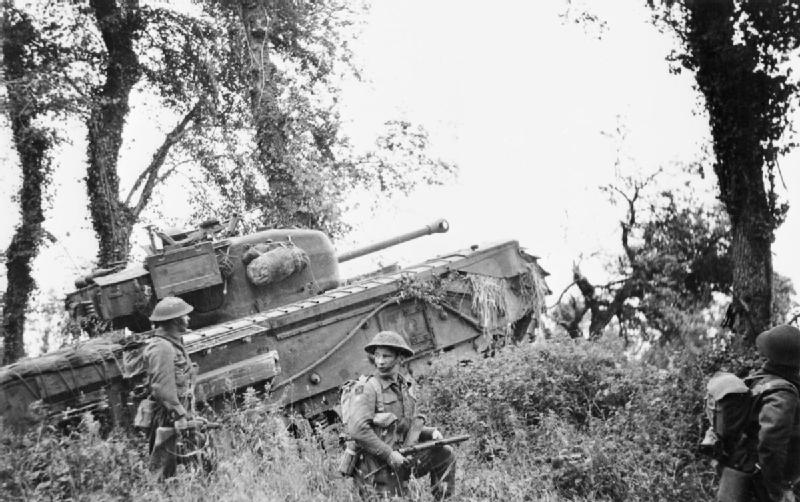
- A Churchill tank of 7th Royal Tank Regiment, 31st Tank Brigade, supporting infantry of 8th Battalion, Royal Scots, during Operation Epsom, 28 June 1944
- Active: 1941–1945
- Country: United Kingdom
- Branch: British Army
- Type: Armoured brigade
- Role: Infantry support Mechanized infantry
- Engagements: Western Front (1944–45)
- Battle honours: Odon; Caen

Insignia
- Formation sign of the 31st Armoured Brigade

The 31st Armoured Brigade was an armoured brigade formation of the British Army, created during the Second World War.

== Unit history ==
The 31st Army Tank Brigade was formed in the UK on 15 January 1941, in Northern Command, and comprised the 9th Royal Tank Regiment and 10th Royal Tank Regiment. The 141st Regiment Royal Armoured Corps (141 RAC) was added on 8 November 1941. On 29 November, the brigade was transferred to South Eastern Command.

In May 1942, the formation was renamed the 31st Tank Brigade and was transferred to the 53rd (Welsh) Infantry Division as part as an experimental "mixed" formation of a tank and two infantry brigades. The experiment ended on 10 September 1943, as it was judged unsuitable for the terrain in north-western Europe. On 1 April 1943, the 10th RTR was renamed 7th Royal Tank Regiment, after the original was destroyed at the Battle of Gazala (May–June 1942). The 31st Tank Brigade, equipped with Churchill tanks, was a follow-up unit in the Normandy landings, arriving in northern France on 19 June 1944. The brigade supported the 15th (Scottish) Infantry Division until the end of July, in operations to capture the town of Caen.

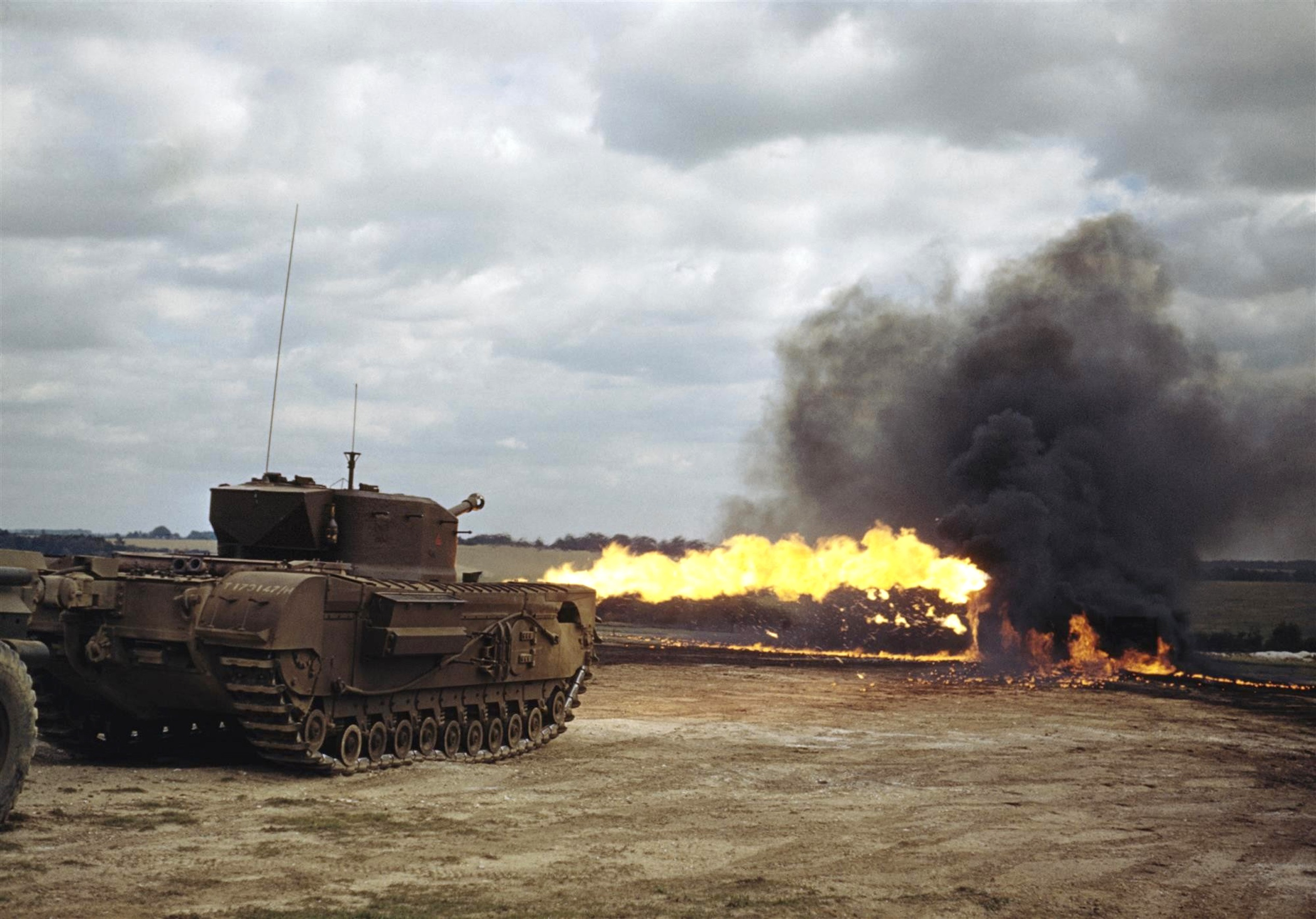
A Churchill tank fitted with a Crocodile flamethrower in action, August 1944.

The 141st Regiment RAC had been detached from the brigade on 21 June to re-equip with the Churchill Crocodile flame-throwing tank; it was decided to convert the rest of the brigade to the "Crocodile". The 7th RTR was detached from the brigade on 17 August 1944 and was briefly replaced by 144th Regiment Royal Armoured Corps on 23 August. The 144th RAC and 9 RTR were detached on 31 August and, on 4 September, the brigade was transferred to the 79th Armoured Division, where the 141st Regiment RAC rejoined and the brigade was brought back up to strength with the addition of 11th Royal Tank Regiment and 1st Fife and Forfar Yeomanry on 2 November. The 11th RTR was detached on 22 December and replaced by the 49th Armoured Personnel Carrier Regiment and the 1st Canadian Armoured Personnel Carrier Regiment, both equipped with the "Kangaroo", a tank with its gun turret removed, generally used as an armoured personnel carrier.

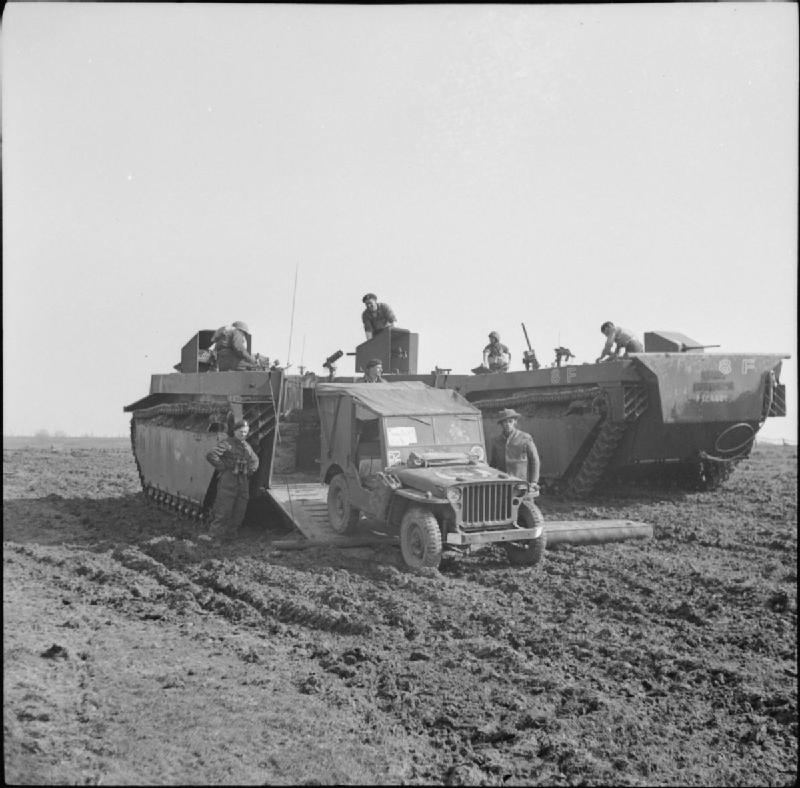
A Buffalo of 4th Royal Tank Regiment unloads a jeep during the crossing of the Rhine, 24 March 1945

On 2 February 1945, the formation became the 31st Armoured Brigade. The 7th RTR, with its Crocodiles, returned on 14 February and the brigade, as part of the 79th Armoured Division, played its part in the Operation Plunder, the crossing of the Rhine, on 24 March. On 15 April, the Western Allied invasion of Germany began; the LVT Buffaloes of the 4th Royal Tank Regiment (formerly the 144th Regiment Royal Armoured Corps) was added to the brigade and was augmented by the Sherman DD tanks of the Staffordshire Yeomanry from 18 to 28 April.

Germany surrendered on 8 May 1945 (V-E Day) and, one week later, the brigade lost the 1st Canadian APC Regiment. The Fife and Forfar Yeomanry were detached on 6 June and replaced by the Royal Scots Greys. As part of the occupation forces in the British Army of the Rhine, the 31st Brigade slowly disbanded, losing the 4th RTR on 9 June 1945, the 49th APC on 1 July, the 7th RTR on 23 August and the 141st Regiment RAC on 27 August. The 3rd Royal Tank Regiment joined on 28 August but, on 31 August, they and the Greys were detached from the 31st Armoured Brigade, bringing an end to the formation.

== Order of battle ==
Sources
Unit	From	To
9th Royal Tank Regiment	15 January 1941	31 August 1944
10th Royal Tank Regiment (renamed 7th Royal Tank Regiment, 22 February 1943)	15 January 1941	17 August 1944
10th Royal Tank Regiment (renamed 7th Royal Tank Regiment, 22 February 1943)	14 February 1945	31 August 1945
141st Regiment Royal Armoured Corps	8 November 1941	21 June 1944
141st Regiment Royal Armoured Corps	4 September 1944	27 August 1945
144th Regiment Royal Armoured Corps	23 August 1944	31 August 1944
1st Fife and Forfar Yeomanry	2 November 1944	6 June 1945
11th Royal Tank Regiment	2 November 1944	22 December 1944
49th Armoured Personnel Carrier Regiment	22 December 1944	1 July 1945
1st Canadian Armoured Personnel Carrier Regiment	22 December 1944	15 May 1945
4th Royal Tank Regiment (formerly 144th Regiment Royal Armoured Corps until 1 March 1945)	15 April 1945	9 June 1945
Staffordshire Yeomanry	18 April 1945	28 April 1945
Royal Scots Greys	6 June 1945	31 August 1945
3rd Royal Tank Regiment	28 August 1945	31 August 1945

== Commanding officers ==
The following officers commanded 31st Brigade:

- Brigadier T. D. Murray (15 January 1941 – 1 March 1941)
- Brigadier T. R. Price (1 March 1941 – 24 August 1942)
- Brigadier G. S. Knight (24 August 1942 – 18 April 1945)
- Brigadier A. W. Brown (18 April 1945 – 31 August 1945)

== See also ==
- British Armoured formations of World War II
- List of British brigades of the Second World War
