= Alan Wu =

Alan Wu may refer to:

- Alan H. B. Wu, American clinical chemist, toxicologist, professor, and author
- Alan Ming-ta Wu (1938/1939–1981), Taiwanese molecular biologist and immunologist

== See also ==
- Allan Wu (born 1972), Singapore-based Chinese-American actor, host, VJ and model
