= Allan Taylor =

Allan Taylor may refer to:

- Allan R. Taylor (born 1932), Canadian banker
- Allan Taylor (diplomat) (1941–2007), Australian diplomat and Director-General of ASIS
- Allan Taylor (footballer) (1905–1981), English professional footballer
- Allan Taylor (British Army officer) (1919–2004), British general
- Allan Kerr Taylor (1832–1890), New Zealand landowner and businessman
- Allan Taylor (snooker player) (born 1984), English snooker player
- Allan Taylor (musician) (born 1945), singer-songwriter

== See also ==
- Alan Taylor (disambiguation)
