= Allan Findlay =

Allan Findlay may refer to:

- Alan Findlay (1873–1943), Scottish trade unionist
- Allan M. Findlay, British geographer
