= Albert Andersson =

Albert Andersson may refer to:

- Albert Andersson (missionary) (1865–1915), Swedish missionary to China
- Albert Andersson (athlete) (1902–1977), Swedish athlete and gymnast
- Albert Andersson (politician) (1878–1962), Swedish politician

== See also ==
- Albert Anderson (disambiguation)
