= Moorcroft (surname) =

Moorcroft is a surname. Notable people with the surname include:

- Alan Moorcroft, British philatelist
- David Moorcroft, English former 1500m and 5000m runner and chairman of UK Athletics
- Errol Moorcroft (1940–2026), South African politician, farmer and author
- Gary Moorcroft, Australian rules footballer
- Judy Moorcroft (1933–1991), British costume designer
- Nick Moorcroft, English screenwriter
- William Moorcroft (explorer), English explorer
- William Moorcroft (potter), potter who founded the Moorcroft pottery
