= Emma Bossons =

British designer (born 1976)

- Born: 1976; Congleton, Cheshire, England
- Occupation(s): ceramic artist and designer

Emma Bossons (born in 1976 in Congleton, Cheshire), is a ceramic artist and designer for Moorcroft Pottery.

== Life ==
Bossons' childhood years were spent living on a dairy farm where she developed a keen interest in watercolour painting. Self-taught with no formal art training, Bossons managed to exhibit her work in art exhibitions, including the British Society of Painters Exhibition in Yorkshire, around the country and won an award for watercolour painting.

Bossons' was a guest judge in the 2023 semi final of The Great Pottery Throw Down, the semi-final aired on 5 March 2023.

== Career ==
Bossons' career began as a painter or ceramic painter at Mason's Ironstone, a subsidiary of Wedgwood, in Hanley, Stoke-on-Trent. This was as part of a £40 per week government training scheme and involved painting the company’s designs onto their pottery.

=== Moorcroft ===
In 1996 Bossons moved to Moorcroft, again as a painter. In 1998 Bossons was promoted to their Moorcroft Design Studio and became their youngest designer. Her first range for Moorcroft, Hepatica, was completed in 2000. Her following range, Queen's Choice, became Moorcroft's best seller for 2001.

Following advice from their bankers, Moorcroft insured Bossons for a widely publicised £1.5 million. Moorcroft Chairman Hugh Edwards described Bossons as "a phenomenon who has helped us in a difficult economic environment" and noted that Bossons' designs were responsible for 40% of the company's £6 million annual sales. Some of her work has sold for more than £11,000; as of 2018 one of her Queen's Choice vases was priced at £12,220.
