= Alan Jacobs =

Alan Jacobs may refer to:

- Alan Jacobs (academic) (born 1958), American writer and professor
- Alan Jacobs (filmmaker), American film director and producer

== See also ==
- Allan Jacobs (1928–2025), American urban designer
- Allen Jacobs (1941–2014), American professional football player
