= Alan McDonald =

Alan, Allan or Allen McDonald, or variants, may refer to:

== Politicians ==
- Al McDonald, Canadian politician
- Alan Angus McDonald (1927–2007), U.S. federal judge
- Alan McDonald (1944–2011), New Zealand union leader and co-leader of the NZ South Island Party
- Allan McDonald (Australian politician) (1888–1953)
- Allan McDonald (New Zealand politician), New Zealand politician
- Allan MacDonald (Western Australian politician) (1892–1978), Australian politician and government minister
- Allan MacDonald (Tasmanian politician) (1853–1898), member of the Tasmanian House of Assembly
- Allan Elliott McDonald (1903–1957), Australian politician
- Allan Macdonald (1794–1862), New York politician

== Sportspeople ==
- Alan McDonald (Australian footballer) (1918–1999), football player for Richmond
- Alan McDonald (Northern Ireland footballer) (1963–2012), association footballer from Northern Ireland
- Alan MacDonald (rugby union) (born 1985), Scottish rugby union player
- Allan McDonald (footballer) (born 1946), Australian rules footballer
- Allan McDonald (tennis) (born 1951), Australian tennis player

== Other people ==
- Alan McDonald (minister), moderator of the General Assembly of the Church of Scotland, 2006
- Alan MacDonald (writer) (born 1958), English children's writer
- Alsy MacDonald (Alan MacDonald, born 1961), Australian rock musician and lawyer
- Alan MacDonald (production designer) (c. 1956–2017), British production designer
- Allan McDonald (cartoonist) (born 1975), Honduran editorial cartoonist
- Allan MacDonald (poet) (1859–1905), Scottish poet and priest
- Allan H. MacDonald (born 1951), American physicist and academic
- Allan J. McDonald (1937–2021), chemical engineer, whistleblower associated with NASA's Space Shuttle Challenger disaster
- Allen MacDonald, screenwriter for the "Dead Doll" episode of American crime drama television series CSI: Crime Scene Investigation
