= Al Anderson =

Al Anderson is the name of:

- Alan Al Anderson (NRBQ) (born 1947), American guitarist, singer, member of the rock NRBQ
- Albert Al Anderson (The Wailers) (born 1952), of the Wailers Band reggae group
- Al Anderson (Canadian football) (1914–1994), Canadian football administrator
- Algodt C. Anderson (1860–1949), Swedish-American politician

== See also ==
- Anderson, AL
- Alan Anderson (disambiguation)
- Alfred Anderson (disambiguation)
- Albert Anderson (disambiguation)
- Alison Anderson (born 1958), Australian politician
- Alexander Anderson (disambiguation)
