= Allan Walker =

Alan Walker may refer to:

- Allan Walker (footballer) (born 1986), Scottish footballer
- Allan S. Walker (1887–1958), Australian Army officer and medical historian

== See also ==
- Alan Walker (disambiguation)
- Allen Walker, a fictional character from D.Gray-man manga and anime series
