= William Moorcroft (potter) =

English potter (1872–1945)

Vase in Hazeldene pattern by William Moorcroft, probably for retail at Liberty's, c. 1905–10

William Moorcroft (1872–1945) was an English potter who founded the Moorcroft pottery business.

== Early and personal life ==
William Moorcroft was born in Burslem, Staffordshire. He studied art at Burslem then in London and Paris.

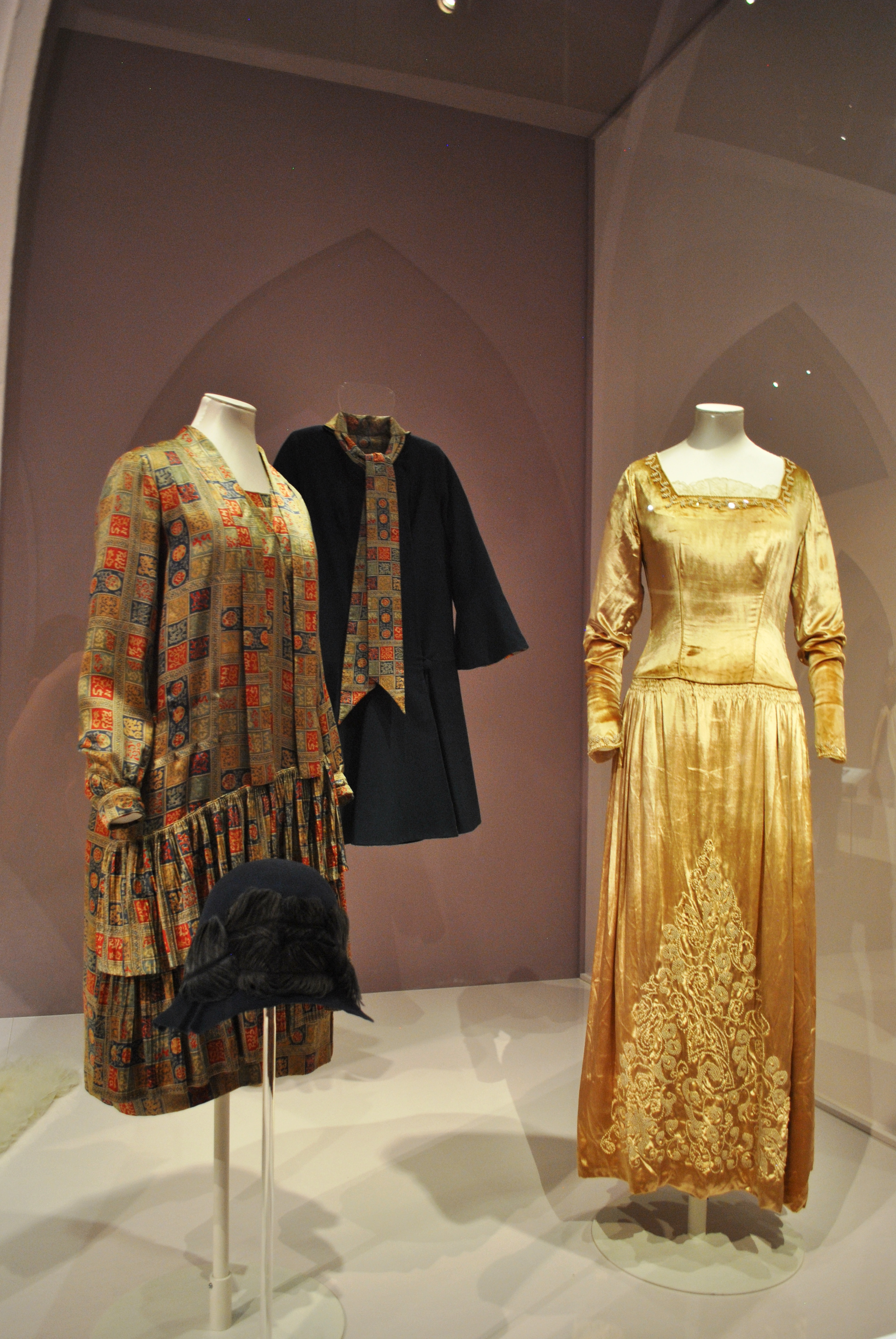
Marian Lasenby's wedding dress on the left, Victoria & Albert Museum

Moorcroft married Florence Nora Fleay Lovibond (1879–1926) in 1913. They had a daughter, Beatrice (1914) and a son, Walter (1917). After the death of his first wife, he married Marian Lasenby, a relative of Arthur Lasenby Liberty, the founder of the department store Liberty & Co.

== Career ==
In 1897 Staffordshire pottery manufacturers James Macintyre & Co. Ltd employed 24-year-old William Moorcroft as a designer, and within a year he was put in full charge of the company's art pottery studio. Early in his employment at Macintyre's, Moorcroft created designs for the company's Aurelian Ware range of high-Victorian pottery, which had transfer-printed and enamelled decoration in bold red, blue and gold colours. Moorcroft developed highly lustred glazes and used oriental shapes and decorations. Some of his techniques were closely guarded trade secrets.

He then developed his famous Florian Ware, with heavy slip and a translucent glaze which produces brilliance of colour. Florian Ware was influenced by Art Nouveau. It was decorated entirely by hand, with the design outlined in trailed slip using a technique known as tubelining. Florian Ware was a great success and won him a gold medal at the World's fair, the St. Louis International Exhibition in 1904. Unusually at that time, he adopted the practice of signing his name, or his initials, on nearly all the pottery he designed, the production of which he personally oversaw. In due course the extent to which his success had overshadowed Macintyre's other manufacturing activities resulted in resentment on the part of his employers, culminating in their decision in 1912 to close down his studio.

In 1913 Moorcroft set up his own factory at Cobridge with staff from Macintyre's, and backed by a financial arrangement with Liberty & Co of London, the business succeeded. Much of the output was sold through Liberty & Co. and Tiffany in New York City. In 1928 Queen Mary made him "Potter to the Queen" through a Royal Warrant, which was stamped on the pottery. His son, Walter joined the company when he was twenty, and took over the management of the pottery in 1945 just before William's death.

== See also ==
- Moorcroft
