= 7th Royal Tank Regiment =

Armoured regiment of the British Army

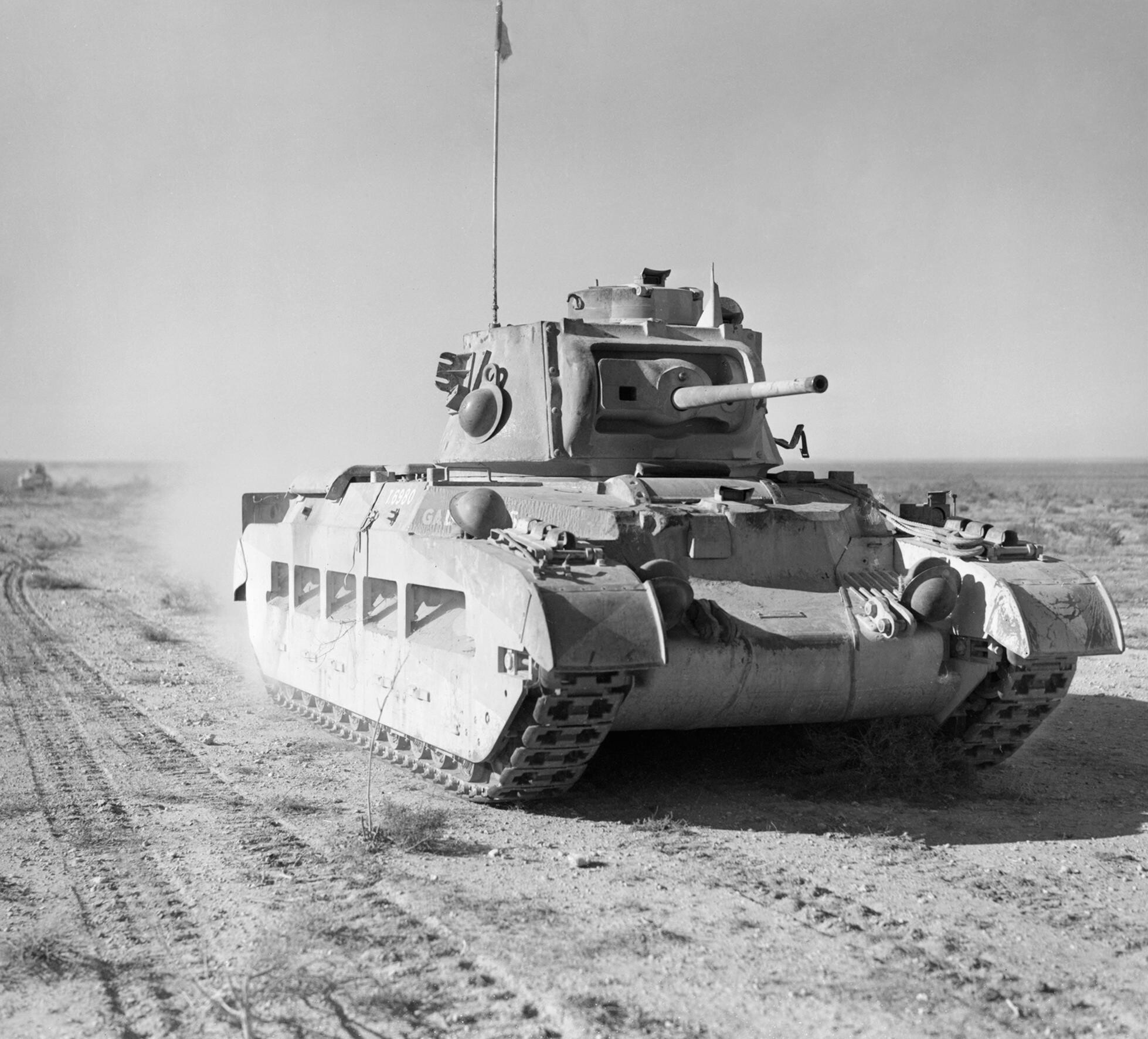
A Matilda tank of the 7th Royal Tank Regiment in the Western Desert.

The 7th Royal Tank Regiment (7th RTR) was an armoured regiment of the British Army from 1917 until disbandment in 1959.

== History ==
The 7th Royal Tank Regiment was part of the Royal Tank Regiment, itself part of the Royal Armoured Corps. The regiment originally saw action as G Battalion, Tank Corps in 1917.

Part of the 1st Army Tank Brigade, 7th RTR saw service in France in May 1940, alongside the 4th Royal Tank Regiment and the 50th (Northumbrian) Infantry Division during the Battle of Dunkirk and was soon evacuated at Dunkirk, and abandoning most of their vehicles. The 7th RTR returned to England and was sent overseas later in the year.

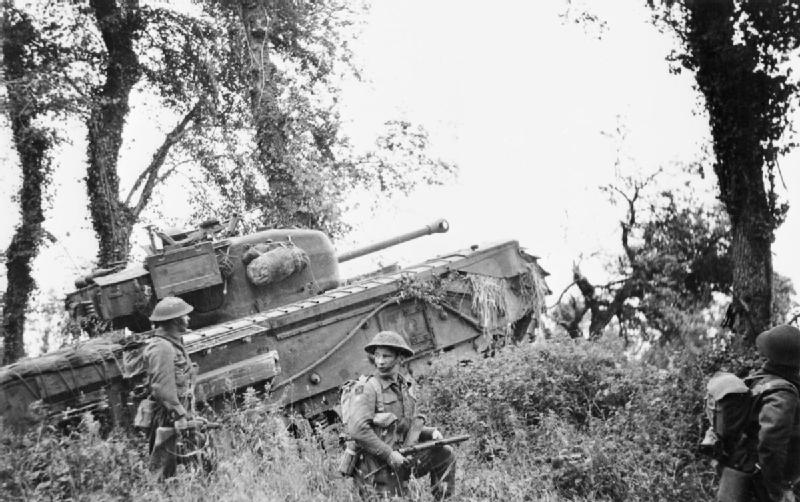
A Churchill tank of the 7th Royal Tank Regiment supporting infantry of the 8th Battalion, Royal Scots, part of 44th Brigade of 15th (Scottish) Division, during Operation Epsom, 28 June 1944.

In December 1940, as part of the British Western Desert Force in Egypt, the 7th RTR contained Matilda infantry tanks and supported the 11th Indian Infantry Brigade of the 4th Indian Infantry Division. The regiment attacked and destroyed the Italian "Maletti Group" at the Nibeiwa Camp. The 7th RTR also supported the attack of the 11th Brigade on Italian positions at the Tummar camps. These attacks were accomplished during the opening stages of Operation Compass. The regiment also participated in the successful attacks on Italian-held Bardia during the same campaign.

In mid-1942, the 7th RTR was captured at Tobruk during the Battle of Gazala, part of the First Battle of El Alamein. Tobruk was surrendered to Italian and German forces on 21 June 1942.

The regiment was reconstituted in 1943 by re-designation of the 10th Royal Tank Regiment, a hostilities-only unit raised in late 1940.

The new 7th RTR joined the 31st Tank Brigade in Normandy on 18 June 1944 and subsequently took part in heavy fighting in Operation Epsom. It participated in the capture of Le Havre and, while detached from its Brigade, it played an active part in the early days of the containment of Dunkirk.

In November 1950, The 7th RTR took part in Korean War.

In 1959, the 7th RTR was amalgamated with 4th Royal Tank Regiment. The regiment lives on as G Squadron, 1st Royal Tank Regiment (1RTR).

== See also ==
- North African Campaign
- Western Desert Campaign
