= Allan Collins =

Allan Collins may refer to:

- Allan Collins (Australian rules footballer) (1919–2006)
- Allan Collins (filmmaker), Australian filmmaker, known for Beneath Clouds (2002)
- Allan Collins (Scottish footballer) (1918–2002), Kilmarnock FC player
- Max Allan Collins (born 1948), American mystery writer
- Allan M. Collins, cognitive and education scientist

== See also ==
- Allen Collins (1952–1990), American musician
- Alan Collins (disambiguation)
- Alan Collins or Alan Collin, pseudonyms of actor Luciano Pigozzi
