= Alan Grant =

Allan or Alan Grant may refer to:

== Alan Grant ==
- Alan Grant (American football) (born 1966), former American football cornerback
- Alan Grant (writer) (1949–2022), comic book writer
- Alan Grant (hurler) (born 1991), Northern Irish hurler
- A. K. Grant (1941–2000), New Zealand humorist

== Allan Grant ==
- Allan Grant (1919–2008), American photojournalist
- Allan Grant (footballer) (born 1973), Scottish former footballer

== Fictional ==
- Inspector Alan Grant, fictional Scotland Yard detective, from a series of mystery novels by Josephine Tey
- Alan Grant (Jurassic Park), a character from the Jurassic Park book and film franchise
- Alan Grant, a character from the 2012 Canadian horror movie American Mary
- Alan Grant, a character from the 2022 film The Whale, who served as Charlie's unseen deceased boyfriend

== See also ==
- Grant Allen (1848–1899), science writer and novelist
- Robert Allen Grant (1905–1998), US Representative and judge
