= Stan Brown (English footballer) =

English footballer (1941–2018)

Personal information
- Full name: Stanley Brown
- Date of birth: 15 September 1941
- Place of birth: Lewes, England
- Date of death: 15 March 2018 (aged 76)
- Height: 5 ft 7 in (1.70 m)
- Position: Wing half

Youth career
- Fulham

Senior career*
Years	Team	Apps	(Gls)
1959–1972	Fulham	353	(16)
1972	→ Brighton & Hove Albion (loan)	9	(0)
1972–1973	Colchester United	23	(0)
1973–1974	Wimbledon		
1974	Margate		
1974–1977	Haywards Heath Town		
- Ringmer
- Southwick
- Burgess Hill Town
- * Club domestic league appearances and goals

Stanley Brown (15 September 1941 – 15 March 2018) was an English footballer who played as a wing half in the Football League.

== Life and career ==
Brown was born in Lewes, East Sussex. Between 1960 and 1972, he made 353 league appearances for Fulham, scoring 16 goals in that period. He was sent on loan to Brighton & Hove Albion in 1972, before moving to Colchester United. At the end of the 1972–73 season, Brown moved on to Wimbledon. He later played non-league football for clubs including Margate, Haywards Heath Town, Ringmer, Southwick and Burgess Hill Town, and went on to coach children in the Lewes area. Brown died in March 2018 at the age of 76.

Brown was one of six brothers who all played football; two of the six, Alan and Irvin, also played at Football League level.

== Honours ==
Fulham

- Football League Third Division runner-up: 1970–71
