= Alan Burton =

Alan Burton may refer to:

- Alan Burton (footballer, born 1991), English footballer
- Alan Burton (footballer, born 1939), English footballer
- Alan Burton (boxer) from ABA Heavyweight Champions
- Alan C. Burton (1904–1979), Canadian physician
