= 10th Royal Tank Regiment =

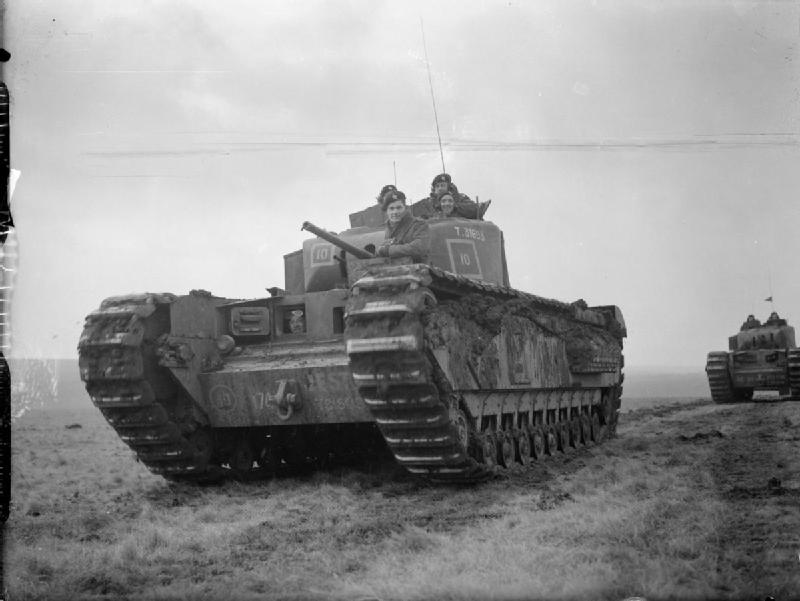
- Country: United Kingdom
- Branch: British Army
- Type: Armoured
- Size: Regiment
- Engagements: World War II

The 10th Royal Tank Regiment (10 RTR) was an armoured regiment of the British Army during World War II. It was part of the Royal Tank Regiment, itself part of the Royal Armoured Corps. In February 1943, it was redesignated as 7th Royal Tank Regiment, replacing the previous 7th, which had been lost at Tobruk.
