= Alan M. Bolle =

American artist

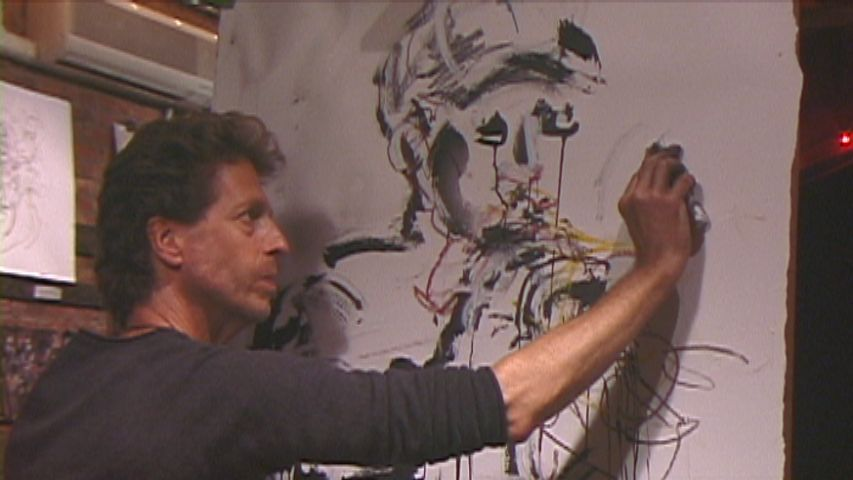
Alan M. Bolle paints Roy Campbell, Jr - Oct 2009

Alan M. Bolle (born October 16, 1958) is an American artist best known as The Springman for his Chicago-based work incorporating springs into media as varied as cars, clothes, and music. More recently he has moved to New York and specialised in depictions of live music performances.

== Biography ==
Bolle studied at the Rhode Island School of Design and Maryland Institute College of Art before setting up his studio in Chicago in the 80s. There he mounted many exhibits and workshops, some of which included musical performances. He also collaborated widely including multimedia performance group Environmental Encroachment, artist groups Mucky Three Plus One and The Ever-So-Secret-Order Of The Lamprey, and the All American Anti War Marching Band, with whom he appeared dressed as a vegetable playing the tuba.

Bolle's work with springs started with an art car - The Spring Car - a car covered with springs. He parked the car outside the Art Chicago exhibit where it received much attention.

By 1998 Bolle had extended his spring work to clothes and adopted the character of 'Springman' - an eccentric genteel superhero. He returned to Art Chicago with a second version of The Spring Car - a BMW 2002 painted red with blue circles and adorned with 5,000 chrome and iridescent plated springs and paraded around the exhibit as ' The Spring Ambassador'. Bolle continued to make his unofficial appearances at Art Chicago until 2001 when he was arrested.

Bolle's The Spring Cow - a contribution to the Cows On Parade in 1999 - was well received. His 'Spring Bikini' received TV coverage.

After moving to New York in 2005 Bolle did various projects, including Camouflage Installation at Chashama in Oct 2006., before settling on his current oeuvre of portraying live performances by musicians.

The Spring Car is featured in the book 'Art Cars' by Harrod Blank, and also in Blank's film Automorphosis. The film premiered at the Santa Barbara International Film Festival in Jan 2009, and won the audience award for best documentary at the San Francisco Independent Film Festival in February 2009.
