= Alan Lee =

Alan Lee may refer to:

- Alan Lee (bandleader) (1936–2022), Australian jazz bandleader, vibraphonist, guitarist and percussionist
- Alan Lee (illustrator) (born 1947), English book illustrator and movie conceptual designer
- Alan Lee (footballer) (born 1978), Irish footballer
- Alan Lee (cricket writer) (1954–2015), British cricket writer
- Alan David Lee (born 1955 or 1956), Australian actor
- Alan Lee (voice actor) (born 1996), American voice actor known for anime and video games

== See also ==
- Allan Lee (born 1963), film editor
- Allen Lee (1940–2020), Hong Kong politician
- Allen S. Lee, scholar of Information Systems research
