= Alan Murphy (disambiguation) =

Alan Murphy (1953–1989), English musician.

Al(l)an or Allen Murphy may also refer to:

- Alan Murphy (footballer, born 1981), Irish footballer and coach
- Alan Murphy (hurler) (born 1996), Irish hurler
- Allan Murphy, Canadian political candidate
- Allen Murphy (born 1952), basketball player
- Alan Murphy, in 2013 All-Ireland Minor Hurling Championship
