= Albert Andersson (politician) =

Swedish politician

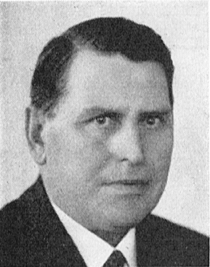
- Born: August 29, 1878; Österlövsta Parish, Uppsala, Sweden
- Died: June 19, 1962 (aged 83); Österlövsta Parish, Uppsala, Sweden
- Occupations: Politician, farmer
- Title: Member of the First Chamber (Stockholm & Uppsala counties)
- Term: 1939-1946
- Political party: Centre Party

Albert Andersson (29 August 1878 – 19 June 1962) was a Swedish politician. He was a member of the Centre Party.
