= Alan O'Neill =

Alan O'Neill may refer to:

- Alan O'Neill (footballer, born 1937), English football player for Sunderland and Aston Villa
- Alan O'Neill (footballer, born 1957), Irish football player and manager of Shamrock Rovers
- Alan O'Neill (footballer, born 1973), Irish football player for Birmingham City
- Alan O'Neill (actor) (1971–2018), Irish actor
