= Allan Anderson (footballer) =

Australian rules footballer (1944–2013)

Personal information
- Full name: Allan Anderson
- Born: 4 February 1944
- Died: 2 November 2013 (aged 69)
- Original team: Yea
- Height: 178 cm (5 ft 10 in)
- Weight: 73 kg (161 lb)

Playing career^{1}
Years	Club	Games (Goals)
1963	Fitzroy	4 (0)
- ^{1} Playing statistics correct to the end of 1963.

Allan Anderson (4 February 1944 – 2 November 2013) was an Australian rules footballer who played for the Fitzroy Football Club in the Victorian Football League (VFL).

Anderson crossed to Williamstown in the VFA in 1966 and played 15 games in his only season with the Seagulls, kicking one goal.
