= Alan Taylor (British judge) =

British judge (born 1939)

His Honour Alan Broughton Taylor (born 23 January 1939) is a British judge.

Alan Taylor graduated from Birmingham University with an LLB degree in law in 1960, going on to undertake postgraduate research at Brasenose College, Oxford. He was called to the Bar by Gray's Inn in 1961.

Alan Taylor was appointed as a Circuit Judge, sitting on the Midland Circuit, in 1991. He became the Legal Member of the Mental Health Review Tribunal, Restricted Patients Panel, in 2001. He was a president of the Mental Health Review Tribunal from 2004 to 2009. His Honour Alan Taylor retired from the Circuit Bench on the Midland Circuit in 2005. He was a part-time Deputy Circuit Judge on the Northern Circuit from 2005 to 2007.

In his foreword to Civitas book Crime And Civil Society Can We Become A More Law-Abiding People? (2005) Taylor stated his belief that:

Regrettably, this study shows that the courts have little effect when it comes to preventing people from reoffending. Crime will only be reduced by a vastly increased rate of detection and by targeting children in deprived and vulnerable situations in order to compensate for the absent role models in their lives.
