= Alan J. Bauman =

American surgeon

Alan J. Bauman is an American hair transplant surgeon and hair restoration physician. He is the Medical Director and CEO of Bauman Medical Hair Transplant and Hair Loss Treatment Center in Boca Raton, FL. Bauman is a Fellow of the International Society of Hair Restoration Surgery (FISHRS), a certified diplomate of the American Board of Hair Restoration Surgery (ABHRS), and member of the International Alliance of Hair Restoration Surgery (IAHRS). He is the founder of the non-profit 501(c)(3) Bauman Philanthropic Foundation, which provides pro bono hair restoration, surgical hair transplants, and medical treatments to patients in need.

== Biography ==
Bauman received his Medical Doctor degree from New York Medical College in Valhalla, NY and had internship and residency training in surgery at Beth Israel Medical Center and Mt. Sinai Medical Center in Manhattan before specializing in hair transplant surgery and the treatment of hair loss, including primarily androgenetic alopecia or hereditary male or female pattern hair loss.

Bauman came to national prominence in 2006 for his role in pioneering eyelash implants at the world’s first International Society of Hair Restoration Surgery (ISHRS) Live Surgery Workshop for Eyelash Transplantation in Torrance, California.

Bauman has been credited with pioneering low level laser therapy (LLLT) for hair loss, minimally-invasive follicular unit extraction (FUE) hair transplants, PRP Platelet Rich Plasma, prostaglandin analogs for hair growth like bimatoprost, hair loss genetic tests, and live surgery webcasts.

Bauman was the first hair transplant surgeon to demonstrate the FUE method of hair transplantation at the 2003 International Society of Hair Restoration Surgery Orlando Live Surgery Workshop and developed the first commercially available instrument specifically for manual extraction of FUE grafts, called the 'Bauman MINDEX.'

In 2017, Bauman was voted "#1 Top Hair Restoration Surgeon" and received the Crystal Diamond Award by Aesthetic Everything. In 2018 he was again voted "#1 Top Hair Restoration Surgeon." In 2019, he received the "#1 Top Hair Restoration Physician" award and was also listed amongst the "Top 100 Aesthetic Doctors" in the Aesthetic Everything 2019 Aesthetic and Cosmetic Medicine Awards.

Bauman was featured in the 2018 Forbes article entitled "10 CEOs Transforming Healthcare in America".
