= Allan Albert =

American dramatist

Allan Praigrod Albert (June 29, 1945, New York City - June 10, 1994, New York City) was a director, producer, and playwright. He attended Amherst College and the Yale School of Drama. He has served as artistic director at the Charles Playhouse in Boston and the Berkshire Theatre Festival in Stockbridge, Massachusetts. In 1972 he started Allan Albert Productions. He also created the National Educational Television series How Can I Tell You?.

Albert died from lymphoma on June 10, 1994, in New York City.

== Bibliography ==
- Corral (1975)
- The Wanted Wagon (1975)
- The Whale Show (1975)
- The Boston Tea Party (1976)
