= Allan Andrews =

Alan, Allen or Allan Andrews may refer to:

- Allan Andrews (politician) (born 1940), Australian politician, member for Heathcote from 1988 to 1991
- Alan Andrews, in 1985 Pittsburgh Steelers season
- Alan Andrews, on List of science fiction films of the 2010s
- Alan Andrews, musician of The Photo Atlas
- Allen Andrews (author) (1913–1985), British author
- Allen Andrews (politician) (born 1967), American politician, member of the Missouri House of Representatives
