= Allan A. Swenson =

American author, literary agent and master gardener

Allan Armstrong Swenson (December 26, 1933 – April 14, 2023) was an author, literary agent and master gardener. He worked for over 25 years as a nationally syndicated newspaper columnist and radio-TV personality, and is the author of more than 50 books.

== Early life ==
Swenson was born in Clifton, New Jersey, to Harold Oscar and Amy Tudor Dugdale Swenson. As a boy, he was a very active member of the 4-H Club. Swenson earned his Phi Beta Kappa Key at Rutgers University, where he received a BA degree in Journalism.

== Career ==
Following graduation, Swenson became a radio and television writer at WNBC in New York for the Phil Alampi shows.

Swenson was recruited into Army Intelligence while serving as a Cadet Colonel of the Army ROTC at Rutgers University. He served as an intelligence officer, holding the rank of captain, during active duty with the 525th MI Group and with the XVIII Airborne Corps during the 1950s. From this experience, Swenson wrote his Guide to the CIA and Guide to National Security.

After leaving the military, Swenson became a writer in New York City, working as a copywriter and an account executive for the advertising agencies Albert Sidney Noble and Dancer-Fitzgerald-Sample. Swenson formed his own Public Relations Agency in NYC in the 1960s, serving clients including American Cyanamid, Topper Toys, Eastern Airlines, and Shell Chemical.

During this time, and for more than 25 years, Swenson wrote a gardening column for NEA-United Media which appeared in more than 200 papers nationwide.

Swenson founded Camp America and created its nationwide 'Fly In-Camp Out' program. With outfitters in major cities, his organization enabled families to fly from their home areas, rent van campers or motor homes and explore outdoor America. He later sold the organization to Winnebago Industries.

Based on his ongoing gardening columns, Swenson became an author and wrote more than 50 books published by Doubleday, Random House, McMillan, Penguin and other publishers. His series of Plants of the Bible, Herbs of the Bible and Foods Jesus Ate led to his periodic appearance on television programs, including the 700 Club. He also wrote the Inflation Fighter's Victory Garden; Inflation Fighters Preserving Guide; Plan Your Own Landscape; Landscape You Can Eat; and dozens of specialty garden books. He also wrote the L.L. Bean Canoeing Handbook, which is held by more than 400 libraries around the world.

For young readers, Swenson wrote a book series including World Beneath Your Feet, World Above Your Head and World In A Tidal Pool. Under his pen name for children's books, Virginia Langley, he authored Hurray for Christopher Cat about a Maine Coon cat, Thar She Blows about a whale-watching trip, Babes in the Woods about baby animals and their habitats, and several others.

Over the years, Swenson appeared on various network TV shows about his books, including appearing as Dr. Plant on the syndicated Good Day Show and as the Good Growing Guy on Good Morning America. He then created his own Gardener's Notebook TV series for syndication. Before moving to Maine with his family in 1974, Swenson had his own radio show on 400 stations of the Mutual Radio Network from New York City which also was carried by independent stations.

After moving to Maine, Swenson created a Book Division for the Gannett Publishing Company. Among the authors of the eighty books he published during his ten-year tenure as Editor-in-Chief were Bill Caldwell and Marjorie Standish.

Swenson wrote extensively for, and attended, the Leif Ericson Millennium Celebration in 2000 in Greenland. Following this, he wrote many articles about Norse history for a wide range of Scandinavian-America publications. In recognition of his work honoring early Scandinavian culture, Swenson was honored by the King and Queen of Denmark.

At the age of 70, Swenson, with his wife Sheila, began speaking and giving slide shows on cruise ships of Royal Caribbean, Celebrity, Norwegian, and Princess Cruise Lines about his books as well as about ports of call in the Caribbean, Baltic and other areas. Later they gave presentations about their travels to residents at senior centers and retirement facilities in Maine and New Hampshire.

== Associations ==
Swenson was a member of the Overseas Press Club, affiliated with the National Press Club and Deadline Club. He also was a long time member of the Garden Writers Association. He helped found both the New England and Maine Chapters of the Association of Former Intelligence Officers.

== Personal life ==
Swenson and his wife Sheila raised four boys: Peter, Drew, Boyd and Meade who all live nearby in Maine with their families.

== Bibliography ==
- Swenson, Allan A The Ships, Sagas, and Explorations of the Vikings Skyhorse (September 13, 2014) ISBN 978-1602397705
- Swenson, Allan A Foods Jesus Ate and How to Grow Them Skyhorse (February 15, 2011)
- Swenson, Allan A Great Growing at Home Taylor Trade(January 28, 2008) ISBN 978-1589792654
- Swenson, Allan A Praising the Gifts of God Citadel (September 1, 2005) ISBN 0806526556
- Swenson, Allan A Herbs of the Bible Citadel (May 1, 2003) ISBN 978-0806524238 Illustrations by Peter Jon Swenson
- Swenson, Allan A The Everything Landscaping Book Adams Media Corporation (March 2003) ISBN 978-1580628617
- Swenson, Allan A The Everything Gardening Book Adams Media Corporation (March 2003) ISBN 978-1580628600
- Benson, Michael; Coulson, Daniel O and Swenson, Allan The Complete Idiot's Guide to National Security Alpha (October 7, 2003) ISBN 978-1592571390
- Swenson, Allan A Flowers of the Bible: And How to Grow Them Citadel (October 1, 2002) ISBN 978-0806523149
- Swenson Allan and Benson Michael The Complete Idiot's Guide to the CIA Alpha (August 1, 2002)I ISBN 978-0028643960
- Swenson, Allan A L.L.Bean Canoeing Handbook Lyons (July 1, 2000) ISBN 978-1558219779
- Swenson, Allan; Swenson, Boyd and Fink, Kathy Rural York County, ME Arcadia (June 6, 1995) ISBN 978-0738564173
- Swenson, Allan A Plants of the Bible: And How to Grow Them Citadel (June 1, 2000) ISBN 978-0806516158
- Swenson, Allan A The Gardener's Book of Berries Lyons (February 1, 1994) ISBN 978-1558212824
- Swenson, Allan A Fruit Trees for the Home Gardener Lyons (October 1, 1994) ISBN 978-1558213081
- Swenson, Allan A Your Biblical Garden: Plants of the Bible and How to Grow Them Doubleday (January 1981) ISBN 978-0385148986
- Swenson, Allan A Bush country by George! Gannett (1981) ISBN 978-0930096298
- Swenson, Allan A Secrets of a Seashore Gannett (June 1981) ISBN 978-0930096281
- Swenson, Allan A Wood Heat Fawcett (January 12, 1980) ISBN 978 -0449142486
- Swenson, Allan A The world within the tidal pool McKay (1979) ISBN 978-0679210535
- Swenson, Allan A 100 Oldtime Roses for Gardens of Today McKay (1979) ISBN 978-0679512509
- Swenson, Allan A The world beneath your feet: Animals that live underground McKay (1978) 5 ISBN 978-0679204411
- Swenson, Allan A Plan Your Own Landscape Grosset & Dunlap (1978) ISBN 978-0448143835
- Swenson, Allan A The Gardener's Almanac Grosset & Dunlap (1978) ISBN 978-0448127828
- Swenson, Allan A The world above your head: Animals that live in trees, barns, and on cliffs McKay (1978) ISBN 978-0679210511
- Swenson, Allan A Starting over: How to recharge your life-style and career A & W Publishers (1978) ISBN 978-0894790188
- Swenson, Allan A Landscape You Can Eat McKay (1977) ISBN 978-0679506478
- Swenson, Allan A Allan A Swenson's Big fun to grow book McKay (1977)
- Swenson, Allan A Cultivating Carnivorous Plants Book World (December 1976) ISBN 978-0385111485
- Swenson, Allan A My Own Herb Garden Rodale Pr (November 1976) ISBN 978-0878571291
- Swenson, Allan A The Inflation Fighter's Victory Garden Ballantine Books (February 12, 1975) ISBN 978-0345242884
- Swenson, Allan A Terrariums Fawcett (1975)
- Swenson, Allan A The practical book of organic gardening Award Books (1973)
