= Alan Rees =

Alan Rees may refer to:

- Alan Rees (racing driver) (1938–2024), British racing driver
- Alan Rees (composer) (1941–2005), Welsh Roman Catholic monk, organist and composer
- Alan Rees (rugby) (1938–2022), Welsh rugby union and rugby league footballer, and cricketer
