= Albert E. Anderson =

American politician

Member of the Maine House of Representatives from the Portland district
- In office 1917–1918

Personal details
- Born: September 22, 1885
- Died: May 12, 1966 (aged 80) Portland, Maine, U.S.
- Party: Republican
- Occupation: Attorney & State Legislator

Albert Edward Anderson (September 22, 1885 – May 12, 1966) was an American lawyer and Republican politician from Maine. He represented Portland in the Maine House of Representatives from 1917 – 1918. He was an alternate delegate to the 1948 Republican National Convention.

Anderson was born in Portland, Maine to Andrew B. and Mary Parsons Anderson. He graduated from Portland High School in 1904 and the University of Maine in 1909. Maine awards a scholarship in his name each year "to worthy students of Scandinavian descent."

He was elected to the Portland Common Council in 1910-11. He was elected to the Maine House of Representative in 1916 and served before resigning to enlist in the U.S. Army during World War I. During the war, he became a first lieutenant and served as an instructor in Columbus, Ohio. After the war, he joined the recently-formed American Legion; Anderson later became the third commander of the Harold T. Andrews Post in Portland. He was also became a prominent Freemason.
