= Alan Anderson =

Alan or Allan Anderson may refer to:

- Alan Anderson (basketball) (born 1982), basketball player
- Alan Anderson (British public servant) (1877–1952), public servant and shipowner
- Alan Anderson (footballer) (1939–2022), Scottish former professional footballer
- Alan Orr Anderson (1879–1958), Scottish historian
- A. Paul Anderson (born 1961), American commissioner for the Federal Maritime Commission
- Alan Ross Anderson (1925–1973), American logician
- Allan Anderson (baseball) (born 1964), American baseball player
- Allan Anderson (cricketer) (born 1949), Australian cricketer
- Allan Anderson (footballer) (1944–2013), Australian rules footballer
- Allan Anderson (theologian) (born 1949), Anglo-Zimbabwean theologian
- Allan Cunningham Anderson (1896–1986), Canadian newspaperman and diplomat

== See also ==
- Al Anderson (disambiguation)
