= Allan McDonald (cartoonist) =

- Born: Norman Allan Sauceda; 8 October 1975 (age 51)
- Area: Cartoonist

Allan McDonald (born 8 October 1975) is a Honduran editorial cartoonist. "McDonald" is a pen name; his real name is "Norman Allan Sauceda". Known for supporting the government of the deposed Manuel Zelaya that favored Hugo Chávez interference in Honduras. He worked for many years in El Heraldo:-,. In 2013, Allan received an award from the Press Emblem Campaign, an organization that focuses on increasing "the legal protection and safety of journalists". The award, "Protection of Journalists and Press Freedom 2013" (Spanish: Protección de los Periodistas y la Libertad de Prensa 2013), had never been given to a cartoonist before.

He currently works for the Televicentro company -with right-wing ideology- where he illustrates social and sports issues.
