= Allen Brown (disambiguation) =

Allen Brown (1943–2020) was an American football player.

Allen Brown may also refer to:

- Allen Brown (public servant) (1911–1999), Australian public servant
- Allen W. Brown (1909–1990), Episcopal bishop in America
