= Albert Anderson (cricketer) =

Irish cricketer

Personal information
- Full name: Albert Edwin Anderson
- Born: 13 April 1889; Comber, Ireland
- Died: 21 September 1944 (aged 55); Comber, Northern Ireland
- Batting: Right-handed

Domestic team information
- Years: Team
- 1926: Ireland

Career statistics
Competition	First-class
Matches	1
Runs scored	18
Batting average	9.00
100s/50s	–/–
Top score	18
Catches/stumpings	–/–
- Source: Cricinfo, 27 October 2021

Albert Edwin Anderson (13 April 1889 in County Down – 21 September 1944 in County Down) was an Irish cricketer. He was a right-handed batsman who played once for Ireland, a first-class match against Wales in 1926.
