= Tubelining =

Tubelining is a technique of ceramic decoration. It involves squeezing a thin line of clay body through a nozzle onto the ware being decorated. An alternative term is "slip trailing".

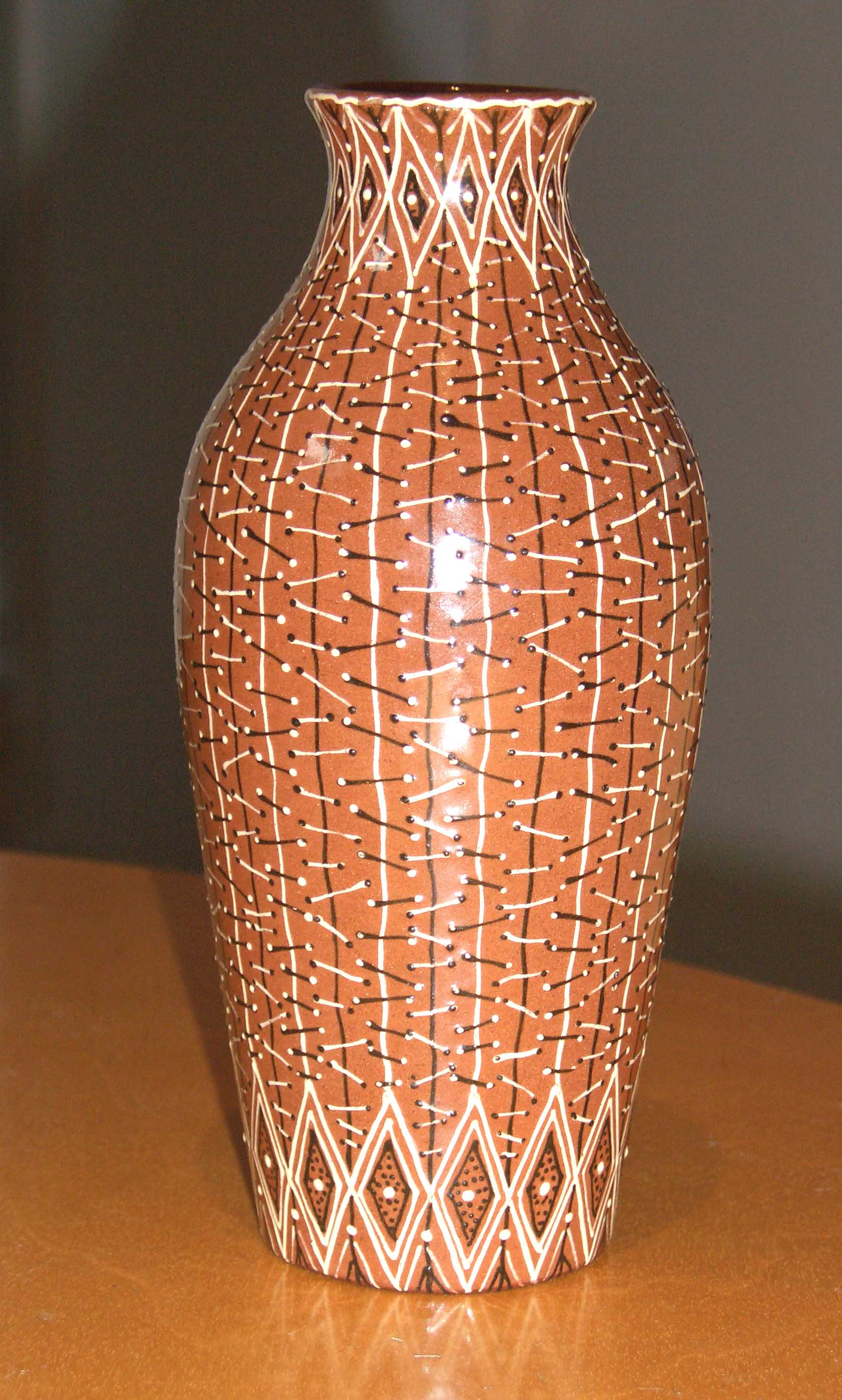
tube-lined vase, dated 1957, by Jessie Tait

The skill takes time to acquire and it is associated with art pottery rather than mass production.

== UK production ==
Tubelining has been used by a number of firms in the Staffordshire Potteries. In particular, the Moorcroft pottery continues to be well known for using tubelining as an integral feature of its designs.

== USA production ==
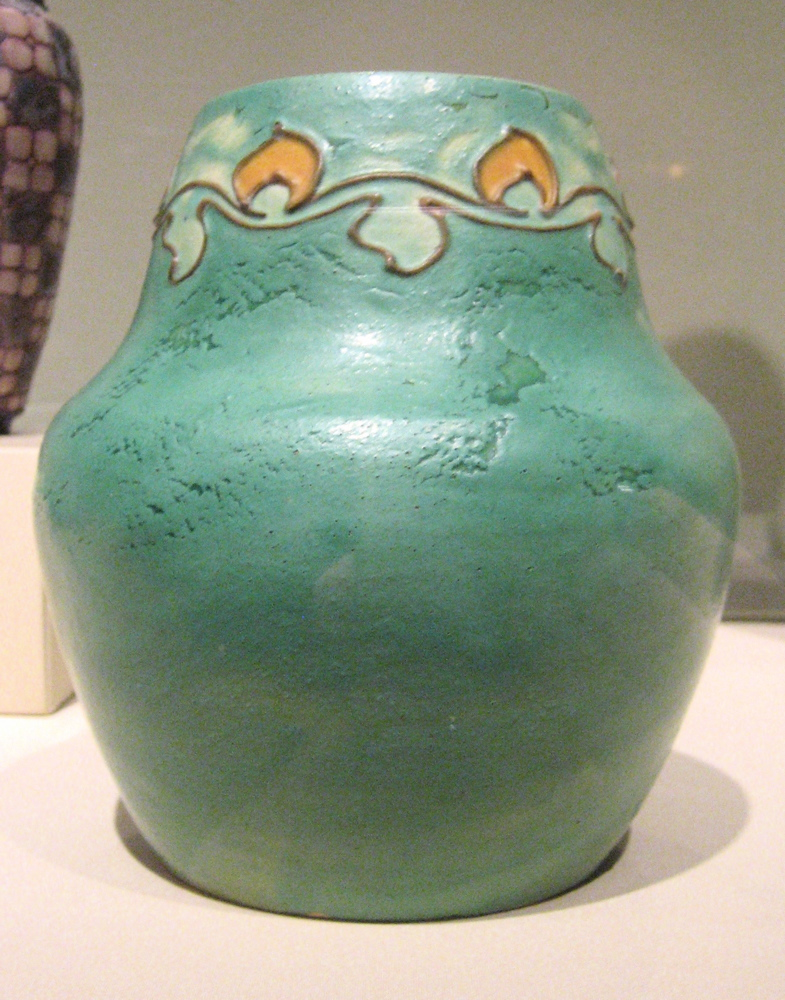
Vase produced by the Arequipa Pottery

Designers using tubelining included Frederick Hurten Rhead, who taught the technique at the Arequipa Pottery in California.

== See also ==
- Charlotte Rhead
