= Alan Norris =

Alan Norris may refer to:

- Alan Norris (darts player) (born 1972), English darts player
- Alan Eugene Norris (born 1935), U.S. federal judge
- Alan J. Norris, 2000 winner of the Scottish Chess Championship
