= Alan Judge =

Alan Judge may refer to:

- Alan Judge (English footballer) (born 1960), former footballer
- Alan Judge (Irish footballer) (born 1988), Irish footballer
