= Allan Taylor (footballer) =

English footballer

Personal information
- Full name: Allan Taylor
- Date of birth: 1 December 1905
- Place of birth: North Shields, England
- Date of death: 1981 (aged 75–76)
- Height: 5 ft 6 1/2 in (1.69 m)
- Position: Goalkeeper

Senior career*
Years	Team	Apps	(Gls)
	North Shields	?	
1925	Newcastle United	1	
1926–1928	South Shields	34	
1931–1936	Tottenham Hotspur	60	
1937	Hartlepool United	25	
- * Club domestic league appearances and goals

Allan Taylor (1 December 1905 – 1981) was an English professional footballer who played for North Shields, Newcastle United, South Shields, Tottenham Hotspur and Hartlepool United.

== Football career ==
Taylor began his career at his local Non league club North Shields before joining Newcastle United in 1925. The goalkeeper signed for South Shields in 1926 where he played in 34 matches. In 1931 he joined Tottenham Hotspur, between 1931 and 1936 he featured in 70 matches in all competitions for the Spurs. After leaving White Hart Lane he went on to play for Hartlepool United where he made a further 25 appearances before ending his playing career.
