= Alan Keane =

Alan Keane may refer to:

- Alan Keane (Gaelic footballer) (active since 2001), Irish Gaelic football player
- Alan Keane (association footballer) (born 1984), Irish footballer
- Alan Keane, a character in The Amazing World of Gumball franchise

== See also ==
- Alan Keen (1937–2011), British politician
