= Alan Taylor (volleyball) =

Canadian volleyball player (born 1950)

Personal information
- Born: 11 December 1950 (age 74) Pincher Creek, Alberta, Canada

Sport
- Sport: Volleyball

Alan Taylor (born 11 December 1950) is a Canadian volleyball player. He competed in the men's tournament at the 1976 Summer Olympics.
