= Alan O'Hara =

Irish footballer

Personal information
- Date of birth: September 16, 1983 (age 43)
- Place of birth: County Mayo, Ireland
- Height: 6 ft 2 in (1.88 m)
- Position: Defender

Youth career
- 2003–04: Thomas (NAIA)
- 2005–06: Clemson

Senior career*
Years	Team	Apps	(Gls)
2006	Richmond Kickers Future	12	(0)
2007	Crystal Palace Baltimore	6	(0)
2007	→ Cleveland City Stars (loan)	1	(0)
2008–2010	Lansdowne Bhoys	40	(5)
2010	Brooklyn Italians	12	(1)
2011	Aegean Hawks	16	(0)
- * Club domestic league appearances and goals as of 12/08/2007

Alan O'Hara (born September 16, 1983) is an Irish footballer currently a free agent. He is a central defender. Alan has previously played for the Richmond Kickers, Thomas University and the Clemson Tigers in which he was named to the NSCAA All-South Region Team.

O'Hara was loaned to the Cleveland City Stars for their first game of the USL2 2007 season. O'Hara currently plays for the Aegean Hawks of the WPL.
