= Alan Collins =

Alan Collins may refer to:

- Alan Collins (actor), pseudonym of Luciano Pigozzi (1927–2008), Italian film actor
- Alan Collins (writer) (1928–2008), Australian-Jewish author
- Alan Collins (sculptor) (1928–2016), English-born sculptor
- Alan Collins (diplomat) (born 1948), British diplomat
- Alan Collins (filmmaker), Australian cinematographer who trained at Central Australian Aboriginal Media Association in the 1990s

== See also ==
- Allan Collins (disambiguation)
