= Moorcroft =

Former British pottery manufacturer

Coordinates: 53°02′22″N 2°11′05″W

W. Moorcroft Limited
- Type: Private
- Industry: Pottery
- Founded: 1913
- Founder: William Moorcroft
- Headquarters: Burslem, Stoke-on-Trent, England
- Products: Art pottery
- Owners: Will Moorcroft
- Number of employees: 120
- Website: www.moorcroft.com

W. Moorcroft Limited (trading as W Moorcroft Ltd) is a British art pottery manufacturer specialising in richly decorated earthenware, based at Burslem in Stoke-on-Trent, England. The company was founded in 1913 by William Moorcroft, and remained in the family until 2006 when Moorcroft's son retired. In 2025, the company announced its closure; in June of the same year the company was bought by the founder's grandson Will Moorcroft, with support from London department store Liberty.

== History ==
In 1897, Staffordshire pottery manufacturers James Macintyre & Co. Ltd garnered a prodigious talent by employing 24-year-old William Moorcroft as a designer, and within a year, he was put in full charge of the company's art pottery studio. Moorcroft's first innovative range of pottery, called Florian Ware, was a great success and won him a gold medal at the 1904 world's fair (the Louisiana Purchase Exposition in St. Louis, Missouri). Unusually at that time, he adopted the practice of signing his name, or his initials, on nearly all the pottery he designed, the production of which he personally oversaw.

In due course, the extent to which his success had overshadowed Macintyre's other manufacturing activities resulted in resentment on the part of his employers, culminating in their decision in 1912 to close down his studio. He then set up his own company, and the following year, production of his pottery was transferred to a brand new factory nearby.

The Moorcroft factory produced an extensive array of moderately-priced domestic tableware items in addition to its famous tubelined, hand-painted art pottery. Moorcroft's reputation was enhanced when Queen Mary, a keen collector of his works, granted him a royal warrant in 1928. Shortly before the death of William in 1945, his elder son, Walter Moorcroft, took control of the business, which he continued to develop. The company's royal warrant was re-issued in his name in 1946.

Between its founding and its leadership under Walter Moorcroft, the company had been financed in collaboration with the famous London store, Liberty. The Liberty store's interest was bought out by Moorcroft in 1962.

Rising fuel and labour costs brought Moorcroft, with its highly labour-intensive techniques, into financial difficulties and in an attempt to mass-produce Moorcroft pottery, part of the company was sold to the Roper Brothers in 1984. This attempt was unsuccessful, and in 1986 Roper Brothers' share was resold to business partners Hugh Edwards and Richard Dennis. In 1992, Dennis and his pottery designer wife, Sally Tuffin, left the company, leaving the Edwards family as sole owners (remaining so in 2008).

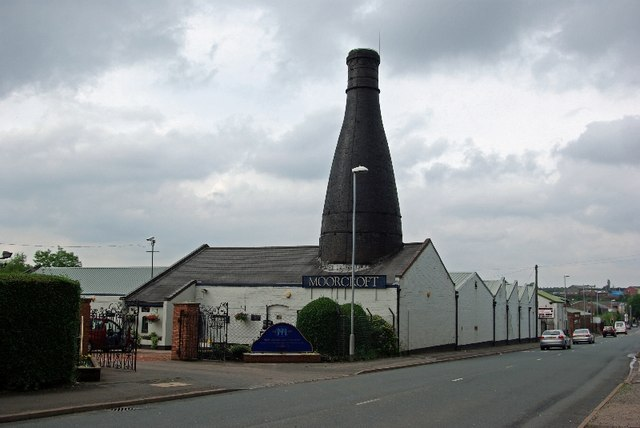
Moorcroft Pottery

Walter Moorcroft retired as the director of design in 1987, but continued to contribute until his last design, 'Rock of Ages', was launched in 1999. In 1993, 24-year-old Rachel Bishop joined the company as its senior designer. By claiming the original establishment of the Macintyre studio under William Moorcroft in 1897 as its own founding date, in 1997 Moorcroft celebrated its centenary. During 1998 it established a new Moorcroft Design Studio and employed several designers to extend the range of its products.

On 1 May 2025, Moorcroft announced it had stopped trading with the loss of 57 jobs. The firm blamed the rise in energy prices, stating their energy costs had gone up almost £250,000 over the past two years, with the additional pressures of carbon taxes and cheaper imports impacting their business. In June 2025 Will Moorcroft, grandson of William Moorcroft, acquired the company's assets, bringing the business back under the control of a member of the founding family for the first time since Walter Moorcroft's retirement in 2006, with Liberty regaining an interest as a backer of the takeover deal.

== Moorcroft pottery ==
Early in his employment at Macintyre's, William Moorcroft created designs for the company's Aurelian Ware range of high-Victorian pottery, which had transfer-printed and enamelled decoration in bold red, blue and gold colours. Introduced very soon afterwards, his Art Nouveau-influenced Florian Ware was decorated entirely by hand, with the design outlined in trailed slip using a technique known as tubelining. This technique was used in almost all of Moorcroft's subsequent art pottery, distinguishing it from mass-produced pottery. Both father and son also experimented with high-temperature flambé techniques, producing high glaze with vibrant colour.

Later Walter Moorcroft designs reflect the simpler appearance preferred during his era. Moorcroft Design Studio patterns show strong influences from the founding days of William Moorcroft coupled with the advances in colouring techniques of more recent years. Aimed at the luxury end of the collector and gift markets, they are generally in the form of such products as display plates, vases, pin dishes, lamp-bases and jars of varying shape and size.

== Gallery ==
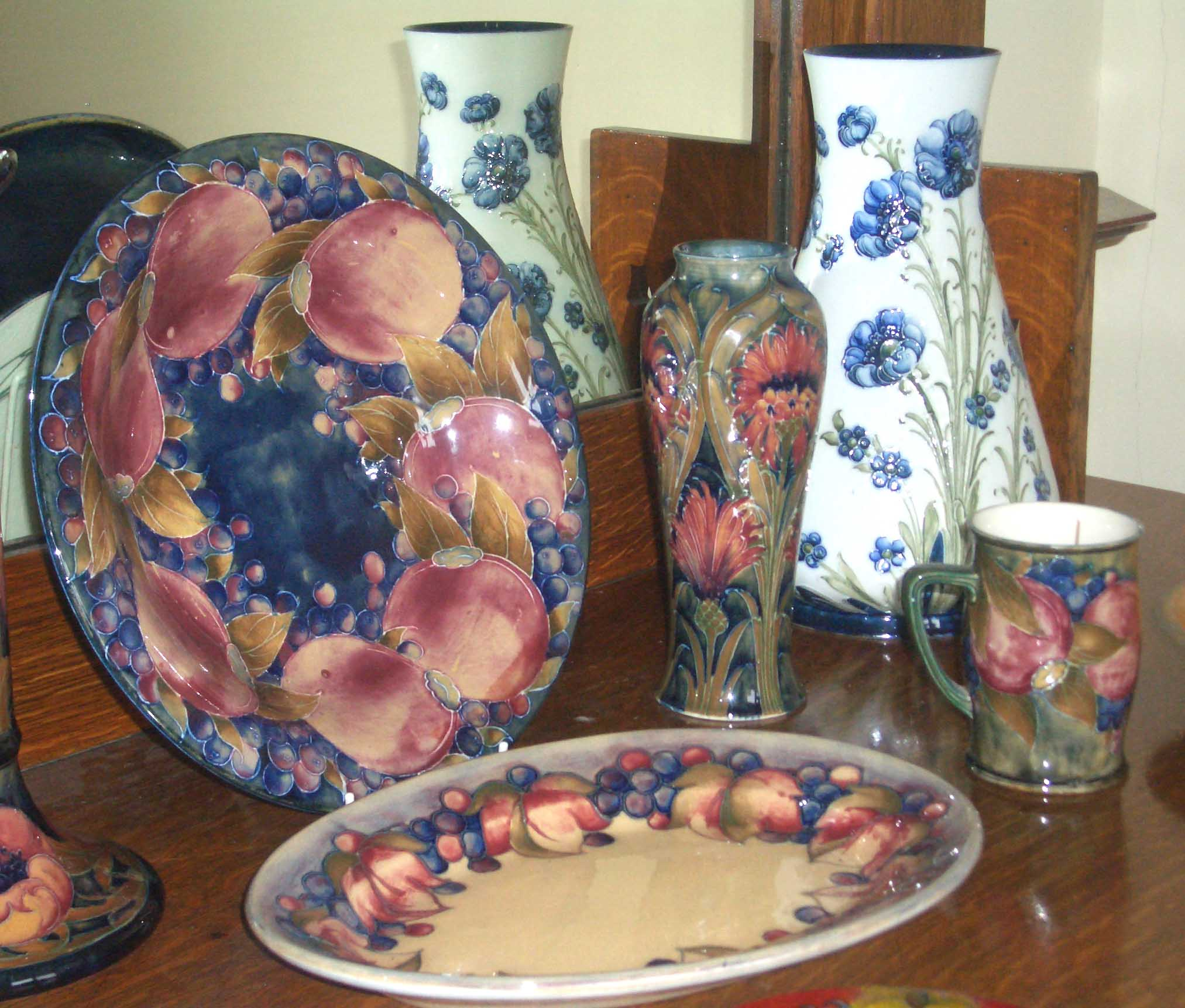
A group of William Moorcroft wares, 1913–1930s. In the centre is a tall "Florian" vase of the type first produced under Macintyre, with the later "Pomegranate" pattern on two plates and a mug.

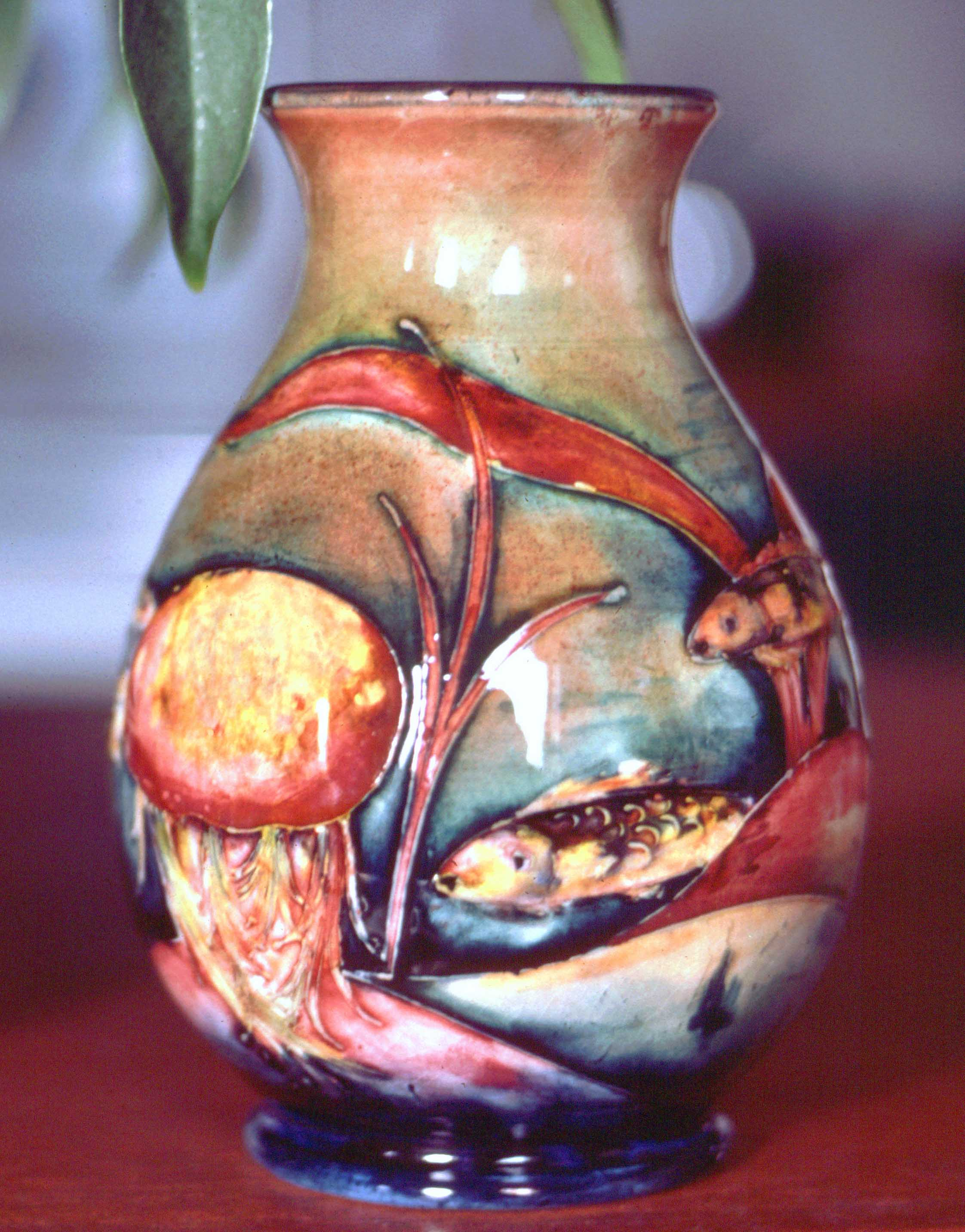
A William Moorcroft vase with fish and 'flambe' glaze, 1930s.

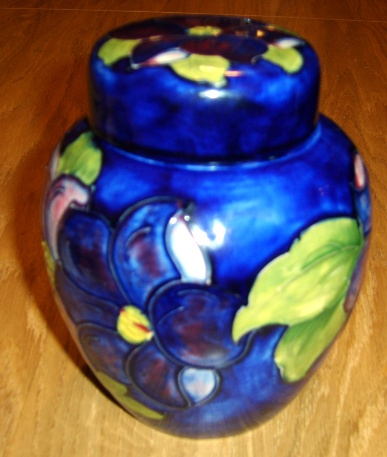
Moorcroft ginger jar, in 'Clematis' design.

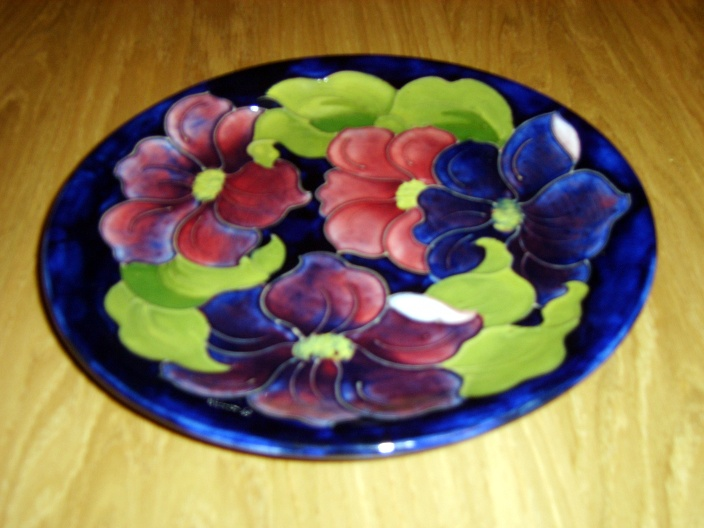
Moorcroft shallow dish, in 'Clematis' design.

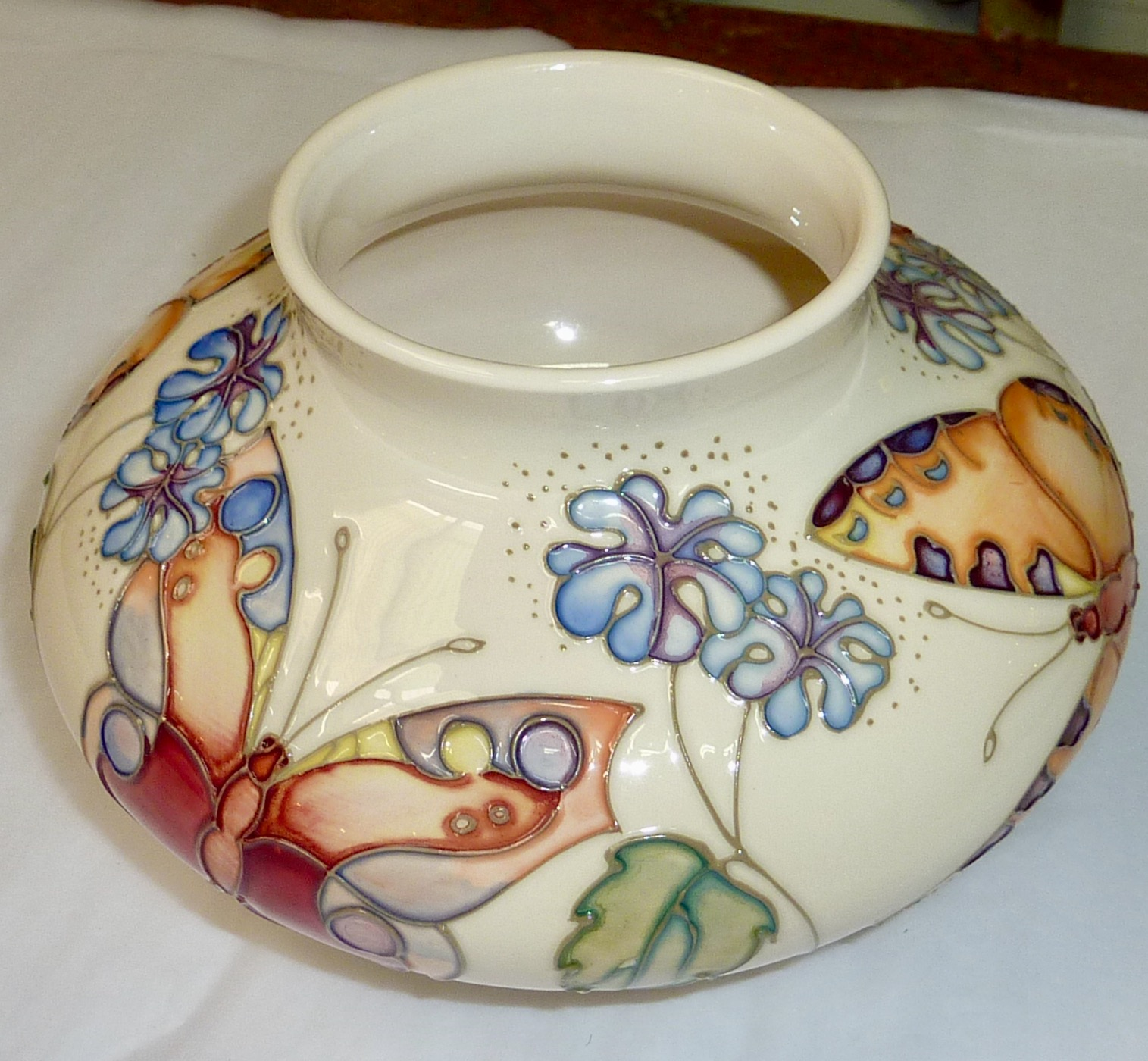
1990s Moorcroft vase

== See also ==
- Emma Bossons
