= Allan Blaze =

Guadeloupean footballer (born 1994)

Personal information
- Full name: Allan Junior Blaze
- Date of birth: 24 June 1994 (age 32)
- Place of birth: Petit-Bourg, Guadeloupe
- Height: 1.80 m (5 ft 11 in)
- Positions: Centre-back; left-back

Team information
- Current team: Nuova Sondrio
- Number: 33

Youth career
- –2012: Nancy
- 2012–2013: Genoa

Senior career*
Years	Team	Apps	(Gls)
2012	Nancy B	2	(0)
2012–2014	Genoa	0	(0)
2014–2015	Mantova	23	(0)
2015–2016	RapalloBogliasco	13	(0)
2016–2017	Trino		
2017–2020	Rende	83	(0)
2020–2021	Pro Vercelli	12	(0)
2022	Vibonese	9	(0)
2022–2024	Saint-Denis US		
2024	Acireale	6	(0)
2024–2025	Sancataldese	23	(0)
2025	CastrumFavara	0	(0)
2025–	Nuova Sondrio	1	(0)
- * Club domestic league appearances and goals as of 20:18, 16 November 2025 (UTC)

Allan Junior Blaze (born 24 June 1994) is a Guadeloupean footballer who plays as a centre-back or left-back for Serie D club Nuova Sondrio.

== Career ==
In 2012, Blaze signed for Italian Serie A side Genoa from the reserves of Nancy in the French Ligue 1.

In 2014, he signed for Italian third division club Mantova, where he made 23 league appearances and scored 0 goals.

In 2016, Blaze signed for Trino in the Italian fifth division from Italian fourth division team RapalloBogliasco.

In 2017, he signed for Rende in the Italian third division, where he made 83 league appearances and scored 0 goals.

In 2020, Blaze signed for Italian third division outfit Pro Vercelli after a trial.

On 13 January 2022, he signed with Serie C club Vibonese. After a spell at Saint-Denis Union Sports, Blaze returned to Italy, signing with Serie D team Acireale in July 2024. Only three months later, his contract with the club was terminated.

Only three days after leaving Acireale, Blaze signed with fellow league club Sancataldese. He left the club at the end of the 2024-25 season.

After a short spell at CastrumFavara, Blaze joined Serie D club Nuova Sondrio on 13 November 2025.
