= Alan Koch =

Alan Koch may refer to:

- Alan Koch (baseball) (1938–2015), American professional baseball player
- Alan Koch (soccer) (born 1975), South African and Canadian football/soccer coach
