= Allan Brown (Australian footballer) =

Australian rules footballer

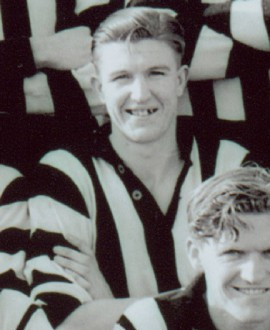
- Brown in 1945

Personal information
- Full name: Allan Anderson Brown
- Born: 15 November 1924
- Died: 9 June 2014 (aged 89)
- Original team: Fairfield / Northcote High School
- Height: 183 cm (6 ft 0 in)
- Weight: 78 kg (172 lb)

Playing career^{1}
| Years | Club | Games (Goals) |
| 1945–1946 | Collingwood | 16 (11) |
- ^{1} Playing statistics correct to the end of 1946.

Allan Anderson Brown (15 November 1924 – 9 June 2014) was an Australian rules footballer who played for the Collingwood Football Club in the Victorian Football League (VFL). His career ended prematurely due to a knee injury.
