= Alfred Anderson =

Alfred Anderson may refer to:

- Alfred Anderson (American football) (born 1961), former American football running back
- Alfred Anderson (entrepreneur) (1888–1956), Australian butcher and entrepreneur
- Alfred Anderson (pianist) (1848–1876), Australian pianist and composer
- Alfred Anderson (veteran) (1896–2005), Scottish joiner and veteran of the First World War
- C. Alfred "Chief" Anderson (1907–1996), American aviator, known as the father of black aviation
- Alf Anderson (1914–1985), baseball player
- Stanley Anderson (artist) (Alfred Stanley Anderson, 1884–1966), British engraver, etcher and watercolour painter

== See also ==
- Alfred O. Andersson (1874–1950), English-born American publisher
- Alf Andersen (footballer) (1891–1928), Norwegian footballer
- Alf Andersen (disambiguation)
- William Alfred Anderson, Canadian politician
- Al Anderson (disambiguation)
- Fred Anderson (disambiguation)
