= Allan Grant (footballer) =

Scottish footballer

Personal information
- Date of birth: 1 July 1973 (age 53)
- Place of birth: Glasgow, Scotland
- Position: Winger

Senior career*
Years	Team	Apps	(Gls)
1998–2002	Clyde	78	(62)
2003–2004	Stranraer	11	(12)
Total		88	(74)
- * Club domestic league appearances and goals

Allan Grant (born 1 July 1973) is a Scottish former professional footballer.

== Career ==
Grant began his career with junior side Maryhill. In the summer of 1998, he was part of the Junior revolution which swept through Clyde, being one of eleven players coming from the junior ranks to join the Bully Wee. He was a key figure in the team which won the Scottish Second Division championship in 2000.

In his final season at Clyde, he only played one game, due to injury. He left the club in the summer of 2002, and rejoined former club Maryhill. In 2003, he returned to the senior game for a season to join Stranraer. Grant then went back to Maryhill for a third spell before joining Bellshill athletic. Injuries forced him to retire from football in 2006.

== Honours ==
Clyde

- Scottish Second Division: 1999–2000

Stranraer

- Scottish Third Division: 2003–04
