= Alan Walker (disambiguation) =

Alan Walker (born 1997) is a Norwegian DJ and record producer.

Alan Walker may also refer to:

== Sportspeople ==
- Alan Walker (Australian sportsman) (1925–2005), Australian cricketer and rugby union player
- Alan Walker (footballer) (born 1959), English football defender
- Alan Walker (English cricketer) (born 1962), English cricketer

== Academics ==
- Alan Walker (musicologist) (born 1930), English academic and writer on music
- Alan Walker (anthropologist) (1938–2017), professor of anthropology and biology at Pennsylvania State University
- Alan Walker (social scientist) (born 1949), British professor of social policy and social gerontology at the University of Sheffield

== Other people ==
- Alan Cameron Walker (1865–1931), Australian architect
- Alan Walker (theologian) (1911–2003), Australian theologian and evangelist

== See also ==
- Allan Walker (disambiguation)
- Allen Walker, a fictional character from D.Gray-man manga and anime series
