= Allan Baldwin =

Australian rules footballer

Personal information
- Full name: Allan Leslie Baldwin
- Born: 9 February 1924; Ringwood, Victoria
- Died: 30 March 2008 (aged 84)
- Original team: Kilsyth
- Height: 187 cm (6 ft 2 in)
- Weight: 79 kg (174 lb)

Playing career^{1}
Years	Club	Games (Goals)
1949	Hawthorn	5 (0)
- ^{1} Playing statistics correct to the end of 1949.

Allan Leslie Baldwin (9 February 1924 – 30 March 2008) was an Australian rules footballer who played for the Hawthorn Football Club in the Victorian Football League (VFL).

== Personal life ==
Baldwin served as a signalman in the Australian Army during the Second World War.
