= Alan H. B. Wu =

American clinical chemist and toxicologist

- Occupation: Chemist; Toxicologist

Alan H. B. Wu is an American clinical chemist, toxicologist, professor, and author. He is known for his work in laboratory medicine, particularly in clinical chemistry, cardiac biomarkers, pharmacogenomics, and clinical toxicology. He is a professor of Laboratory Medicine at the University of California, San Francisco (UCSF), and Chief of Clinical Chemistry and Toxicology and Co-Core Lab Director at the Zuckerberg San Francisco General Hospital.

== Academic and professional career ==
In 1982, Wu began his academic career as assistant professor of Pathology and Laboratory Medicine at the University of Texas Health Science Center in Houston, where he served as Associate and then Director of Clinical Chemistry at Memorial Hermann Hospital.

After a decade in Texas, Wu left for a position at Hartford Hospital, where he served as Director of Clinical Chemistry and Professor of Laboratory Medicine at the University of Connecticut Health Center. He also held appointments as Professor of Pathobiology and Chemistry at the University of Connecticut, Storrs.

In 2004, Wu joined the faculty at the University of California, San Francisco as Professor of Laboratory Medicine and Director of Clinical Chemistry, Toxicology, and Pharmacogenomics at San Francisco General Hospital.

== Research ==
Wu's research has focused on cardiac biomarkers, clinical toxicology, point-of-care diagnostics, and pharmacogenomics. He has published over 550 peer-reviewed papers and co-authored multiple book chapters and clinical textbooks.

In the area of cardiac markers, he and his research group were among the first to evaluate the clinical value of cardiac troponin and the natriuretic peptides that are in widespread clinical use today.

He has been active on committees to standardize testing and has participated in the creation and authorship of clinical practice guidelines for cardiac markers. More recently, he has conducted research on biomarkers for traumatic brain injury and contributed a textbook on this topic.

His group was among the first clinical labs to initiate untargeted identifications using exact molecular formula.

During the COVID-19 pandemic, Wu suspended his normal research work to conduct laboratory-based studies on SARS-CoV-2 molecular, antigen and antibody testing.

In addition to his scientific publications, Wu is the author of eight books of short stories designed to raise public awareness of laboratory medicine. His stories are based on real cases, where the and aim to depict the behind-the-scenes role of lab professionals in patient care. He has also launched a social media campaign to educate the general public as to the value of the clinical laboratory. His advocacy stresses that clinical labs are essential in both diagnosis and long-term health management, especially in emergency settings and public health crises.

He has advocated for better media representation of clinical laboratories and is developing a television drama series centered on a clinical laboratory director and his team of scientists solving medical cases using diagnostic tools.

He has drawn comparisons between the potential impact of a lab-focused TV show and the forensic science popularity surge following programs such as CSI and NCIS.
