= Alan Brown (cricketer, born 1933) =

English cricketer

Personal information
- Full name: Alan Brown
- Born: 1 April 1933; Seaton Delaval, Northumberland, England
- Died: 23 August 2013 (aged 80); Fenham, Northumberland, England
- Batting: Right-handed
- Bowling: Right-arm medium

Domestic team information
- Years: Team
- 1975: Minor Counties North
- 1958–1979: Northumberland

Career statistics
Competition	List A
Matches	7
Runs scored	24
Batting average	4.80
100s/50s	–/–
Top score	9
Balls bowled	350
Wickets	5
Bowling average	29.60
5 wickets in innings	–
10 wickets in match	–
Best bowling	3/21
Catches/stumpings	2/–
- Source: Cricinfo, 30 June 2011

Alan Brown (1 April 1933 - 23 August 2013) was an English cricketer. Brown was a right-handed batsman who bowled right-arm medium pace. He was born in Seaton Delaval, Northumberland.

Brown made his debut for Northumberland in the 1958 Minor Counties Championship against Cumberland. Brown played Minor counties cricket for Northumberland from 1958 to 1979, which included 133 Minor Counties Championship matches. He made his List A debut for Northumberland against Lincolnshire in the 1971 Gillette Cup. He made 2 further List A appearances for the county, against Bedfordshire and Somerset, both in the 1977 Gillette Cup. In his 3 List A matches for the county, he took 2 wickets at an average of 41.50, with best figures of 2/26.

Playing for Northumberland allowed him to represent Minor Counties North, who he made his debut for in the 1974 Benson & Hedges Cup against Yorkshire. He made 3 further List A appearances for the team in that competition, the last of which came against Nottinghamshire. In his 4 matches for the team, he took 3 wickets at an average of 21.66, with best figures of 3/21.
