= Alan Brown (cricketer, born 1957) =

English cricketer (born 1957)

Personal information
- Born: 23 December 1957 (age 68); Darwen, Lancashire
- Batting: Right-handed
- Role: Wicket-keeper

Career statistics
Competition	First-class	List A
Matches	1	1
Runs scored	–	–
Batting average	–	–
100s/50s	–	–
Top score	–	-
Catches/stumpings	2/0	3/0
- Source: Cricinfo, 14 April 2023

Alan Brown (born 23 December 1957) is a former English cricketer who played one first-class and one List A match for Worcestershire as a wicketkeeper in 1979. He was born in Darwen, Lancashire.

His first-team career lasted four days: his only first-class match was a three-day affair against Oxford University, and on the Sunday that fell between the first and second days of that game he appeared in a John Player League match against Middlesex after standing in for David Humphries who was injured three quarters of an hour beforehand. Worcestershire declared twice against the students and were not bowled out against Middlesex, so Brown did not get a bat. He did, however, hold five catches over the two games.

Brown played for several years (1976–1979) at Second XI level, making two half-centuries in 49 innings. He also played one minor game against Ireland in 1979.
