= Allan M. Findlay =

British geographer

Allan Mackay Findlay FRSE is a British geographer. Findlay is a population geographer and Emeritus Professor in the School of Geography and Sustainable Development at the University of St Andrews.

Findlay earned his doctorate from Durham University. Between 1994 and 2011 he was Professor of Geography at the University of Dundee, and has also held visiting positions at the International Labour Office in Geneva, the Chinese University of Hong Kong and the University of Umea.

He was editor of the journal Population, Space and Place from 2003 to 2016.
