= Alan Jacobs (academic) =

American scholar (born 1958)

- Born: August 28, 1958 (age 68); United States

Academic background
- Education: University of Alabama (BA); University of Virginia (PhD)

Academic work
- Discipline: Literature
- Sub-discipline: English literature
- Institutions: Wheaton College; Baylor University
- Website: ayjay.org

Alan Jacobs (born 1958) is a scholar of English literature and a literary critic. He is a distinguished professor of the humanities in the honors program at Baylor University.

== Early life and education ==
Jacobs earned a Bachelor of Arts degree from the University of Alabama in 1980 and a Doctor of Philosophy from the University of Virginia in 1987.

== Career ==
Jacobs was the Clyde S. Kilby chair professor of English at Wheaton College (Illinois) until 2012 when he was hired as the distinguished professor of humanities in the honors program at Baylor.

In addition to his academic work and books, Jacobs has been a regular contributor to magazines including The Atlantic, First Things, and The New Atlantis.

== Personal life ==
Jacobs is an evangelical Anglican.

== Books ==
- Breaking Bread with the Dead: A Reader's Guide to a More Tranquil Mind (Penguin Press, 2020)
- The Year of Our Lord 1943: Christian Humanism in an Age of Crisis (Oxford, 2018)
- How to Think: A Survival Guide for a World at Odds (Currency, 2017)
- "The Book of Common Prayer": A Biography (Lives of Great Religious Books, Princeton, 2013)
- The Pleasures of Reading in an Age of Distraction (Oxford, 2011)
- Wayfaring: Essays Pleasant and Unpleasant (Eerdmans, 2010)
- Original Sin: A Cultural History (HarperOne, 2008)
- Looking Before and After: Testimony and the Christian Life (Eerdmans, 2008)
- The Narnian: The Life and Imagination of C. S. Lewis (Harper, 2005)
- Shaming the Devil: Essays in Truthtelling (Eerdmans, 2004)
- Must Christianity Be Violent? Reflections on History, Practice, and Theology (ed. with Kenneth R. Chase, Brazos Press, 2003)
- A Theology of Reading: The Hermeneutics of Love (Westview Press, 2001)
- A Visit to Vanity Fair: Moral Essays on the Present Age (Brazos Press, 2001)
- What Became of Wystan? Change and Continuity in Auden's Poetry (University of Arkansas, 1998)
