= Alan Brown (British Army officer) =

British Army officer (1909–1971)

Brigadier Alan Brown CBE DSO MC
- Born: 8 July 1909; Littlehampton, West Sussex, England
- Died: 1 September 1971 (aged 62); High Hurstwood, Sussex, England
- Military career
- Allegiance: United Kingdom
- Branch: British Army
- Service years: 1930–1958
- Rank: Brigadier
- Service number: 44827
- Unit: Royal Tank Regiment
- Commands: 147th Regiment Royal Armoured Corps; 3rd Royal Tank Regiment; 31st Armoured Brigade; Specialised Armour Development Establishment; 25th Armoured Brigade
- Conflicts: Mohmand campaign of 1935; Second World War
- Awards: Commander of the Order of the British Empire; Companion of the Distinguished Service Order; Military Cross; Chevalier of the Order of Leopold with Palm; Croix de guerre

Brigadier Alan Ward Brown CBE DSO MC (8 July 1909 – 1 September 1971) was a British Army tank officer of the Second World War.

== Military career ==
Brown was educated at Bromsgrove School and the Royal Military College, Sandhurst, before being commissioned into the Royal Tank Corps (later the Royal Tank Regiment) on 30 January 1930. He served with the 5th Battalion until 1931, and then he served with the 2nd Armoured Car Company in India until 1935. He fought in the Mohmand campaign of 1935, during which he was awarded the Military Cross. Brown then served in the 2nd Battalion RTC until 1939.

Following the outbreak of the Second World War in September 1939, Brown attended a shortened course at the Staff College, Camberley from January to April 1940. Following this, he served in a variety of high level staff positions until late October 1942 when he was assigned to Major-General Percy Hobart's 79th Armoured Division as its General Staff Officer Grade 1 (GSO1). In August 1943 he became Commanding Officer (CO) of the 147th Regiment Royal Armoured Corps. He served in France following the Normandy landings and until April 1945 was CO of the 3rd Royal Tank Regiment. He then became commander of the 31st Armoured Brigade. In February 1945 he was awarded the Distinguished Service Order.

From 1948 to 1949 Brown was the Commandant of the Specialised Armour Development Establishment, and between 1953 and 1956 was the commander of the 25th Armoured Brigade. In 1955, he was made a Commander of the Order of the British Empire, and he retired with the rank of brigadier on 10 July 1958.
