= Alan Moorcroft =

British philatelist

Alan Moorcroft FRPSL is a past President of the Royal Philatelic Society London.

He is also a member of the National Philatelic Society and the Channel Islands Specialists Society.
