= Alan Brown (footballer, born 1937) =

English footballer (1937–2016)

Personal information
- Full name: Alan Brown
- Date of birth: 11 December 1937
- Place of birth: Lewes, England
- Date of death: 12 February 2016 (aged 78)
- Place of death: Lewes, England
- Height: 6 ft 2 in (1.88 m)
- Position: Centre forward

Senior career*
Years	Team	Apps	(Gls)
- Lewes St Mary's
- Portslade
1958–1962	Brighton & Hove Albion	7	(2)
1962	Exeter City	11	(3)
1962–196?	Hastings United		
- Dover
- * Club domestic league appearances and goals

Alan Brown (11 December 1937 – 12 February 2016) was an English professional footballer who played as a centre forward in the Football League for Brighton & Hove Albion and Exeter City. He also played non-league football for Lewes St Mary's, Portslade, Hastings United and Dover.

== Life and career ==
Brown was born in 1937 in Lewes, Sussex, one of six brothers who all played football; two, Irvin and Stan, also played in the Football League. He played local football for Lewes St Mary's and Portslade before being called up for National Service. A tall, heavily built man, Brown was serving in Gibraltar in March 1958 when he was recommended to Brighton & Hove Albion as a promising centre half; he signed for the club six months later, the day after his brother Irvin, also a centre half, left it. He made his first-team debut three years later, by which time he had converted to play at centre forward, and made eight appearances, scoring twice, in the first half of the 1961–62 Second Division season. In January 1962, he joined Exeter City, managed by former Brighton team-mate Glen Wilson. He scored three goals from eleven Division Four appearances, and left at the end of the season for non-league football with clubs including Hastings United and Dover. After football, Brown worked as a landscape gardener. He died in Lewes in 2016 at the age of 78.
