= Alain (given name) =

Alain (French: [alɛ̃]) is widely used as a personal name and is the French form of Alan but also exists in English-speaking countries:

== A ==
- Alain Absire (born 1950), French writer
- Alain Acard (1951–2023), French sprint canoeist
- Alain Alivon (born 1965), French military and drill instructor
- Alain Altinoglu (born 1975), French-Armenian conductor
- Alain Ambrosino (born 1951), French rally driver
- Alain Amougou (born 1973), Cameroonian footballer
- Alain Anderton, British author of business studies and economics textbooks
- Alain Anen (born 1950), Luxembourgish fencer
- Alain Andji (born 1974), French pole vaulter
- Alain André, Canadian politician and a City Councillor in Montreal, Quebec
- Alain Anziani (born 1951), member of the Senate of France, representing the Gironde department
- Alain Aoun (born 1971), Lebanese politician
- Alain Arroyo (born 1982), Spanish footballer and manager
- Alain Aspect (born 1947), French physicist
- Alain Akouala Atipault (born 1959), Congolese politician
- Alain Attalah (born 1964), Egyptian basketball player
- Alain Auderset (born 1968), Swiss Christian author of comic books
- Alain Ayissi (born 1962), Cameroonian cyclist
- Alain Ayroles (born 1968), French author, playwright, screenwriter, and translator

== B ==
- Alain Baclet (born 1986), French footballer
- Alain Badiou (born 1937), French philosopher
- Alain Bailey (born 1987), Jamaican long jumper
- Alain Bancquart (1934–2022), French composer
- Alain Baraton (born 1957), French gardener
- Alain Baroja (born 1989), Venezuelan football goalkeeper
- Alain Barrau (1947–2021), French politician
- Alain Barrière (1935–2019), French singer
- Alain Barudoni (born 1940), Swiss fencer
- Alain Bashung (1947–2009), French singer, songwriter and actor
- Alain Bauer, (born 1962), French criminologist
- Alain Baumann (born 1966), Swiss footballer
- Alain Baxter (born 1973), Scottish professional skier
- Alain Beaulé (born 1946), Canadian ice hockey player
- Alain Bédé (born 1970), Ivorian footballer
- Alain Behi (born 1978), French-Ivorian football player
- Alain Bélanger, Canadian professional hockey player
- Alain J. P. Belda, Chairman of the Board of Alcoa since January 2001
- Alain Bellemare (born 1962), Canadian businessman
- Alain Bellouis (born 1947), French cyclist
- Alain Benoit (born 1948), French physicist
- Alain Bensoussan (born 1940), French mathematician
- Alain Berbérian (1953–2017), French-Armenian film director and writer
- Alain Bergala (born 1943), French film critic, essayist, screenwriter, and director
- Alain Berger (born 1990), Swiss ice hockey player
- Alain Berger (orienteer), Swiss orienteering competitor
- Alain Bergeron (born 1950), Canadian science fiction author and political scientist
- Alain Berliner (born 1963), Belgian director best known for the 1997 film Ma vie en rose
- Alain Bernard (born 1983), French swimmer from Aubagne, Bouches-du-Rhône
- Alain Bernaud (1932–2020), French composer
- Alain Bernheim (1922–2009), French-American film producer and literary agent
- Alain Bernheim (1931–2022), French musician and Masonic researcher
- Alain Berset (born 1972), President of the Swiss Council of States
- Alain Bertaud, French urban planner and author
- Alain Bertrand (1951–2020), French politician
- Alain Bieri (born 1979), Swiss professional football referee
- Alain Billiet (born 1951), the alleged designer of the euro sign (€)
- Alain Blanchard (died 1419), commander of the crossbowmen of Touent during the Hundred Years' War
- Alain Blondel (born 1939), retired French art dealer
- Alain Blondel (born 1962), retired French decathlete
- Alain Bocquet (born 1946), member of the National Assembly of France
- Alain Boghossian (born 1970), retired Armenian-French football player
- Alain Boire (born 1971), Canadian politician
- Alain Bombard (1924–2005), French biologist, physician and politician
- Alain Bondue (born 1959), France cyclist
- Alain Boublil, librettist who worked with the composer Claude-Michel Schönberg
- Alain Bouchard, Canadian businessman
- Jean-Alain Boumsong (born 1979), Cameroonian professional football defender
- Alain Bravo, French electrical engineer and entrepreneur
- Alain Brunet, French scholar

== C ==
- Alain Cacheux (1947–2020), member of the National Assembly of France
- Alain Calmat (born 1940), French former competitive figure skater, surgeon, and politician
- Alain Cantareil (born 1983), French footballer
- Alain Caron (1938–1986), Canadian professional ice hockey player
- Alain Caron (born 1955), Canadian jazz musician and bass player
- Alain F. Carpentier (born 1933), French heart surgeon
- Alain Casanova (born 1961), football former goalkeeper and manager
- Alain Cavalier (born 1931), French film director
- Alain Caveglia (born 1968), French football retired striker
- Alain Cayzac (born 1941), French advertising agent
- Alain Chabat (born 1958), French Jewish actor and director
- Alain Chamfort (born 1949), French singer of Breton origin
- Alain Chapel (1937–1990), French Michelin 3 starred chef
- Alain Chartier (1392–1430), French poet and political writer
- Michel-Eustache-Gaspard-Alain Chartier de Lotbinière (1748–1822), seigneur and political figure in Lower Canada
- Alain Chatillon (born 1943), member of the Senate of France
- Alain Chevrier (born 1961), retired Canadian ice hockey goaltender
- Alain Claeys (born 1948), member of the National Assembly of France
- Alain Clark (born 1979), Dutch musician and producer
- Alain Colmerauer (1941–2017), French computer scientist
- Alain Colombe (born 1949), French retired slalom canoeist
- Alain Connes (born 1947), French mathematician
- Alain Corbin, French historian, specialist of the 19th century in France
- Alain Corneau (1943–2010), French movie director and writer
- Alain Côté (born 1957), professional ice hockey player for the Quebec Nordiques
- Alain Côté (born 1967), former professional ice hockey player and Roller Hockey player
- Alain Couriol (born 1958), former French football striker
- Alain Courtois (born 1951), Belgian politician
- Alain Cousin (born 1947), member of the National Assembly of France
- Marie-Alain Couturier (1897–1954), French Dominican friar, designer of stained glass windows
- Alain Cudini (born 1946), French former racing driver
- Alain Cuny (1908–1994), French actor

== D ==
- Alain Daigle (born 1954), former professional ice hockey forward
- Alain Daniélou (1907–1994), French historian, intellectual, musicologist, Indologist, and convert to Shaivite Hinduism
- Alain de Benoist (born 1943), French academic, philosopher, founder of the Nouvelle Droite
- Alain de Boissieu (1914–2006), French general, son-in-law of general Charles de Gaulle
- Alain de Botton, (born 1969), British writer and television producer
- Alain de Cadenet (1945–2022), on-air personality for the SPEED Channel and ESPN
- Alain de Changy (1922–1994), Belgian racing driver
- Alain de Coëtivy (1407–1474), prelate from a Breton noble family
- Alain Emmanuel de Coëtlogon (1646–1730), Marshal of France during the reign of Louis XIV and Louis XV
- Alain Huetz de Lemps, French geographer and botanist
- Alain de Lille (1128–1202), French theologian and poet
- Alain de Martigny (born 1946), French football manager and former player
- Alain de Mijolla (1933–2019), French psychoanalyst and psychiatrist
- Alain de Rothschild (1910–1982), French banker and philanthropist
- Alain de Royer-Dupré (born 1944), French racehorse trainer
- Alain de Solminihac (1593–1659), French Catholic religious reformer and bishop of Cahors
- Alain-Philippe Malagnac d'Argens de Villèle (1951–2000), the adopted son of French writer Roger Peyrefitte
- Alain Decaux (1925–2016), French historian
- Alain Defossé (1957–2017), French novelist and translator
- Alain Delon (1935–2024), César Award-winning French actor
- Alain Demurger, modern French historian, specialist of the history of the Knights Templar and the Crusades
- Alain Deneef, Belgian businessman
- Alain Desrosières, French statistician at the INSEE and a sociologist and historian of science at the EHESS
- Alain Destexhe, Belgian liberal politician
- Alain Desvergnes (1931–2020), French photographer
- Alain Digbeu (born 1975), French professional basketball player
- Alain Dorval (1946–2024), French voice actor born in Algiers
- Alain Dostie (born 1943), Canadian cinematographer, film director and screenwriter
- Alain Dubuc, Canadian journalist and an economist
- Alain Ducasse (born 1956), Monégasque chef
- Alain Dufaut (born 1944), member of the Senate of France, representing the Vaucluse department
- Alain Duhamel (born 1940), French journalist and political commentator

== E ==
- Alain Ehrenberg (born 1950), French sociologist
- Alain Michel Ekoue (born 1982), Cameroonian football player
- Alain Elkann (born 1950), Italian novelist and journalist of Jewish descent
- Alain Enthoven (born 1930), Deputy Assistant Secretary of Defense from 1961 to 1965
- Alain Escoffier (1949–1977), French anti-communist activist and martyr
- Alain Etchegoyen (1951–2007), French philosopher and novelist
- Alain Eyobo (born 1961), retired Cameroonian professional football forward
- Alain Erlande-Brandenburg (1937–2020), French art historian and archivist

== F ==
- Jean-Alain Fanchone (born 1988), French footballer
- Alain Fauconnier (born 1945), French politician and a member of the Senate of France
- Alain Ferry (politician) (born 1952), member of the National Assembly of France
- Alain Ferté (born 1955), French professional racing driver
- Alain Figaret, French luxury shirt brand launched in 1968 by Alain Figaret
- Alain Filhol (born 1951), French racing driver
- Alain Finkielkraut (born 1949), French essayist, and son of a Jewish Polish artisan
- Alain Fouché (born 1942), French politician and a member of the Senate of France
- Alain Fournier (1943–2000), computer graphics researcher
- Alain Frachon (born 1950), French journalist

== G ==
- Alain Bernat Gallego (born 1971), Andorran politician
- Alain Garant (born 1952), Liberal party member of the Canadian House of Commons
- Alain Gaspoz (born 1970), Beninese football player who, is playing for FC Bagnes
- Alain Geiger (born 1960), retired Swiss international football defender and current manager
- Alain Gerbault (1893–1941), French aviator, tennis champion and sailor
- Alain Gest (born 1950), French politician
- Alain Gheerbrant (1920–2013), French writer, editor, poet and explorer
- Alain Giletti (born 1939), French figure skater
- Alain Gilles (1945–2014), French professional basketball player and coach
- Alain Giresse (born 1952), French professional football (soccer) midfielder
- Alain Glavieux (1949–2004), French professor in electrical engineering
- Alain Goma (born 1972), former football player
- Alain Goraguer (1931–2023), French jazz pianist, sideman of Boris Vian and Serge Gainsbourg, arranger and composer
- Alain Gottvallès (1942–2008), French swimmer, born in Morocco
- Alain Gouaméné (born 1966), former football goalkeeper from Côte d'Ivoire
- Alain Gournac (born 1943), French politician and a member of the Senate of France
- Alain Grandbois, CC (1900–1975), Quebecer poet born in Saint-Casimir, Quebec
- Alain Guionnet (born 1954), French revisionist and a left-wing activist

== H ==
- Alain Haché (born 1970), experimental physicist and associate professor at the University of Moncton, Canada
- Alain Hamer (born 1965), Luxembourgish football referee
- Alain Héroux (born 1964), former professional ice hockey left winger
- Alain Hertoghe (born 1959), Belgian journalist who worked for the French Catholic newspaper La Croix
- Alain Houpert (born 1957), French politician and a member of the Senate of France
- Alain Hutchinson (born 1949), Belgian politician and Member of the European Parliament

== J ==
- Alain Jacquet (1939–2008), French artist representative of the American Pop Art movement
- Alain Jessua (1932–2017), French film director and screenwriter
- Alain Johannes (born 1962), guitarist and member of the band Eleven
- Alain Johns, fictional gunslinger in Stephen King's Dark Tower series of novels
- Alain Joly, French businessman
- Alain Joyandet (born 1954), French politician
- Alain Juppé (born 1945), French right-wing politician, Prime Minister of France from 1995 to 1997

== K ==
- Alain Kashama (born 1979), professional Canadian football player
- Alain Muana Kizamba (born 1980), goalkeeper from the Democratic Republic of the Congo
- Alain Koffi (born 1983), French professional basketball player
- Alain Koudou (born 1984), Ivorian football striker
- Alain Krivine (1941–2022), leader of the Trotskyist movement in France

== L ==
- Alain Lamassoure (born 1944), French politician and Member of the European Parliament
- Alain Lambert (born 1946), French politician
- Alain Laurier (1944–2023), French football manager and player
- Alain Le Boulluec (born 1941), contemporary French patristics scholar
- Alain Le Bussy (1947–2010), prolific Belgian author of science fiction
- Alain Le Vern (born 1948), French Socialist Senator, president of the Haute-Normandie region
- Alain Lebas (born 1953), French sprint canoeist
- Alain Paul Lebeaupin (1945–2021), French Archbishop
- Alain Lefebvre (born 1960), French entrepreneur and author
- Alain Lefèvre (born 1962), Québécois pianist and composer
- Alain Lemercier (born 1957), retired male race walker from France
- Alain Lemieux (born 1962), retired ice hockey player
- Alain Lequeux (1947–2006), French jockey
- Alain-René Lesage (1668–1747), French novelist and playwright
- Alain Lestié (born 1944), French painter and writer
- Alain A. Lewis (born 1947), American mathematician
- Alain Lipietz (born 1947), French engineer, economist, politician, member of the French Green Party
- Alain Liri (born 1979), Côte d'Ivoire footballer
- Alain Locke (1885–1954), American writer, philosopher, educator, and patron of the arts
- Alain Lombard (born 1940), French conductor

== M ==
- Alain Mabanckou (born 1966), author and journalist
- Alain Maca, retired American soccer defender, President of the JFK International Air Terminal
- Alain Madelin (born 1946), French politician and former minister
- Alain Mafart, French military officer
- Alain Maline (1947–2025), French film director, producer, and screenwriter
- Alain Mamou-Mani, French film producer and writer
- Alain Manesson Mallet (1630–1706), French cartographer and engineer
- Alain Marc (born 1957), member of the National Assembly of France
- Alain Marion (1938–1998), French flautist
- Alain Marleix (born 1946), Secretary of State for Veterans in the government of François Fillon from 2007 to 2008
- Alain Marty (born 1946), member of the National Assembly of France
- Alain Masudi (born 1978), Congolese football player
- Alain Maury (born 1958), French astronomer
- Alain Menu (born 1963), Swiss racing driver
- Alain Merchadier (born 1952), French retired professional football defender
- Alain Mesili (born 1949), political activist in France during the 1968 disturbances
- Alain Meslet (born 1950), French professional road bicycle racer
- Alain Meunier (born 1942), French cellist
- Alain Michel (football manager) (born 1948), French football coach, amateur goalkeeper, assistant professor, and manager
- Alain Mikli (born 1955), French designer of high-end handmade eyeglasses and accessories
- Alain Milon (born 1947), member of the Senate of France
- Alain Mimoun (1921–2013), French Olympic marathon champion
- Alain Moizan (born 1953), French retired professional football midfielder
- Alain Moka (born 1954), Congolese politician
- Alain Moyne-Bressand (born 1945), member of the National Assembly of France

== N ==
- Alain Nasreddine (born 1975), professional ice hockey defenceman
- Alain Ndizeye (born 1986), Burundian football defender
- Alain Ndjoubi Ossami, Gabonese politician and economist
- Alain Nef (born 1982), Swiss football defender
- Alain Néri (born 1942), member of the National Assembly of France
- Alain Ngalani (born 1975), Cameroonian two-time Muay Thai kickboxing world champion
- Alain Nkong (born 1979), Cameroonian football midfielder

== O ==
- Alain Junior Ollé Ollé (born 1987), Cameroonian professional footballer

== P ==
- Alain Paquet (born 1961), Canadian politician, teacher and economist
- Alain Pasquier (born 1942), French art historian specialising in ancient Greek art, museography and conservation
- Alain Pâris (born 1947), French conductor and musicologist
- Alain Passard (born 1956), French chef and owner of the three star restaurant L'Arpège in Paris
- Alain Payet (1947–2007), French director of Nazi exploitation and chic porn movies
- Alain Pellegrini (born 1946), French général de Division
- Alain Perrin (born 1956), French football manager and former footballer
- Alain Peyrefitte (1925–1999), French scholar and politician
- Alain Poher (1909–1996), French centrist politician
- Alain Pointet (1957–2002), French sailor who represented his country at the Olympics crew member in the Soling
- Alain Poiré (1917–2000), French film producer and screenwriter
- Alain Polaniok (1958–2005), French footballer who played as a midfielder
- Alain Pons (born 1995), Gibraltarian footballer
- Alain Pompidou (born 1942), French scientist and politician
- Alain Portes (born 1961), French handball player
- Alain Portmann (born 1981), Swiss football goalkeeper
- Alain Prost (born 1955), French racing driver; Four Time Formula One World Champion
- Alain Provost, French Landscape Architect

== R ==
- Alain Raguel (born 1976), French football player
- Alain Rakotondramanana (born 1970), Malagasy footballer
- Alain Ramadier (born 1958), French politician
- Alain Rayes (born 1971), Canadian politician
- Alain Razahasoa (born 1966), Malagasy long-distance runner
- Alain Rémond (born 1946), French humor columnist
- Alain Renoir (1921–2008), French-American writer and literature professor, son of filmmaker Jean Renoir and actress Catherine Hessling
- Alain Resnais (1922–2014), French New Wave film director
- Alain Rey (1928–2020), French linguist, lexicographer and radio personality
- Alain Rey (born 1982), Swiss ski mountaineer
- Alain Richard (born 1945), French politician
- Alain Richard (born 1985), Swiss ski mountaineer
- Alain Robbe-Grillet (1922–2008), French writer and filmmaker
- Alain Robert (born 1962), French rock and urban climber
- Alain Robidoux (born 1960), Canadian snooker player
- Alain Roca (born 1976), retired volleyball player from Cuba
- Alain Rochat (born 1983), Swiss footballer
- Alain Roche (footballer), former French football defender
- Alain Rohr (born 1971), Swiss athlete who specializes in the 400 metres hurdles
- Alain Rolland (born 1966), former Irish rugby union footballer and current international referee
- Alain Romans (1905–1988), French jazz composer
- Alain Rousset (born 1951), the Socialist president of the Aquitaine region of France

== S ==
- Alain Sailhac, Executive Vice President and Dean Emeritus at the French Culinary Institute in New York City
- Alain Saint-Ogan (1895–1974), French comics author and artist
- Alain Sarde (born 1952), French film producer and actor
- Alain Sars (born 1961), retired French professional football referee
- Alain Sarteur (born 1946), French former athlete
- Alain Savary (1918–1988), French Socialist politician
- Alain Schmitt (born 1983), French judoka
- Alain Schultz (born 1983), Swiss association footballer
- Alain Senderens, leading French chef credited as one of the founders of Nouvelle Cuisine
- Alain Sergile, Haitian swimmer who lived in Roswell, Georgia
- Alain Silver, US film and music producer, and reviewer, historian and writer on film topics, especially film noir and horror films
- Alain Simard (businessman), President and CEO of L'Équipe Spectra since its inception in 1977
- Alain Soral (born 1958), French sociologist, essayist, and film maker, as well as being the author of several polemical essays
- Alain Souchon (born 1944), French singer, songwriter and actor
- Alain Suguenot (born 1951), member of the National Assembly of France
- Alain Suied (1951–2008), French poet and translator
- Alain Supiot (born 1949), French legal scholar
- Alain Sutter (born 1968), Swiss football player
- Alain Sylvestre (born 1979), professional Canadian kickboxer
- Alain Succar (born 1990), professional F&B consultancy

== T ==
- Alain Tabourian, Lebanese politician of Armenian origin
- Alain Tanner (1929–2022), Swiss film director
- Alain Taravella (born 1948), French billionaire
- Alain Tardif (born 1946), Liberal party member of the Canadian House of Commons
- Alain Therrien (born 1966), Canadian politician
- Alain Touraine (1925–2023), French sociologist born in Hermanville-sur-Mer
- Alain Touwaide (born 1953), Belgian historian of medicine and sciences currently researching at the Smithsonian Institution, Washington D. C.
- Alain Traoré (born 1988), Burkinabé football (soccer) midfielder
- Alain Trudel (born 1966), Canadian musician, composer and conductor
- Alain Turnier, Haitian historian

== V ==
- Alain Vanzo (1928–2002), French opera singer and composer
- Alain Vasselle (born 1947), member of the Senate of France representing the Oise department
- Alain Vasseur (born 1948), French professional road bicycle racer
- Alain Viala (1947–2021), professor of French Literature at the University of Oxford and the University of Paris III
- Alain Vidalies (born 1951), member of the National Assembly of France
- Alain Vigneault (born 1961), the head coach of the Vancouver Canucks of the NHL
- Alain Vivien (born 1938), French Socialist Party (PS) politician

== W ==
- Alain Weill (born 1946), French art critic, expert in graphic design and advertising
- Alain Wertheimer (1949), French businessman who owns a controlling interest in the House of Chanel with his brother Gerard
- Alain Whyte (pronounced Alan) (born 1967), English guitarist, singer, and songwriter
- Alain Wicki (born 1962), Swiss skeleton racer
- Alain Williams (born 1954), British sprint canoeist

== Y ==
- Alain Bédouma Yoda (born 1951), Burkinabé politician and Minister of State for Foreign Affairs and Regional Cooperation
- Alain Yzermans (born 1967), Belgian politician

== Z ==
- Alain Zoubga (born 1953), medical doctor and politician in Burkina Faso

== Other ==
- Alain, bishop of Auxerre (died 1185), Cistercian abbot and bishop of Auxerre from 1152 to 1167
- Alain I of Albret (1440–1522), powerful French aristocrat
- Alain-Fournier (1886–1914), the pseudonym of Henri Alban-Fournier, French author and soldier

== Fictional characters ==
- Alain, recurring character in the Pokémon anime series
- Alain, a recurring character in tokusatsu series Kamen Rider Ghost
- Alain van Versch, a character played by Matthias Schoenaerts in Rust and Bone

== See also ==
- Alain (surname)
