= Stanzione =

Stanzione is a surname. Notable people with the surname include:

- Massimo Stanzione (1586–1656), Italian painter
- Lucien Stanzione (born 1950), American politician
- Vince Stanzione (born 1968/69), British businessman
- Dominick Stanzione, American hospital administrator
