= List of senators of Vaucluse =

Location of Vaucluse in France

Following is a list of senators of Vaucluse, people who have represented the department of Vaucluse in the Senate of France.

== Third Republic ==
Senators for Vaucluse under the French Third Republic were:

- Frédéric Granier (1876–1882)
- Elzéar Pin (1876–1883)
- Alphonse Gent (1882–1894)
- Alfred Joseph Naquet (1883–1890)
- Eugène Guérin (1890–1920)
- Georges Taulier (1894–1899)
- Auguste Béraud (1900–1905)
- Achille Maureau (1905–1920)
- Louis Serre (1920–1936)
- Louis Tissier (1920–1936)
- Ulysse Fabre (1936–1940)
- Louis Gros (1936–1940)

== Fourth Republic ==
Senators for Vaucluse under the French Fourth Republic were:

- Lucien Grangeon (1946–1948)
- Jean Geoffroy (1948–1959)
- Marcel Pellenc (1948–1959)

== Fifth Republic ==
Senators for Vaucluse under the French Fifth Republic:

Period	Name	Party or group	Notes
1959–1972	Marcel Pellenc	Gauche Démocratique	Died 19 October 1972
1959–1986	Jean Geoffroy	Socialiste	
1972–1977	Édouard Grangier	Gauche Démocratique	Replaced Marcel Pellenc on 20 October 1972
1977–1986	Henri Duffaut	Socialiste	
1986–1995	Jacques Bérard	Rassemblement pour la République	
1986–1987	Maurice Charretier	Républicains et des Indépendants	Died 30 September 1987
1987–2014	Alain Dufaut	Rally for the Republic (RPR); Union for a Popular Movement (UMP)	Replaced Maurice Charretier on 1 October 1987
1995–2020	Claude Haut	La République En Marche	
2014–2015	Geneviève Jean	Groupe socialiste	Election annulled 12 February 2015
From 2004	Alain Milon	Union for a Popular Movement (UMP)	
From 2015	Alain Dufaut	Union for a Popular Movement (UMP)	Replaced Geneviève Jean on 13 February 2015
From 2020	Lucien Stanzione	Socialiste	

== Sources ==
- Liste des anciens sénateurs de la IIIème République par circonscription (in French), Sénat de France
- Liste des anciens sénateurs de la IVème République par circonscription (in French), Sénat de France
- Liste des anciens sénateurs de la Vème République par circonscription (in French), Sénat de France
- Liste par département - Vaucluse (in French), Sénat de France
