= Koudou =

Koudou is a surname. Notable people with the surname include:

- Aimé Koudou (born 1976), Ivorian footballer
- Alain Koudou (born 1984), Ivorian footballer
- Ismaël Koudou (born 1975), Burkinabé footballer
- Thérence Koudou (born 2004), French footballer
