= Michel Deguy =

French poet and translator (1930–2022)

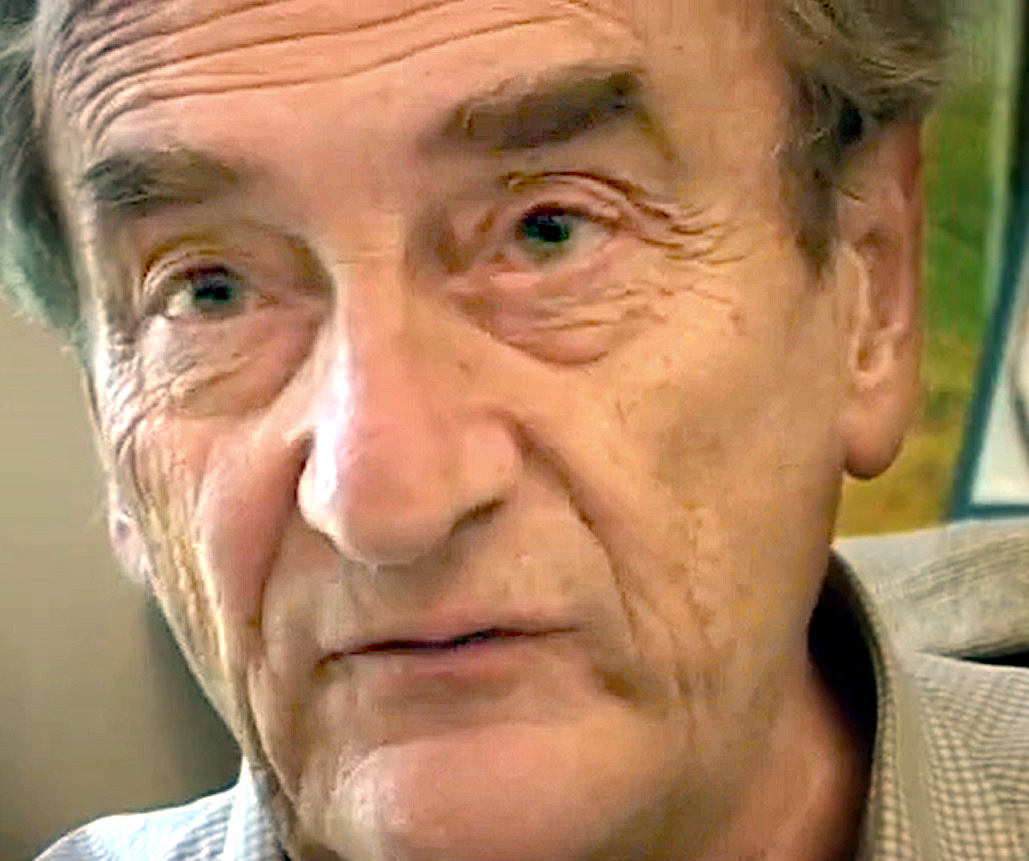
- Deguy in Speaking Portraits c.2003
- Born: 23 May 1930; Paris, France
- Died: 16 February 2022 (aged 91); Paris, France
- Occupations: Poet and translator

Michel Deguy (23 May 1930 – 16 February 2022) was a French poet and translator.

== Biography ==
Deguy was born in Paris on 23 May 1930 into a family of industrialists. He taught French literature at the Universite de Paris VIII (Saint-Denis) for many years. He also served as director of the French literary journal Po&sie, and as editor of Les Temps Modernes, the literary journal founded by Jean-Paul Sartre. As a translator, he translated Heidegger, Gongora, Sappho, Dante, and many others.

He won the following prizes for his work: the Prix Mallarme, the Grand prix national de la poésie, the Prix Max Jacob, the Grand Prix de Poésie de l'Académie Française, the Prix Fénéon, and the Prix Joseph-Kessel.

Deguy died in Paris on 16 February 2022, at the age of 91. The actress Marie-Armelle Deguy is his daughter.

== Works ==
- Les Meurtrières, Pierre Jean Oswald, 1959, 63 p.
- Fragment du cadastre, Gallimard, series "Le Chemin", 1960, 156 p.
- Poèmes de la presqu’île, Hermann, series "Le Chemin", 1961, 149 p.
- Le Monde de Thomas Mann, Plon, 1962, 168 p.
- Biefs : poèmes, Gallimard, "Collection Blanche", 1964, 164 p.
- Actes, Gallimard, series "Le Chemin", 1966. 301 p.
- Ouï dire, Gallimard, series "Blanche", 1966, 109 p. (reprinted with a preface by Alain Bonfand, La Différence, series "Orphée", (136), 1992, 127 p.)
- Histoire des rechutes, Éditions Promesse, series "Diptyque", 1968, 33 p. (etchings by Enrique Zañartu)
- Figurations : poèmes, propositions, études, Gallimard, series "Le Chemin", 1969, 272 p.
- Poèmes 1960-1970, preface by Henri Meschonnic, Gallimard, series "Poésie", (90), 1973, 143 p.; reprinted in 1998
- Tombeau de Du Bellay, Gallimard, series "Le Chemin", 1973, 234 p.; réédité en 1989
- Coupes, Luxembourg, Origine, series "Le Verger", (18), 1974, 33 p. (poems by M. Deguy accompanied by their Italian translations by Luigi Mormino and one linogravure by Jorge Perez-Roman.)
- Interdictions du séjour, L’Énergumène, 1975, 38 p. (with quasi-quotes by Thomas Hardy, Schlesinger, Benveniste, Homère, Mallarmé, Aristote, G. Iommi, Suétone, Kierkegaard, Kafka, Villon et Pernette du Guillet.)
- Reliefs, Éditions D’atelier, 1975, 143 p.
- Abréviations usuelles, Malakoff, Orange Export Ltd, series "Chutes", 1977 [s.n.]
- Jumelages, followed by Made in USA : poèmes, Le Seuil, series "Fiction & Cie", 1978, 232 p.
- Vingt Poètes américains, Gallimard, series "Du monde entier", 1980, 495 p. [bilingual edition]
- Donnant, Donnant : cartes, airs, brevets, Gallimard, series "Le Chemin", 1981, 140 p.
- La Machine matrimoniale ou Marivaux, Gallimard, series "Le Chemin", 1982, 292 p., with a bibliography (reprinted in 1986 in the series "Tel", (110), 319 p.
- René Girard et le problème du Mal, Grasset, 1982, 333 p.
- Gisants. Poèmes, Gallimard, 1985, 139 p.
- Brevets, Seyssel, Champ Vallon, series "Recueil", 1986, 260 p.
- Choses de la poésie et affaire culturelle, Hachette, 1986, 220 p.
- Poèmes II. 1970-1980, Gallimard, series "Poésie", (205), 1986, 183 p., postface de l’auteur
- La poésie n’est pas seule : court traité de poétique, Le Seuil, series "Fiction & Cie", (99), 1987, 185 p.
- Le Comité. Confessions d’un lecteur de grande maison, Seyssel, Champ Vallon, 1988, 206 p.
- Du Sublime, Éditions Belin, 1988, 259 p.
- Arrêts fréquents, A. M. Métailié, series "L’Élémentaire", 1990, 119 p.
- Au sujet de Shoah, le film de Claude Lanzmann, Belin, series "L’Extrême contemporain", 1990, 316 p.
- L’Hexaméron : il y a prose et prose (with Michel Chaillou, Florence Delay, Natacha Michel, Denis Roche and Jacques Roubaud), Le Seuil, series "Fiction & Cie", 1990, 126 p.
- Aux heures d’affluence. Poèmes et proses, Le Seuil, series "Fiction & Cie", 1993, 200 p.
- À ce qui n’en finit pas. Thrène, Le Seuil, series "La Librairie du XXe", 1995 [s.n.]; translated as To That Which Ends Not by Robert Harvey, New York, Spuyten Duyvil, 2018.
- À l’infinitif, Paris, Éditions La Centuplée, 1996, 56 p.
- L’Énergie du désespoir, ou d’une poétique continuée par tous les moyens, Presses universitaires de France, series "Les essais du Collège international de Philosophie", 1998, 119 p.
- Gisants. Poèmes III. 1980-1995, Gallimard, series "Poésie", 1999, 239 p.
- La Raison poétique, Paris, Éditions Galilée, series "La Philosophie en effet", 2000, 221 p.
- L’Impair, Tours, Farrago, 2000 [2001], 155 p.
- Spleen de Paris, Éditions Galilée, 2000, 54 p.
- Poèmes en pensée, Bordeaux, éd. Le Bleu du ciel, 2002, 59 p. (includes "Motifs pour un poème" by Alain Lestié.)
- Un homme de peu de foi, Paris, Bayard, 2002, 216 p.
- L’Amour et la vie d’une femme, Bordeaux, éd. Le Bleu du ciel, July 2004, non paginé, hors commerce
- Chirurgie esthétique, Michel Deguy/Bertrand Dorny, 12 ex. photocopiés, accompagnés de collages originaux by Bertrand Dorny, Paris, Galerie Thessa Herold, 2004, 12 p. (includes numerous texts by Deguy on the works presented in the catalog: La Fête Ici, La Cervelle, Pourquoi ne pas Bertrand... Pour Bertrand Dorny, Au gué du bois flotté... Topomorphoses, Vitrines, Musée manipulé, Architectures.)
- Au jugé, Éditions Galilée, 2004, 213 p.
- Sans retour. Être ou ne pas être juif, Éditions Galilée, 134 p.
- Recumbents: poems. With « How to name » by Jacques Derrida, translations, foreword, and notes by Wilson Baldridge, Middletown, Wesleyan University Press, 2005, 236 p.
- Le Sens de la visite, Stock, series "L'Autre Pensée", 2006, 353 p.
- Des poètes français contemporains, with Robert Davreu and Hédi Kaddour, Éditions ADPF, Paris, 2006, 130 p.
- Réouverture après travaux, frontispiece by Valerio Adami, Éditions Galilée, 2007, 271 p.
- Desolatio, Galilée, 2007, 97 p.
- Grand cahier Michel Deguy, collective coordonnated by J.-P. Moussaron, Coutras, éd. Le Bleu du ciel, 2007, 334 p. (in appendix Meurtrières by M. Deguy; bibliography p. 330-334.)
- La Fin dans le monde, Éditions Hermann, series "Le Bel Aujourd'hui", 2009
- L’État de la désunion, Paris, Galaade éditions, 2010, 48 p.
- Écologiques, Éditions Hermann, series "Le Bel Aujourd'hui", 2012, 260 p.
- La Pietà Baudelaire, Belin, series "L'extrême contemporain", 2013

== Bibliography ==
- Max Loreau, Michel Deguy. La poursuite de la poésie tout entière, Gallimard, coll. « Le Chemin », 1980.
- Jean-Pierre Moussaron, La Poésie comme avenir. Essai sur l'œuvre de Michel Deguy, précédé de « Syllabe », de Jacques Derrida, Le Griffon d'argile/Presses universitaires de Grenoble, coll. « Trait d'union », Sainte-Foy/Grenoble, 1992.
- Hélène Volat et Robert Harvey, Les écrits de Michel Deguy : Bibliographie, 1960-2000, IMEC, coll. « Inventaires », Paris, 2002.
- Martin Rueff, Différence et identité. Michel Deguy, situation d'un poète lyrique à l'apogée du capitalisme culturel, Hermann, Paris, 2009.

=== Symposium ===
- Michel Deguy. L'allégresse pensive, Martin Rueff (dir.), Paris, Belin, coll. « L'extrême contemporain », 2007, 575 p.; Centre culturel international de Cerisy-la-Salle, Manche, 2006
