= Élisabeth de Feydeau =

French historian and writer

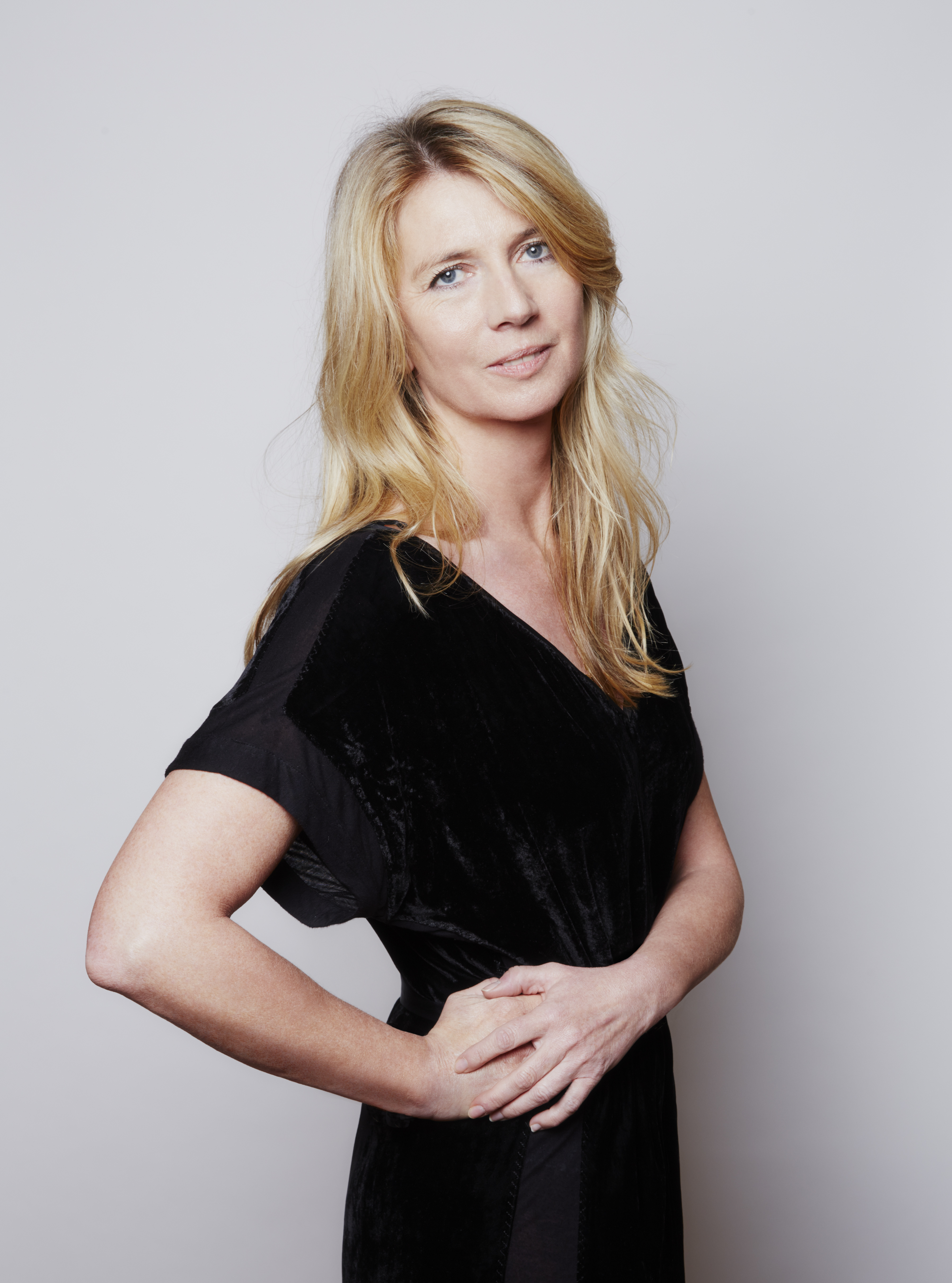
- Born: Mabille de Poncheville; 28 July 1966 (age 60); Mauriac, Cantal, France
- Other name: Élisabeth de Feydeau de Saint-Christophe
- Education: Sorbonne
- Occupations: Historian, writer
- Awards: Chevalier de l'ordre des Arts et des Lettres

Élisabeth de Feydeau (born 28 July 1966), is a French historian and writer. She is also an expert in fragrance.

== Biography ==
Élisabeth de Feydeau de Saint-Christophe, born Mabille de Poncheville, is the granddaughter of André Mabille de Poncheville, a French poet and writer, and the great-granddaughter of Georges Vidor, a shipowner.

After a doctorate in history, she became a member of the commission responsible for cultural affairs at the fashion firms Chanel and Bourjois. She established and managed the departments there, acquiring her first basic knowledge of the raw materials for fragrance.

She decided, in 1997, to set up her own firm, "Arty Fragrance", where she started working as a consultant for olfactory and cultural development. She moved on to work for Jean-Paul Gaultier, Chanel, Christian Dior Perfume, L'Oréal Paris and Guerlain.

She continued her research work fragrance and wrote books about it: Jean-Louis Fargeon, perfumer of Marie-Antoinette (2005), L'Herbier de Marie-Antoinette (2012), Les Parfums, histoire, dictionnaire, anthologie (2011), Les 101 mots du parfums (2013)...

She has taught at the School of Fragrances in Versailles since 1998.

She has put up several exhibitions, such as "Parfums de Promenade", in the "Galerie des Galeries" (Galeries Lafayette, 2001) and at "La Cour des Senteurs de Versailles" (2013). She has also animated workshops and conferences all around the world, particularly in Francophone countries.

In 2011, she introduced the brand "Arty Fragrance by Elisabeth de Feydeau", where she created and commercialized a more confidential line of perfumes, all inspired by the luxury and sophistication of the French 17th and 18th centuries, such as they could be felt, more than anywhere else, at the Château de Versailles: she has often wandered around in the Park of Versailles, while doing research work for her books. In 2006, she was chosen by the rose-breeder Meilland to be godmother to the new rose called "Petit Trianon", along with another perfume-maker, Francis Kurkdjian, with whom she had just recreated the fragrance of French queen Marie-Antoinette: Le Sillage de la Reine.

Since 2008, she has been holding a blog where she regularly publishes articles about perfumes, perfume-makers – and, in a more general way, about the world of perfumes.

== Distinctions ==
- 2005: Prix Guerlain for her book Jean-Louis Fargeon, parfumeur de Marie-Antoinette (2005)
- 2010: Chevalier des Arts et des Lettres by the culture minister, Frederic Mitterrand.
- 2010: Dame de la Jurade in Saint-Émilion.
- 2013: Achievement Award in the category of Créateur de la part du CEW (Cosmetic Executive Women)

== Publications ==
- France, Terre de Luxe (La Martinière Group, 2000 in collaboration with Jacques Marseille)
- L'un des sens, parfum du XXème siècle (Milan, 2001 in collaboration)
- Le Livre des grandes marques: à la découverte des marques grand public parmi les plus fortes de France, collectif (Milan's editions, 2003)
- Jean-Louis Fargeon, parfumeur de Marie-Antoinette (Perrin, 2005, translate in several languages)
- Diptyque (Perrin, 2007)
- Les Parfums : histoire, anthologie, dictionnaire (Robert Laffont, 2011)
- L’Herbier de Marie-Antoinette (Flammarion, 2012, under the direction of Alain Baraton, translate in several language)
- Les 101 mots du parfum (Archibooks, 2013)
- Bourjois : la beauté à l'accent français depuis 1863, Editions du Chêne, 2014
- Le roman des Guerlain. Parfumeurs de Paris, Flammarion, 2017
