= Viala =

Viala may refer to:

- "Viala", an alternate name of the Chasselas wine grape variety
- French ship Viala (1795), a ship-of-the-line of the French Navy

== Places ==
- Calmels-et-le-Viala, Aveyron department, France
- Viala-du-Pas-de-Jaux, Aveyron department, France
- Viala-du-Tarn, Aveyron department, France

== People with the surname ==
- Alain Viala (1947–2021), professor of French literature
- Joseph Agricol Viala (1780–1793), child hero in the French Revolutionary Army
- Pierre Viala (1859–1936), French scientist

== See also ==
- Vialas, Lozère department, France
