= Amougou =

Amougou may refer to:

== People ==
=== Firs surname ===
- Jean-Pierre Amougou Belinga (born 1965), Cameroonian businessmen

=== Surname ===
- Alain Amougou (born 1973), Cameroonian retired professional footballer
- Andre Amougou (born 1985), Cameroonian former footballer
- Christian Nsi Amougou (born 1989), Cameroonian former professional footballer
- Mathis Amougou (born 2006), French professional footballer
