= Claude Haut =

French politician

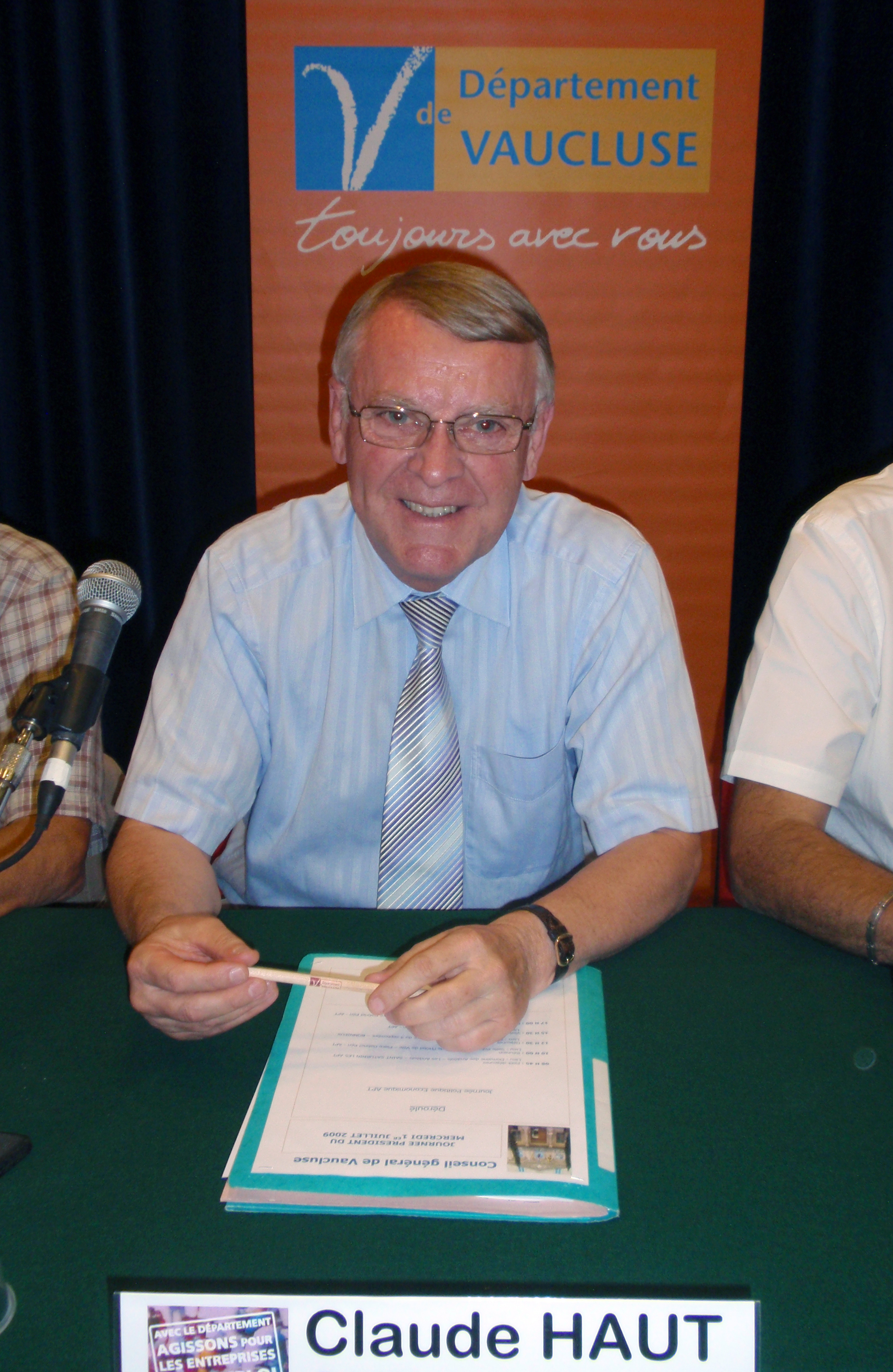

Personal details
- Born: 22 December 1944 (age 81) Beaumes-de-Venise, France
- Party: PS (until 2017); LREM (from 2017); TdP (since 2020)

Claude Haut (born 22 December 1944) was a member of the Senate of France, representing the Vaucluse department from 1995 to 2020. He was a member of the Socialist Party until moving to LREM in 2017.

== Previous mandates ==
- Mayor of Vaison-la-Romaine from 1992 to 2001.
- President of the General council of Vaucluse from 2001 to 2015.
- General councillor from the Canton of Vaison-la-Romaine from 1994 to 2015.
- Departmental councillor from the Canton of Vaison-la-Romaine in 2015 (resigned).
- Senator of Vaucluse from 1995 to 2020.
