= L'Œuvre de la Goutte de Lait =

Painting by Jean Geoffroy

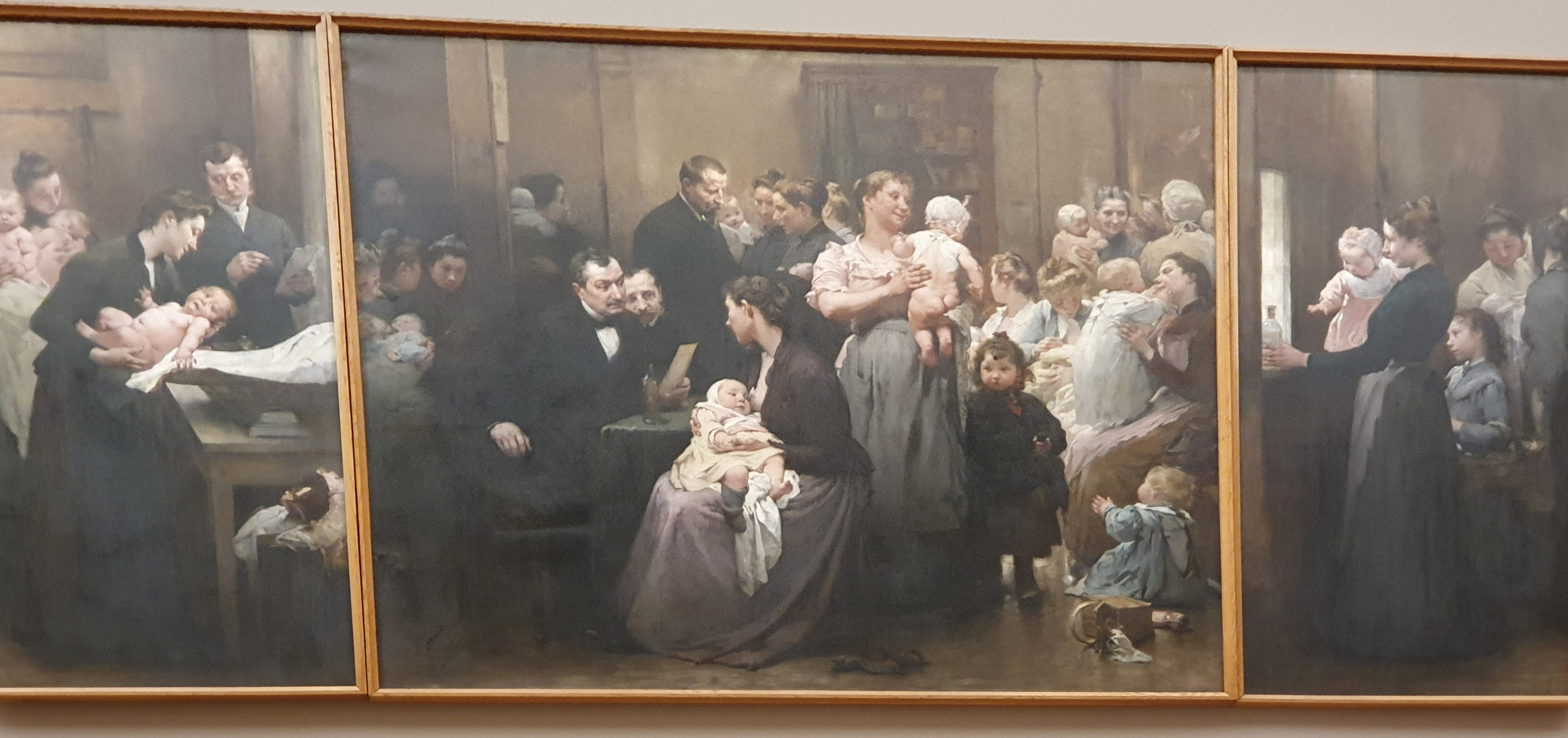
Jean Geoffroy, La goutte de lait, 1903, Petit Palais, Paris

L'Œuvre de la goutte de lait, or L'Œuvre de la goutte de lait au dispensaire de Belleville (The Work of the “drop of milk" at the Belleville dispensary) is a painted triptych by Jean Geoffroy. It was painted in 1901, purchased by the city of Paris from the Salon of 1903 and is currently in the collection of the Petit Palais. The image was popularised across France through circulation of a postcard version.

== Subject ==
At the end of the 19th century, modern ideas about children’s health began to reach poorer sections of society that had previously benefitted little from medicine. Dispensaries were set up, such as the "Gouttes de lait" (“Drops of milk”), intended to reduce infant mortality in the working class. There babies were regularly weighed, cared for when they fell ill, and issued with pasteurised milk.

The left panel shows a newborn baby being weighed shortly after birth; the central panel is full of healthy children and smiling mothers who surround a new mother as she listens carefully to the doctor’s advice about using sterilized milk; the main figure in this panel is fr:Gaston Variot, a pioneer of childcare and colleague of Louis Pasteur. In 1892, he had founded this Belleville dispensary to protect early childhood while ensuring the education of mothers. Doctor Variot, who liked to surround himself with artists, found in Geoffroy a friend who shared his ideals. The right panel shows the young mother receiving her supply of sterilized milk in a bottle.

The triptych form, more commonly used for religious paintings, suggests the saintly character of the work to save children through the modern pediatric medicine. The colour scheme is somber, reflecting the plain clothes of the subjects as well as the austere and hygienic conditions of the dispensary. The general darkness is however interrupted where light falls on the plump flesh of the children and the smiling expressions of the mothers.

== See also ==
- Realism (arts)
- Socialist realism
- Visiting day at the hospital
