= Max Loreau =

Belgian philosopher, poet and art critic (1928–1990)

Max Loreau (7 June 1928 – 7 January 1990) was a 20th-century Belgian philosopher, poet and art critic.

== Life and career ==
Born in Brussels, Max Loreau was a professor of modern philosophy at the University of Brussels.

He was interested in a number of movements ranging from the Renaissance to Cobra. His work focused on artists such as Jean Dubuffet, Guillaume Corneille, and Asger Jorn. A comprehensive study of the logograms by Christian Dotremont was published in 1975; Loreau also worked with Pierre Alechinsky, who helped him to publish L'Épreuve. He died in 1990.

Loreau's philosophy is rooted primarily in phenomenology.

== Publications ==
- 1966: Dubuffet et le voyage du centre de la perception. La Jeune Parque. (essay).
- 1967: Vers une peinture péremptoire. Asger Jorn. Galerie Jeanne Bucher..
- 1967: Cerceaux s’orcellent. Galerie Jeanne Bucher. (poems).
- 1971: Jean Dubuffet. Délits, déportements, lieux de haut jeu. Weber. (tirage limité).
- 1973: Cri. Éclat et phases. Gallimard. (essay).
- 1973: Jean Dubuffet. Stratégie de la création. Gallimard. (essay).
- 1975: Dotremont. Logogrammes. Georges Fall.
- 1976: Nouvelles des êtres et des pas. Gallimard. (short stories).
- 1977: Chants de perpétuelle venue. Gallimard. (poems).
- 1980: Michel Deguy. La poursuite de la poésie tout entière. Le Chemin. Gallimard. p. 192. ISBN 2070200965. (essay).
- 1980: La Peinture à l’œuvre et l’énigme du corps. Gallimard. (essay)
- 1986: Florence portée aux nues. L’Astrée. (poems).
- 1987: En quête d’un autre commencement. Leeber-Hossmann. (essay)
- 1989: La Genèse du phénomène. Le phénomène, le logos, l’origine. Éditions de Minuit. (essay)
- 1990: L’Épreuve. Fata Morgana. (poems).

Posthumous :

- 1997: "Ode à la pluie des fous". Po&sie. No. 80. pp. 215–226.
- 1998: De la création. Espace Nord. Labor.
- 2001: Genèse. Cri II. Galilée. (essay)
- 2005: Vue d’intérieur. Le drame de la naissance du Globe. Carte blanche.
- 2005: Les Ateliers de Max Loreau, écrire, tracer, penser; Articles 1962–1989. Labor.
- Poemes-Poesie, Prefazione e traduzione italiana con testo a fronte di Adriano Marchetti, Campanotto Editore, Pasian di Prato, 2012.ISBN 978-88-1292-3.
- L’Epreuve-La prova, prefazione e traduzione italiana con testo a fronte, a cura di Adriano Marchetti, Panozzo Editore, Rimini, 2010.ISBN 978-88-7472-139-9
- Opera da camera-Dans l’Éclat du Moment et Le Matin d’Orphé, Prefazione di Michel Deguy, Introduzione e traduzione italiana di Adriano Marchetti, Panozzo Editore, Rimini, 2005 ISBN 978-88-7472-056-9

== Bibliography ==
- Coll., Max Loreau (1928–1990), Brussels, Lebeer-Hossmann, 1991 (Contributions by Pierre Alechinsky, Francine Loreau, Michel Deguy, Éric Clemens, Bruno Van Camp, Robert Legros, Roland Hinnekens, Henri Raynal, Jacques Derrida, Jacques Bauduin).
- Revue La part de l'œil, 14, 1998," Dossier : Hommage à Max Loreau " (Contributions by Francine Loreau, Luc Richir, Kostas Axelos, Éric Clémens, Robert Davreu, Eddy Devolder, Daniel Giovannangeli, Roland Hinnekens, Adriano Marchetti, Lucien Massaert, Richard Mille Henri Raynal, Éliane Escoubas, Bruno Vancamp).
- Adriano Marchetti, La parole ´natale ´ de Max Loreau. Du rythme et de la variation, in Les avatars d’un regard. L’Italie vue à travers les écrivains belges de langue française, Clueb, Bologna 1988, Pages 185–206.
- Revue « Francofonia », 41, 2001, La Quête de l’imprévisible, par Adriano Marchetti.
- Adriano Marchetti, Max Loreau, parole d’avant la parole, Entretien et traduction réalisés par Pascal Leclerc, « Le Carnet et les Instants »,123, mai-septembre 2002.
- Hinnekens, Roland (2009). Max Loreau; Un autre éveil à la lumière. Ousia. p. 227. ISBN 978-2-87060-143-3.
- Adriano Marchetti, L’endiadi orfica di Max Loreau, in Odeporica e dintorni. Cento studi per Emanuele Lanceff, t. 4, CIRVI, Moncalieri 2011.
- Véronique Verdier, Existence et création, chapitre III, Paris, OL'Harmattan, series "Ouverture philosophique", 2016, p. 41-53.
