= Visiting day at the hospital =

1889 painting by Jean Geoffroy

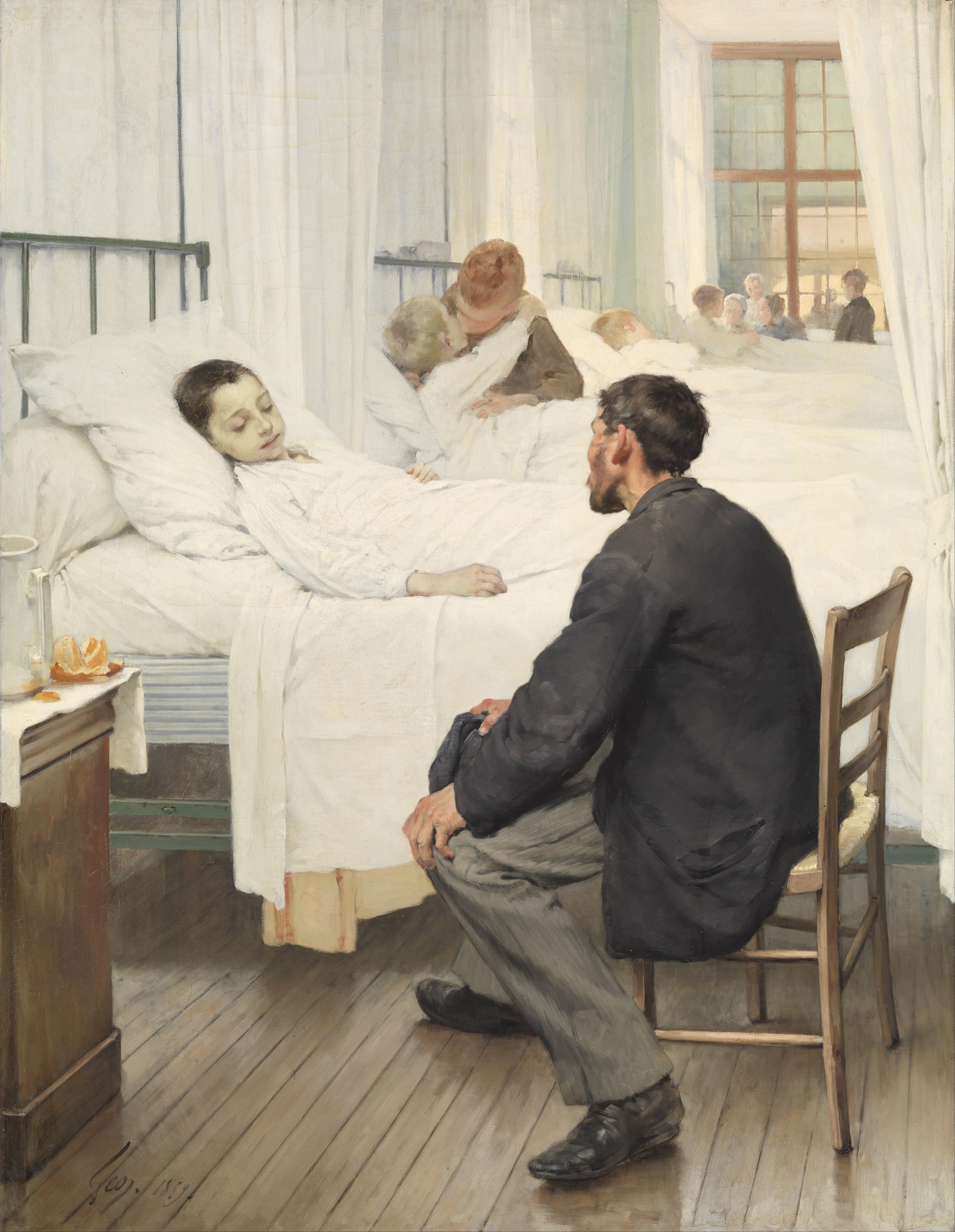
Jean Geoffroy - Visiting day at the Hospital

Visiting day at the hospital (French: Le jour de la visite à l'hôpital) is an 1889 oil on canvas painting by Jean Geoffroy.

== Provenance ==
The painting was bought from the salon of 1889 by the French Ministry of Education and was allocated to the Musée du Luxembourg. In 1926 it was reassigned to the Louvre but hung in the Hôtel de Ville, Vichy. It remained there until 2012 when it was transferred to the Musée d'Orsay.

== Composition ==
Geoffroy's paintings commonly dealt with themes such as schools, hospitals, poverty and faith, and often had children as their main figures. His paintings record some of the social advances of the Third Republic: schools, orphanages and a foundling hospital. A keen observer of this changing era, he addressed subjects from daily life never before depicted in academic painting, as was the case with this work about a father visiting his sick son in the hospital.

The painting depicts a hospital room, with a father in the foreground, hunched forward with his hands on his knees, sitting in a straw chair at the foot of an iron bedstead where his sick son lies. On the left, at the head of the bed is a small nightstand covered in a white cloth. On this are a water jug and a partially eaten orange. In the background, other child patients on the ward talk to visitors or sleep. The father is portrayed through his clothing and rough features as a worker, whose ruddy face contrasts sharply with the sickly pallor and swollen face of his boy. There is an emotional contrast between the restraint of the father in the foreground and the child behind them who is warmly embracing his mother. There is something about this visit that seems out of the ordinary. Le Pèlerin noted wryly that the (secular) state had purchased the painting because there were no crucifixes on the wall, no religious texts in view and no sign of any nuns ministering to the sick - indeed the interior depicted in the painting is extraordinarily spartan.

== Exhibition history ==
- 1889 - Salon de la Société des artistes français - Palais des Champs Elysées - Paris
- 1901 - Exposition de l'enfance - Paris
- 1968 - Le Salon imaginaire : Bilder aus den grossen Kunstausstellungen der zweiten Hälfte des XIX Jahrhunderts. - Kunstverein - Berlin
- 1973 - "Equivoques" : peintures françaises du XIXe siècle” - Musée des Arts décoratifs - Paris
- 1980 - Geoffroy - Musée de l'Assistance Publique – Hôpitaux de Paris - Paris
- 2010-11 - Ciencia y caridad al descubierto - Museu Picasso - Barcelona
- 2013-14 - Millet, Courbet et le naturalisme français: chefs-d'oeuvre du musée d'Orsay - China Art Museum - Shanghai
- 2014 - Musée d'Orsay. Capolavori - Complesso del Vittoriano - Rome
- 2015 - Jean Geoffroy (1853–1924), dit Géo. Une œuvre de généreuse humanité - Musée de l'Echevinage - Saintes
- 2015-16 - Jean Geoffroy (1853–1924). Un engagement républicain- Anne de Beaujeu Museum - Moulins

== Critical reception ==
Many aspects of the work were singled out for praise by critics. L'Artiste commented that Geoffroy's figures were very well-observed and nuanced, and remarked on how his work also had a slight air of mischief. It also noted the suppleness and clear tone of the painting of the curtains. L’Art Français described it as a remarkable work, of profoundly human character, entirely sincere and by virtue of this, cruel. It said the artist had taken a commonplace scene from the life of humble people and rendered it on canvas with the conviction of a historian. The Revue de Saintonge & d'Aunis praised the naturalism of the work and the quality of artistic execution. It commented that Geoffroy had presented to the public one of the most poignant dramas of hospital life, a father overwhelmed with pain at the sight of his ailing son.

== See also ==
- L'Œuvre de la Goutte de Lait
