= Alain Dufaut =

French politician

Alain Dufaut (born 2 January 1944 in Apt, Vaucluse) was a member of the Senate of France, representing the Vaucluse department, from 1 October 1987 to 30 September 2014. He is a member of the Union for a Popular Movement.

== Biography ==
A surveyor by profession, he became a member of the Vaucluse General Council, elected in the Canton of Avignon-Ouest on March 21, 1982. He has been re-elected ever since.

Alain Dufaut became senator for Vaucluse on October 1, 1987, replacing Maurice Charretier, who had died. He was elected under his own name on September 24, 1995, and re-elected on September 26, 2004. Running in 2014 at the head of a second UMP list, he was not re-elected under the proportional representation system. Defeated by a single vote, he lodged an appeal with the Constitutional Council, which finally declared him elected on February 12, 2015.

He ran in the March 2015 departmental elections in the Canton of Avignon-2, where he was eliminated in the first round by the National Front and Green Party candidates.

== Bibliography ==
- Page on the Senate website (in French)
