= Alain Ndjoubi Ossami =

Gabonese politician and economist

Alain Ndjoubi Ossami is a Gabonese politician and economist. He is the current national secretary of economy, finance, commerce and industry under the ruling Gabonese Democratic Party (Parti démocratique gabonais) (PDG).
