= Alain Fauconnier =

French politician

Senator, French Senate
- Constituency: Aveyron

Personal details
- Born: 20 February 1945 (age 81)
- Party: Socialist

Alain Fauconnier (born 20 February 1945) is a French politician and a former member of the Senate of France. He represented the Aveyron department as a member of the Socialist Party.

== Biography ==
In the September 2014 senatorial elections, Alain Fauconnier was defeated, along with former PRG deputy minister Anne-Marie Escoffier, by the two center-right candidates, Jean-Claude Luche of the Union of Democrats and Independents and Alain Marc of the Union for a Popular Movement.

In March and June 2020, Alain Fauconnier led a list in the municipal elections in Saint-Affrique, alongside Jean-Luc Malet, a former general councilor who had been convicted by the courts for having municipal staff work at his home. Alain Fauconnier's list was defeated in the second round of the municipal election by Sébastien David (45.92% of the vote against 41.04% for Alain Fauconnier and 13.04% for Loïc Raynal), after 19 years of socialist rule in the town hall of Saint-Affrique.

== Bibliography ==
- Page on the Senate website
