= Alain Tabourian =

Alain Tabourian (born 1964) is a Lebanese politician.

== Biography ==
He has served as the minister of energy and as the minister of telecommunications. He is the son of the late MP André Tabourian. He is an engineer, and has an M.B.A. from the Harvard Business School. He is the general manager of Interbrand Inc. a food processing company based in Lebanon.

The last session of the Sanioura cabinet held in Baabda ended with a dispute between PM Fouad Siniora and electricity Minister Alain Tabourian which was later terminated by President Michel Sleiman.
