= Alain Deneef =

Belgian businessman

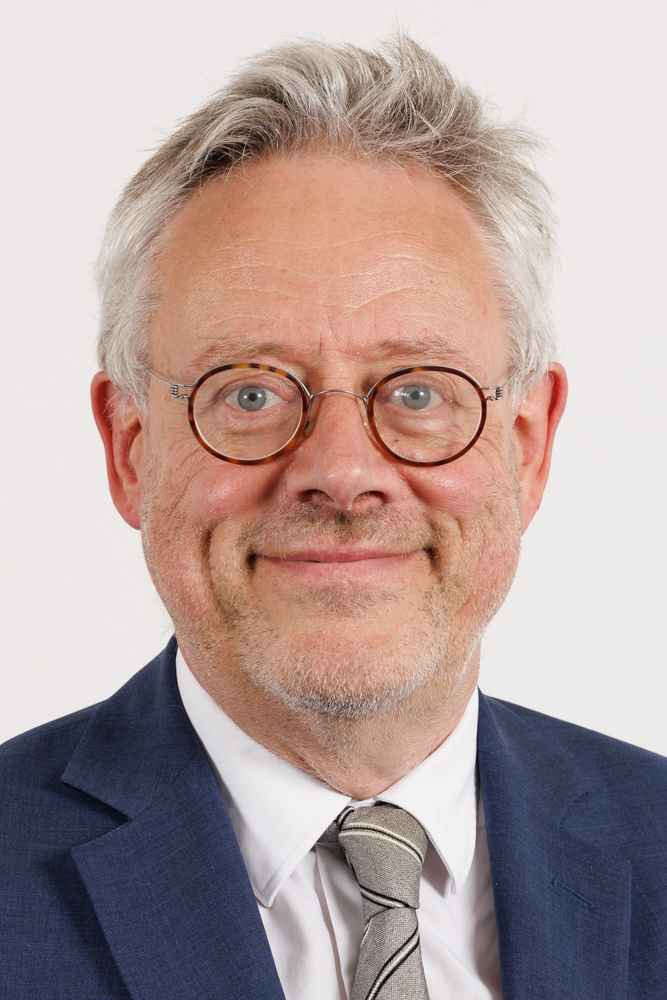
- Image of Deneef
- Occupation: Entrepreneur

Alain Deneef is a Belgian entrepreneur.

== Career ==
Deneef has held senior management positions at Canal+ Belgium, Belgacom and the SNCB, and has served as a director of BT Belgium, CIT Blaton and Carmeuse. He also works as a strategic consultant, advising medium and large organizations on how technological, financial, social, demographic, environmental, urban and political change will affect their future.

== Brussels Metropolitan and Aula Magna ==
Deneef was intendant of Brussels Metropolitan, the not-for-profit body created to carry out the "Business Route 2018 for Metropolitan Brussels",a socio-economic development strategy launched at the end of 2008 by the regional and federal employers' organizations BECI, VOKA, UWE and VBO/FEB. He is also the founder and president of Aula Magna, a think tank about Brussels that was created in 2006. Through Aula Magna he helped launch the Citizens' Forum of Brussels, which won the Flemish Prijs voor de Democratie (Democracy Prize) in July 2010, and organized the first Brussels Summer University in 2010, which has been held yearly since.

Deneef contributed two chapters to Demain Bruxsels, a collective volume by Aula Magna's authors (Eric Corijn, Alain Deneef, Myriam Gérard, Henri Goldman, Michel Hubert, Alain Maskens, Yvan Vandenbergh, Philippe Van Parijs and Fatima Zibouh): "Enseignement : préparer 2040" (on education, with the contribution of Alain Maskens) and "L'enjeu métropolitain" (on the metropolitan challenge, with Eric Corijn).

== Politics ==
Deneef stood as a candidate for Les Engagés in the Brussels regional elections, in fifth place on the party's list for the Brussels Region. In an interview on the regional broadcaster BX1, he called the city's GoodMove mobility plan a missed opportunity, praising its original aim of reducing car use in Brussels but criticizing its preparation, explanation and lack of interim evaluation after pilot phases, and said he favored public-private financing for the construction of Brussels metro line 3.
