= Alain Beaulé =

Canadian ice hockey player

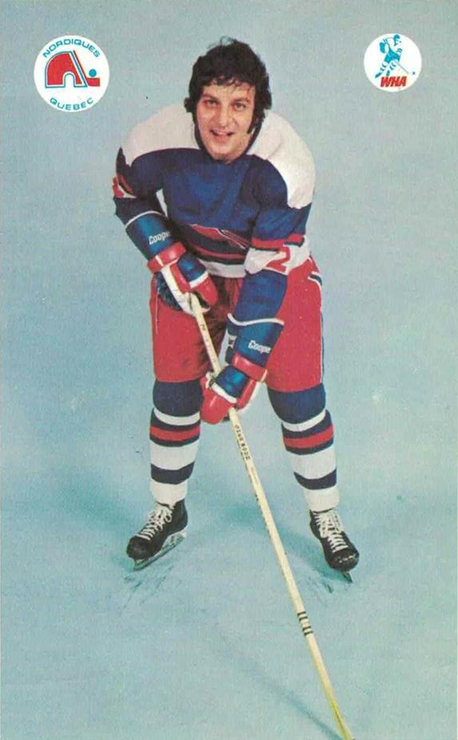
- Beaulé in 1973 photo
- Born: April 7, 1946 (age 80) Saint-Romain, Quebec, Canada
- Height: 6 ft 0 in (183 cm)
- Weight: 200 lb (91 kg; 14 st 4 lb)
- Position: Defence
- Shot: Left
- Played for: Quebec Nordiques; Winnipeg Jets
- Playing career: 1966–1975

Alain Beaulé (born April 7, 1946) is a Canadian retired professional ice hockey defenceman who played 183 games in the World Hockey Association for the Winnipeg Jets and Quebec Nordiques.

== Career statistics ==
=== Regular season and playoffs ===
			Regular season					Playoffs
Season	Team	League	GP	G	A	Pts	PIM	GP	G	A	Pts	PIM
1963–64	Victoriaville Bruins	QPJHL	34	5	17	22	39	—	—	—	—	—
1964–65	Victoriaville Bruins	QJAHL	40	22	31	53	0	—	—	—	—	—
1965–66	Shawinigan Bruins	QJAHL	––	21	44	65	0	—	—	—	—	—
1966–67	Dayton Gems	IHL	61	7	36	43	52	4	0	3	3	4
1967–68	Dayton Gems	IHL	63	10	49	59	42	11	3	3	6	8
1968–69	Dayton Gems	IHL	71	15	46	61	24	9	0	7	7	6
1969–70	Dayton Gems	IHL	67	13	41	54	46	13	3	12	15	6
1970–71	Phoenix Roadrunners	WHL	64	10	24	34	17	10	0	2	2	6
1971–72	Springfield Kings	AHL	30	2	6	8	34	3	0	3	3	4
1971–72	Oklahoma City Blazers	CHL	9	0	0	0	10	—	—	—	—	—
1972–73	Omaha Knights	CHL	14	2	11	13	32	11	2	5	7	20
1972–73	Springfield Kings	AHL	57	7	23	30	72	—	—	—	—	—
1973–74	Quebec Nordiques	WHA	78	4	36	40	93	—	—	—	—	—
1974–75	Quebec Nordiques	WHA	22	4	7	11	19	—	—	—	—	—
1974–75	Winnipeg Jets	WHA	54	0	14	14	24	—	—	—	—	—
WHA totals			23	5	7	12	4	—	—	—	—	—
