= Dominick Stanzione =

Dominick Stanzione, is a healthcare administrator in New York.

In 2009 He served as interim President and CEO and restructuring officer at Long Island College Hospital, following his departure from the Bon Secours Charity Health System, where he held the title of CEO. He was subsequently COO at Maimonides Medical Center in Brooklyn.

In 2021, Stanzione stepped down from his dual role as COO of One Brooklyn Health and CEO of Brookdale Hospital, roles he'd held since 2017.
