= Alain Lefebvre =

French author and journalist (born 1960)

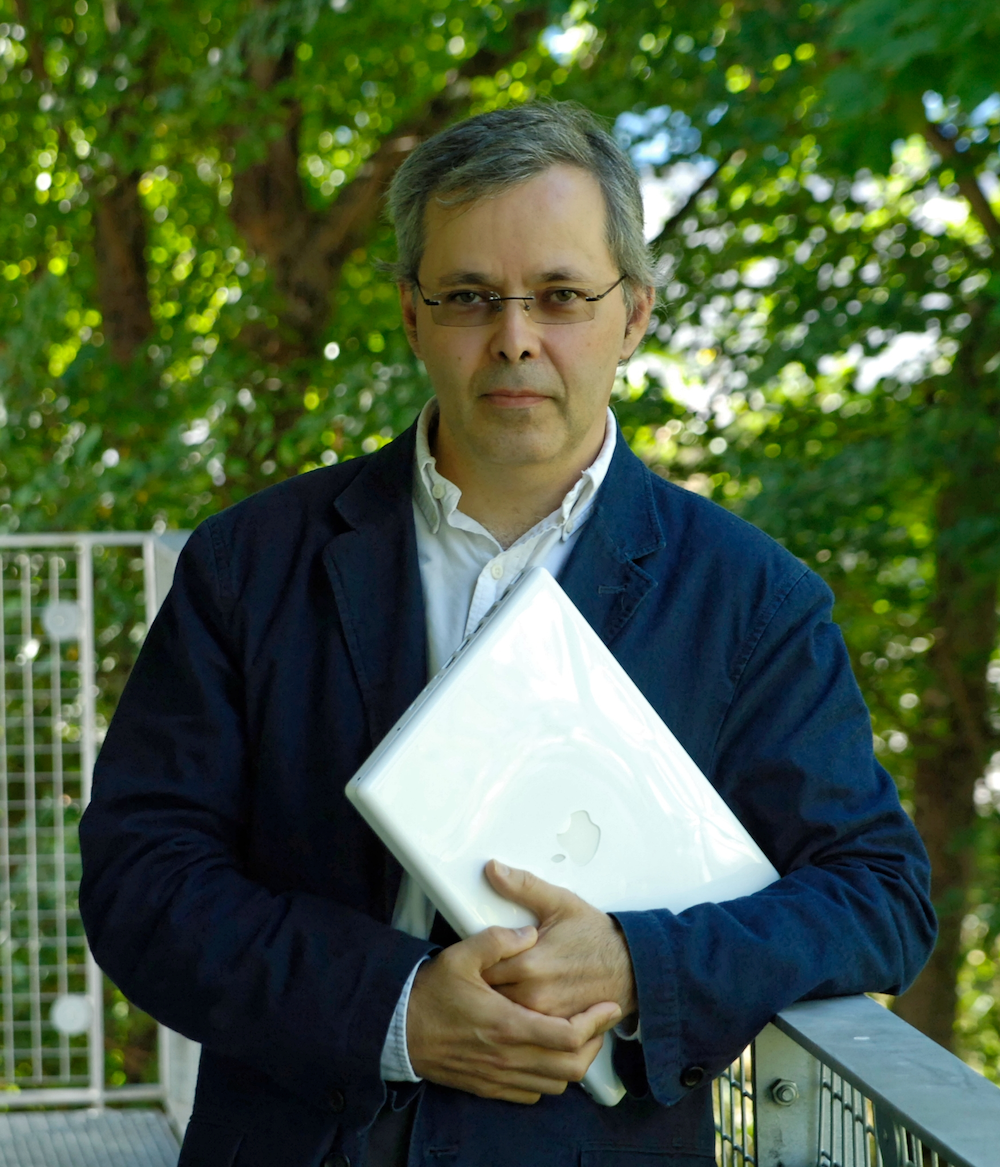
- Alain Lefebvre
- Born: 1960 (age 65–66); Paris, France
- Education: École nationale de l’éducation civile
- Occupations: Writer, entrepreneur
- Known for: Business books
- Website: www.alain-lefebvre.com

Alain Lefebvre (born 1960) is a French entrepreneur and author. He has made significant contributions to client server computing. He co-founded SQLI in 1990 and led the company for over ten years. Alain Lefebvre has published more than 29 books, five of which are about computer and internet topics. Since 1995, Lefebvre and his wife Murielle Lefebvre have been promoting Montessori education in France. He is the founder of the first professional social network in France, 6nergies.net. He has held network events, conferences, and was interviewed in 2004 about Web 2.0. He also published a book about social networks in 2005.

== Career ==
Alain began his career in IT in 1977. In 1980, he was hired by Thomson-CSF to work as a programmer on civil aircraft simulators. He became a Db2 consultant in 1988.

In 1990, he participated in the creation of SQL Engineering, which later became SQLI. In 1993, he wrote columns in the weekly Le Monde Informatique IT and 01 Informatique and published his first book: The Client-Server Architecture.

== SQLI ==
In 1990, Jean Rouveyrolles and Alain Lefebvre founded the company SQLI. The company was introduced to Euronext Paris in July 2000, during which SQLI had 700 employees.

In 1997, Alain Lefebvre began writing essays and a column named "The Terrible Truth" on his personal website. In April 2001, he left the SQLI group and became a motorsport driver, writing a book called "Racing" in 2004.

== Website ==
In the summer of 2004, Alain Lefebvre launched the first French social network for professionals: 6nergies.net. Alain Lefebvre published a book on this in 2005 titled Social Networks, M21 Editions. Although the website had more than 20,000 users by 2007, 6nergies.net did not manage to raise sufficient funds to survive. 6nergies.com closed in August 2009.

== Books ==
- Architecture client-serveur, Armand Colin, 1993, ISBN 978-2-200-21375-6 (récompensé par le "Prix du meilleur livre informatique")
- Intranet client-serveur universel, Eyrolles, 1996, ISBN 978-2-212-08927-1
- Web client-serveur, Eyrolles, 1998, ISBN 978-2-212-09039-0
- Le Troisième Tournant, Dunod, 2001, ISBN 978-2-10-005822-8.
- Perdu dans le temps, Manuscrit puis M21 éditions, 2004, ISBN 978-2-7481-3200-7.
- Les Réseaux sociaux, M21 éditions, 2005, ISBN 2-9520514-8-8.
- Racing, BOD, 2008, ISBN 978-2-8106-0061-8.
- SimRacing, Pearson, 2009, ISBN 978-2-7440-9265-7.
- Soheil Ayari, un pilote moderne, écrit avec Sassan Ayari, 2009, ISBN 978-2-9527852-2-8.
- Cow-boys contre chemins de fer ou que savez-vous vraiment de l'histoire de l'informatique, écrit avec Laurent Poulain, 2010, ISBN 978-2-9527852-4-2.
- Publier sur iPad & Kindle – Réalisez votre ebook: démarche et outils, étape par étape, 2011, ISBN 978-2-9527852-1-1.
- Cette révolte qui ne viendra pas, 2011, ISBN 979-10-90327-00-9.
- Prévision Maîtrise Contrôle, Tome 1, 2011, ISBN 979-10-90327-13-9.
- Simracing, seconde édition, 2012, ISBN 979-10-90327-16-0.
- Hacking, 2012, ISBN 979-10-90327-19-1.
- La malédiction des champions du monde de F1, 2012, ISBN 979-10-90327-27-6.
- Looking for TransContinum: Vincent Tria is lost in time, 2012, ISBN 978-1481019828.
- Un auteur à succès, 2013, ISBN 979-10-90327-20-7.
- Le miroir brisé des réseaux sociaux, 2013, ISBN 978-14-84814-18-5.
- Freedom Machine : la moto rend jeune !, 2014, ISBN 978-15-02735-06-5
- Prévision Maîtrise Contrôle, tome 2, ISBN 978-1512190-79-3
- Prévision Maîtrise Contrôle, tome 3, 2016, ISBN 978-1512190-79-3
- La guerre des Froes, 2015, ISBN 978-1517428365
- Dr Miracle, saison 1970, 2016, ISBN 978-1539969044
- Dr Miracle, saison 1971, 2017, ISBN 978-1973201618
- L'empereur, 2017, ISBN 978-1973201618
- Affaire classée: La première affaire du FBI à l'européenne, 2017, ISBN 978-1549925542
- Arrêtez de développer des applications, 2018, ISBN 978-1720209133
- Technologies : perception, illusion, déception, 2018, ISBN 978-1728680408
- Le facteur chance: qu'arriverait-il si un inconnu se mettait à tout gagner ?, 2020, ISBN 979-8605732716
- FUSAC : quand la finance se mêle d'informatique, 2020, ISBN 979-8668836574
- Vers l'informatique raisonnée: Le concept que vous attendiez !, 2020, ISBN 979-8674292883
- Du client-serveur au Web: 10 ans d'évolutions critiques des techniques informatiques, 2020, ISBN 979-8695198997
- Le fait technique: L’évolution technique est mal connue et mal comprise, 2021, ISBN 979-8453307302
- La terrible vérité – Petites chroniques sur la grande dualité, 2022, ISBN 978-1530711185
- La crise de l’IT des années 2020 et comment s’en sortir !, 2022, ISBN 979-8366473675
- Dr Miracle, saison 1972, 2023, ISBN 979-8866520558
