= Alain Joly =

French businessman

- Born: April 18, 1938 (age 88); Nantes, France
- Education: École polytechnique
- Occupation: CEO of Air Liquide (1995-2006)
- Known for: CEO of Air Liquide (1995-2006)

Alain Joly is a French businessman. He was CEO of Air Liquide.
