= Alain Bernat Gallego =

Andorran politician

Alain Bernat Gallego (born 1 November 1971) is an Andorran politician. He is a member of the Liberal Party of Andorra. He served in the General Council from April 25, 2005 until February 27, 2009.
