= Alain Bertaud =

French urban planner and author (born 1939)

- Born: 1939 (age 86–87)
- Citizenship: French
- Occupations: Urban planner, author
- Employer(s): New York University; Mercatus Center, George Mason University
- Known for: Order Without Design, urban density analysis, Mumbai FSI critique
- Awards: Honorary Doctorate, CEPT University (2024)

Academic background
- Education: École des Beaux-Arts, Paris (Architecte DPLG, 1967)

Alain Bertaud (born 1939) is a French urban planner and author. He is a Senior Fellow at New York University's Marron Institute of Urban Management and a Distinguished Visiting Fellow at the Mercatus Center at George Mason University. During a twenty-year career at the World Bank (1980–1999), he participated in urban infrastructure and housing projects across approximately 40 cities on four continents.

His book Order Without Design: How Markets Shape Cities (MIT Press, 2018) argues that urban planners should understand cities primarily as labor markets shaped by infrastructure networks and market forces, rather than as objects of design.

== Education and early career ==
Bertaud studied architecture at the École nationale supérieure des Beaux-Arts in Paris from 1958 to 1967, receiving the Architecte DPLG (Diplômé par le Gouvernement) qualification. In the early 1960s, he traveled to Chandigarh, India, where he worked as a draftsman under Pierre Jeanneret on Le Corbusier's planned city.

Before joining the World Bank, Bertaud worked as a resident urban planner in Tlemcen (Algeria), Sana'a (Yemen), Port-au-Prince (Haiti), San Salvador (El Salvador), and Bangkok (Thailand).

== World Bank career ==
As Principal Urban Planner at the World Bank from 1980 to 1999, Bertaud participated in the design and appraisal of large urban infrastructure and housing projects. His work focused on China, Central and Eastern Europe, India, Mexico, Russia, and South Africa. During this period, he developed comparative analyses of urban spatial structures across dozens of cities, using population density gradients and satellite imagery to understand how markets and planning regimes produce different urban forms.

Much of this research was conducted in collaboration with his wife, Marie-Agnès Bertaud, a GIS specialist who analyzed urban spatial data from satellite imagery.

== Key ideas ==
=== Cities as labor markets ===
Bertaud's central thesis is that a city functions primarily as a labor market, an agora where residents find matches between their skills and employer needs. City productivity depends on the size of the labor market accessible within a reasonable commute. Transportation infrastructure determines the commute shed that defines the labor market's extent, making infrastructure investment the most consequential planning decision.

=== Market forces and urban form ===
Bertaud argues that urban planners have drawn inspiration from the wrong discipline: design rather than economics. Markets, he contends, are like gravity; they exist everywhere and powerfully shape urban development whether or not planners acknowledge them. Zoning does not shape cities so much as constrain the market's response to infrastructure. When zoning restricts density below market demand, the result is not lower density but lower quality, as development moves to informal settlements or overcrowded legal units.

He cites pre-reform Chinese cities and Soviet cities as the extreme case: cities without land markets, which produced massive spatial inefficiencies and housing shortages despite total planning control.

=== Mumbai FSI critique ===
Bertaud's most influential case study concerns Mumbai's Floor Space Index (FSI) regulations. Mumbai's FSI has decreased from 4.5 in 1964 to approximately 1.0–1.33 in most residential zones, even as the city's population grew from 4 million to over 20 million. Bertaud argues this artificial density restriction creates the world's most expensive slums, where residents pay high prices for small, poorly ventilated rooms because the zoning code prohibits building upward to meet demand.

== Order Without Design ==
Order Without Design: How Markets Shape Cities was published by MIT Press in 2018. The book synthesizes Bertaud's career-long argument that planners should focus on providing infrastructure and monitoring market indicators (land prices, density gradients) while intervening only to correct negative externalities, rather than attempting to design entire cities from scratch. The book draws on case studies from cities including Mumbai, Brasília, Seoul, Moscow, and New York City.

The book has been translated into Chinese, Portuguese, and Czech.

== Awards and honors ==
- Honorary Doctorate (Honoris Causa) in Urban Planning, CEPT University, Ahmedabad, India (2024), the first honorary doctorate awarded by CEPT University in its history

== Selected publications ==
- Bertaud, Alain (2018). Order Without Design: How Markets Shape Cities. MIT Press. ISBN 978-0-262-03876-8.
- Bertaud, Alain; Renaud, Bertrand (1997). "Socialist Cities Without Land Markets". Journal of Urban Economics. 41 (1): 137–151.
- Bertaud, Alain; Malpezzi, Stephen (2001). "Measuring the Costs and Benefits of Urban Land Use Regulation". Journal of Housing Economics. 10 (3): 393–418.
- Bertaud, Alain (2002). "The Spatial Organization of Cities: Deliberate Outcome or Unforeseen Consequence?" (PDF). World Bank.

== See also ==
- Urban planning
- Floor area ratio
- Urban economics
- Zoning
- Smart growth
