= Alain Anderton =

British writer

Alain G. Anderton is an author of business studies and economics textbooks for use in secondary education in the U.K. He has written GCSE and A-level Economics textbooks (Economics for GCSE and Economics respectively), as well as a book on business studies.
