= Alain Mesili =

French mountain climber, guide, and activist (born 1949)

Alain Mesili (born 24 February 1949 in Paris) is a climber and mountain guide, photographer and political activist based in La Paz, Bolivia.

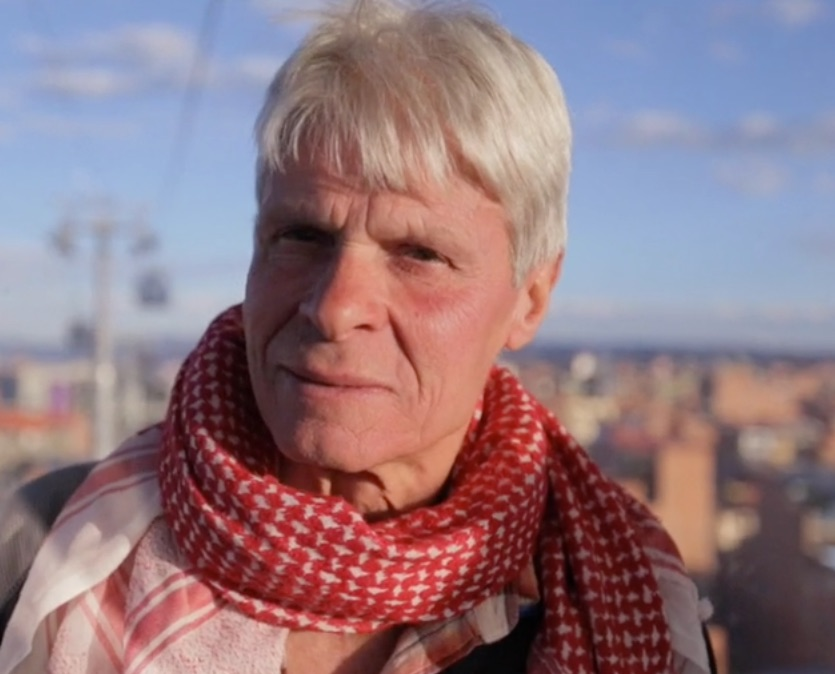
Image of Alain Mesili

He was a political activist in France during the 1968 student riots. In 1969 he left the country, disgusted by the French Communist Party's failures, for Argentina. Over the period of a year Mesili explored Patagonia, crossing the Southern Patagonian Ice Field; he may have been the first person to travel through modern-day Los Glaciares National Park. He further explored the Cordillera Darwin and crossed into Chile. He later moved to La Paz, where he worked as a mountain guide.

In 1991 Mesili was accused of being driver for the extreme left Commission Nestor Paz Zamora (CPNZ) during an attack on the US Marine barracks in La Paz in October 1990. He fled, eventually to his native France. In May 1994, he was arrested at Miami airport and held without trial for 9 months. He was then extradited to Bolivia in February 1995, in exchange for a Bolivian colonel accused of drug trafficking by the US authorities. He was released in 1997 without facing trial. By 1999, he had resumed his career as a mountain guide.
