= Canton of Avignon-Ouest =

Coordinates: 43.9500°N 4.8167°E

Avignon-Ouest
- Former canton
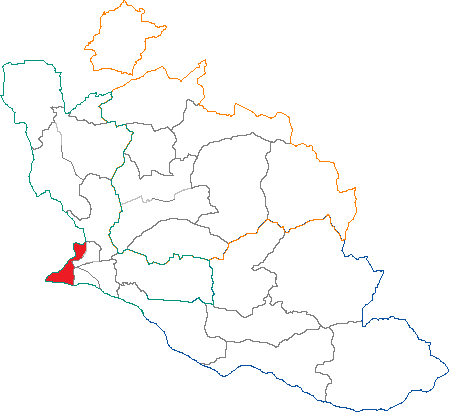
- Country: France
- Region: Provence-Alpes-Côte d'Azur
- Department: Vaucluse
- No. of communes: {{{nbcomm}}}
- Disbanded: 2015
- Population (2012): 23,867

The canton of Avignon-Ouest is a French former administrative division in the department of Vaucluse and region Provence-Alpes-Côte d'Azur. It had 23,867 inhabitants (2012). It was disbanded following the French canton reorganisation which came into effect in March 2015. It comprised part of the communes of Avignon.
