= Alain Benoit =

French physicist

Alain Benoit (born 1948) is a French physicist specialising in low temperature physics. He was awarded the CNRS silver medal in 1993 and the CNRS innovation medal in 2012.

He is a research director at the Grenoble Very Low Temperature Centre, where he contributed to the cooling of the European Space Agency's Planck telescope to 0.1 K. He was elected a member of the French Academy of Sciences in 2002.
