= Alain Zoubga =

Burkinabé politician and doctor

Alain Dominique Zoubga (born 1953 in Poa) is a Burkinabe politician and medical doctor who has served in the government of Burkina Faso as Minister of Social Action since 2013. Previously, he was appointed as Minister of Health by President Blaise Compaoré following the 1987 coup d'état and served until 1989. Dr. Zougba currently leads the Party for Democracy and Progress / Socialist Party (PDP-PS).
