= Vince Stanzione =

British entrepreneur (born 1968)

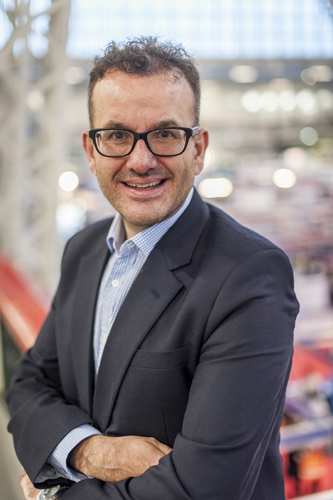
- Occupations: Financial Trader, Author, Entrepreneur
- Website: www.vincestanzione.com

Vince Stanzione (born 1968/1969) is a British entrepreneur.

Stanzione first worked as a hairdresser in his family's business in Luton before becoming a currency trader in the 1980s. After losing his savings in the 1987 stock market crash, Stanzione started mail order sales of mobile phones. In 1999 The Observer reported that he was worth over £1 million.

He returned to trading in financial markets and had a financially successful strong run in commodities, making over £2 million from spread betting with firms such as IG Index. In 2003 he was running courses teaching people how to spread bet.

In 2004 he launched The Advert Channel which was the world's first television channel dedicated to television commercials. In 2005 the parent company floated on the UK Alternative Investment Market AIM as TV Commerce Holdings Plc (TVC). In 2006 regulators ruled that one of the channels owned by TVC had deliberately kept callers on premium-rate telephone numbers waiting longer than necessary. The company was fined by ICSTIS, the channel was forced to close, TVC's share price fell by over 50% as a result and TVC warned that it may no longer be viable. TV Commerce Holdings plc became a shell company known as Gemstones of Africa in 2009.

In 2013 he published a book, The Millionaire Dropout which was listed in the New York Times list of bestselling books and USA Today bestselling books.
