= Lucien Stanzione =

French politician (born 1950)

Senator
- Incumbent
- Assumed office 1 October 2020

Mayor of Althen-des-Paluds
- In office March 2001 – March 2014

Personal details
- Born: 19 August 1950 (age 76)
- Party: Socialist Party

Lucien Stanzione (born 19 August 1950) is a French politician from the Socialist Party.

== Biography ==
A municipal councillor for the town of Althen-des-Paluds, after having been mayor for a few years, he was elected senator for Vaucluse on 27 September 2020.

Upon its founding in 2025, he became secretary of the Association of Friends of the Félibrige in the Senate.

== See also ==
- List of senators of Vaucluse
