= Alain Huetz de Lemps =

French geographer and botanist (1926–2024)

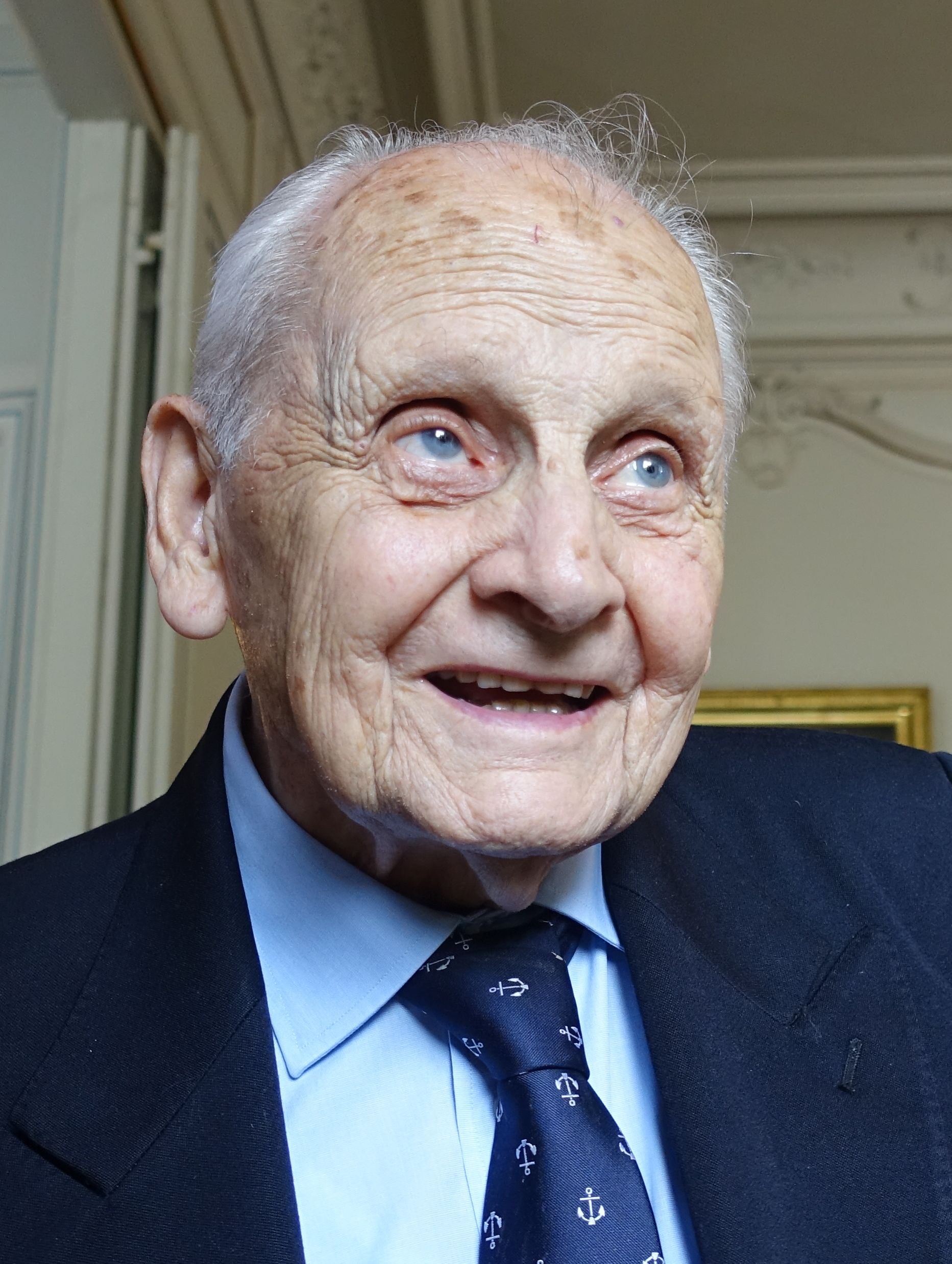
- de Lemps in 2019
- Born: 29 June 1926; Bourges, France
- Died: 13 October 2024 (aged 98); Bordeaux, France

Alain Huetz de Lemps (29 June 1926 – 13 October 2024) was a French geographer and botanist.

== Biography ==
He was a lecturer at Bordeaux University in France and Honoris Causa professor of the University of Valladolid in Spain. He wrote a primary reference work on wine in Castile and León, Vinos y Viñedos de Castilla y León.

De Lemps was the author of approximately 20 books and over 100 papers on the subjects of Spain (wine, spirits, fortified wine, botany), wines and spirits in general, sugar cane, and Oceania.

De Lemps died in Bordeaux on 13 October 2024, at the age of 98.
