= Alain A. Lewis =

American mathematician (born 1947)

Alain A. Lewis (born 1947) is an American mathematician. A student of the mathematical economist Kenneth Arrow, Lewis is credited by the historian of economics Philip Mirowski with making Arrow aware of computational limits to economic agency.

== Life ==
Lewis gained his BA in philosophy, economics and statistics from George Washington University in 1969, and a PhD in applied mathematics from Harvard University in 1979. He was based at Lawrence Livermore National Laboratory from 1978 to 1979, RAND Corporation from 1979 to 1982, the National University of Singapore from 1981 to 1983, Cornell University from 1983 to 1987 and University of California, Irvine from 1987.

== Works ==
- 'A Nonstandard Theory of Games. Part I: On the Existence of the Quasi-Kernel and Related Solution Concepts for *Finite Cooperative Games', Harvard University Center on Decision and Conflict in Complex Situations Technical Report no. TR-6, June 1979
- 'A Nonstandard Theory of Games. Part II. On Non-Atomic Representations', Harvard University, Technical Report no. TR-7, June 1979
- 'A Nonstandard Theory of Games. Part III. Noncooperative *Finite Games', Harvard University, Technical Report no TR-8, June 1979
- 'A Nonstandard Theory of Games. Part IV. Equilibrium Points for Finite Games', Technical Report no. TR-9, June 1979
- 'Arrow's theorem and group decision making on public policy', RAND Papers, 1979
- 'Aspects of fair division', RAND Papers, 1980
- (with Perry Thorndyke and others) 'Improving Training and Performance of Navy Teams: A Design for a Research Program', RAND Reports, 1980
- 'A note on the Lagrangean expression of Nash equilibria', RAND Papers, 1980
- 'On the formal character of plausible reasoning', RAND Papers, 1980
- 'The Use of Utility in Multiattribute Utility Analysis', RAND Papers, 1980
- 'Notes on *finite cooperative games', RAND Papers, 1981
- 'Hyperfinite Von Neumann games', Mathematical Social Sciences, Vol. 9, No. 2 (1985), pp. 189–194
- 'Loeb-measurable solutions to *finite games', Vol. 9, No. 3 (1985), pp. 197–247
- 'On effectively computable realizations of choice functions', Mathematical Social Sciences, Vol. 10, No. 1 (1985), pp. 43–80
- 'The minimum degree of recursively representable choice functions', Mathematical Social Sciences, Vol. 10, No. 2 (1985), pp. 179–88
- 'Complex structures and composite models – An essay on methodology', Mathematical Social Sciences, Vol. 10, No. 3 (1985), pp. 211–246
- 'On the construction of subinvariant weakly additive set-functions', Mathematical Social Sciences, Vol. 13, No. 1 (1987), pp. 81–86
- 'Some aspects of constructive mathematics that are relevant to the foundations of neoclassical mathematical economics and the theory of games', Stanford University Center for Research on Organization Efficiency, Technical Report No. 526 (April 1988).
- (with Rangarajan Sundaram) 'An alternate approach to axiomatizations of the von Neumann/Morgenstern characteristic function, Mathematical Social Sciences, Vol. 15, No. 2 (1988), pp. 145–56
- 'Lower bounds on degrees of game-theoretic structures', Mathematical Social Sciences, Vol. 16, No. 1 (1988), pp. 1–39
- 'An infinite version of arrow's theorem in the effective setting', Mathematical Social Sciences, Vol. 16, No. 1 (1988), pp. 41–48
- 'On the independence of core-equivalence results from Zermelo–Fraenkel set theory', Mathematical Social Sciences, Vol. 19. No. 1 (1990), pp. 55–95
- 'A note on degrees of presentation of games as relational structures', Mathematical Social Sciences, Vol. 19. No. 2 (1990), pp. 195–201
- 'A game-theoretic equivalence to the Hahn–Banach theorem', Mathematical Social Sciences, Vol. 20, No. 3 (1990), pp. 199–214
- 'On the Effective Content of Asymptotic Verifications of Edgeworth's Conjecture', 1991
- (with Y. Inagaki) 'On the Effective Content of Theories', preprint, University of California, Irvine School of Social Sciences, 1991.
- 'On Turing degrees of Walrasian models and a general impossibility result in the theory of decision-making', Mathematical Social Sciences, Vol. 24, No. 2-3 (1992), pp. 141–171
- 'Some aspects of effectively constructive mathematics that are relevant to the foundations of neoclassical mathematical economics and theory of games', Mathematical Social Sciences, Vol. 24, No. 2-3 (1992), pp. 209–235
