= Alain Supiot =

French legal scholar (born 1949)

Alain Supiot FBA
- Born: 5 June 1949 (age 77); Nantes, France
- Education: University of Bordeaux 1
- Employers: University of Poitiers; University of Nantes; Collège de France

Alain Supiot (French: [sypjo]; born 5 June 1949) is a French legal scholar. His work is notable in two complementary fields: labor law and legal theory.

Supiot earned his licentiate in law in 1970 and in sociology in 1972, and received his Ph.D. in law from the University of Bordeaux 1 in 1979.

He has taught at the University of Poitiers, the University of Nantes, and the Collège de France.

He was elected as a corresponding fellow to the British Academy in 2015. He is a member of the Global Commission on the Future of Work formed by International Labour Organization.

== Main works ==
- Supiot, Alain (2017-11-30). Governance by Numbers, The Making of a Legal Model of Allegiance. Hart Studies in Comparative Public Law. Translated by Brown, Saskia. Bloomsbury Publishing. ISBN 9781509907748.
- Supiot, Alain (2012). The Spirit of Philadelphia. Social Justice vs. the Total Market. London New-York: Verso. p. 160. ISBN 9781844677542.
- Supiot, Alain (2011). "Europe's awakening". In M-A Moreau (ed.). Before and after the Economic Crisis, What Implications for the European Social Model. Cheltenham (UK)/ Northampton (USA): Edward Edgar Publishing. pp. 292–309. ISBN 978-1-84980-995-5. Archived from the original on 2013-09-21.
- Supiot, Alain (2009). "The territorial Inscription of Laws". Soziologische Jurisprudenz, Festschrifte für Gunther Teubner. Berlin: De Gruyter. pp. 375–393. ISBN 978-3-89949-635-2.
- Supiot, Alain; Deakin, Simon, eds. (2009). Capacitas. Contract Law and the Institutional Preconditions of a Market Economy. Oxford: Hart Publishing. p. 171. ISBN 978-1-84113-997-5.
- Supiot, Alain (2007). Homo Juridicus. On the Anthropological Function of the Law. London - New York: Verso. pp. XXV + 246. ISBN 978-1-84467-105-2.
- Supiot, Alain, ed. (2001). Beyond Employment. Changes in Work and the Future of Labour Law in Europe. Oxford University Press. p. 245. ISBN 978-0-19-924304-4.
