= Jean Geoffroy =

French painter and illustrator (1853–1924)

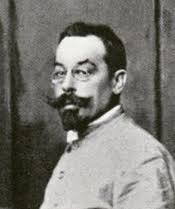
Jean Geoffroy (date unknown)

Henri-Jules-Jean Geoffroy, also known by the pseudonym Géo (1 March 1853 – 15 December 1924) was a French painter and illustrator, known primarily for his genre scenes with children. Some sources give his first names in reverse order.

== Biography ==
He was born in Marennes. His father, Jean-Baptiste (1822–1895), was a tailor and costume designer. His mother, Rosalie, was the eldest daughter of an English painter named John Dickinson (1791–1830). They moved to Paris when he was only two. In 1871, he began his studies at the École des Beaux-Arts; originally with Léon Bonnat, then with Eugène Levasseur (1822–1887) and Adolphe Yvon. His first exhibition came in 1874, at the Salon, followed by the Salon des Artistes Français, of which he became a member in 1883. For many years, until 1886, he took additional lessons from Émile Bin.

During these years, he had the patronage of the wood merchant, Laurent-Louis Borniche (1801–1883), who was also an avid art collector and creator of the Pavillon de l'Arsenal art museum. Geoffroy's career culminated with a gold medal at the Exposition Universelle (1900).

In 1882, he received a major commission from the Ministry of National Education. In addition to paintings, he provided guidance on how images could be used in the classroom. He was named an Officer of Public Instruction two years later. In 1887, he was named a Chevalier in the Legion of Honor. Another commission for five murals was received in 1893, occasioning trips to Brittany and Algeria to gather material.

He came to be a painter of children because, at the beginning of his career, he shared an apartment with two teachers, Louis and Julie Girard, above their private school. Years later, when they opened a boarding school, he took inspiration for his works there. Many document the social advancements made during the Third Republic. When Louis died in 1890, he became Julie's protector.

Around 1876, he met Pierre-Jules Hetzel, who hired him to be an illustrator of books for young people. After 1880, he signed his illustrations with the name "Géo". He also became friends with Doctor Gaston Variot, who had worked with Louis Pasteur, and became an enthusiastic campaigner for Pasteurization.

He died in Paris of an undisclosed illness in 1924 and willed his remaining collection to Julie Girard. The Girard family still maintains his studio.

== Selected paintings ==
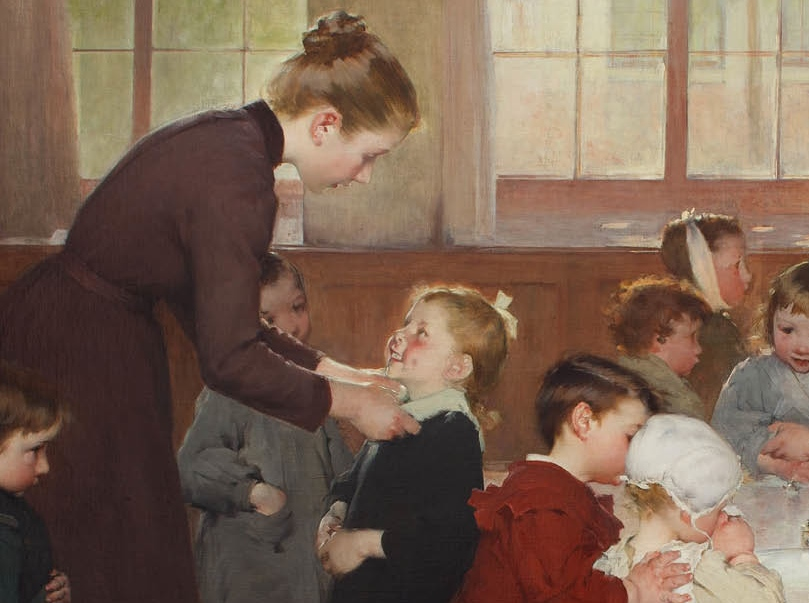
At School

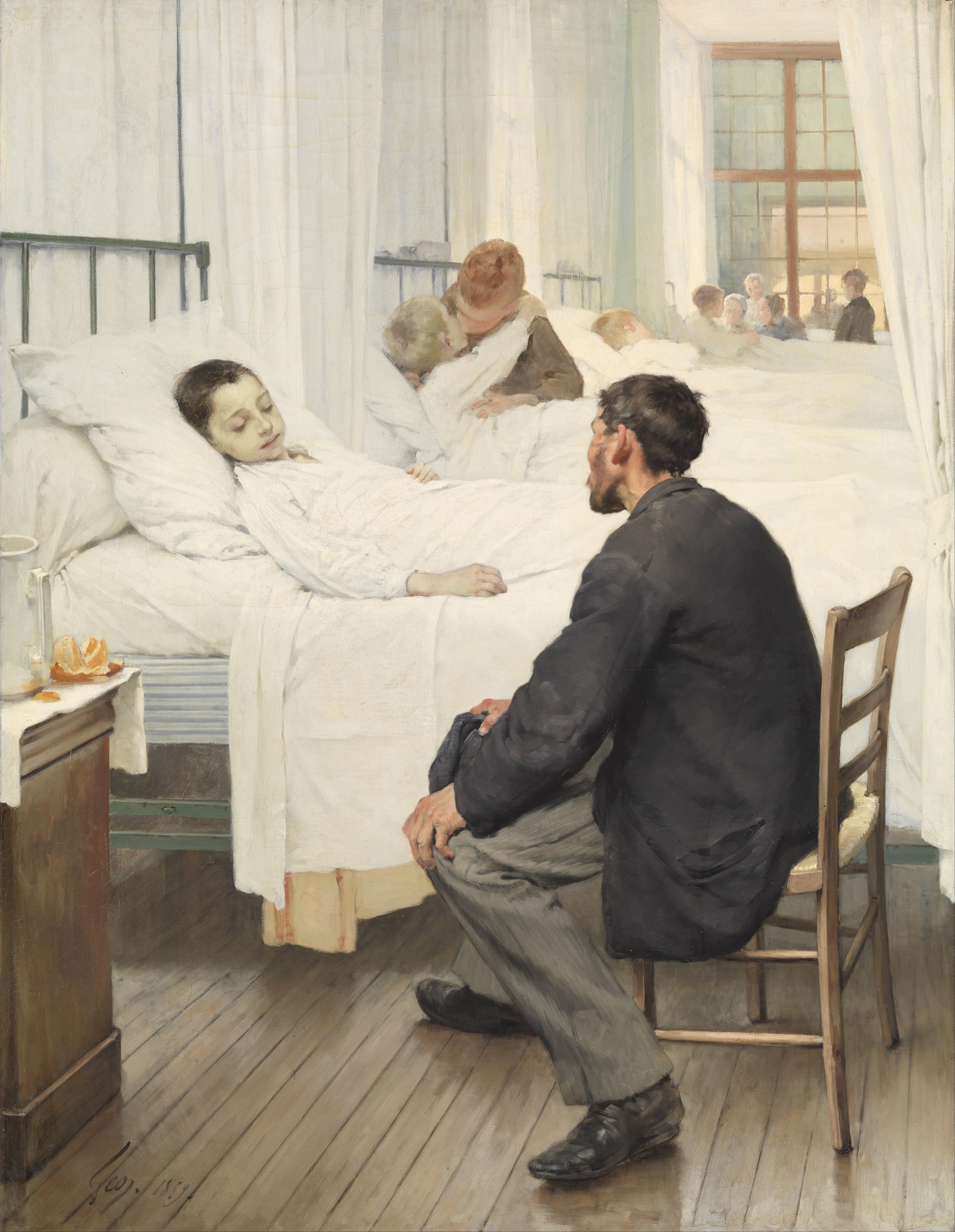
Visiting day at the hospital

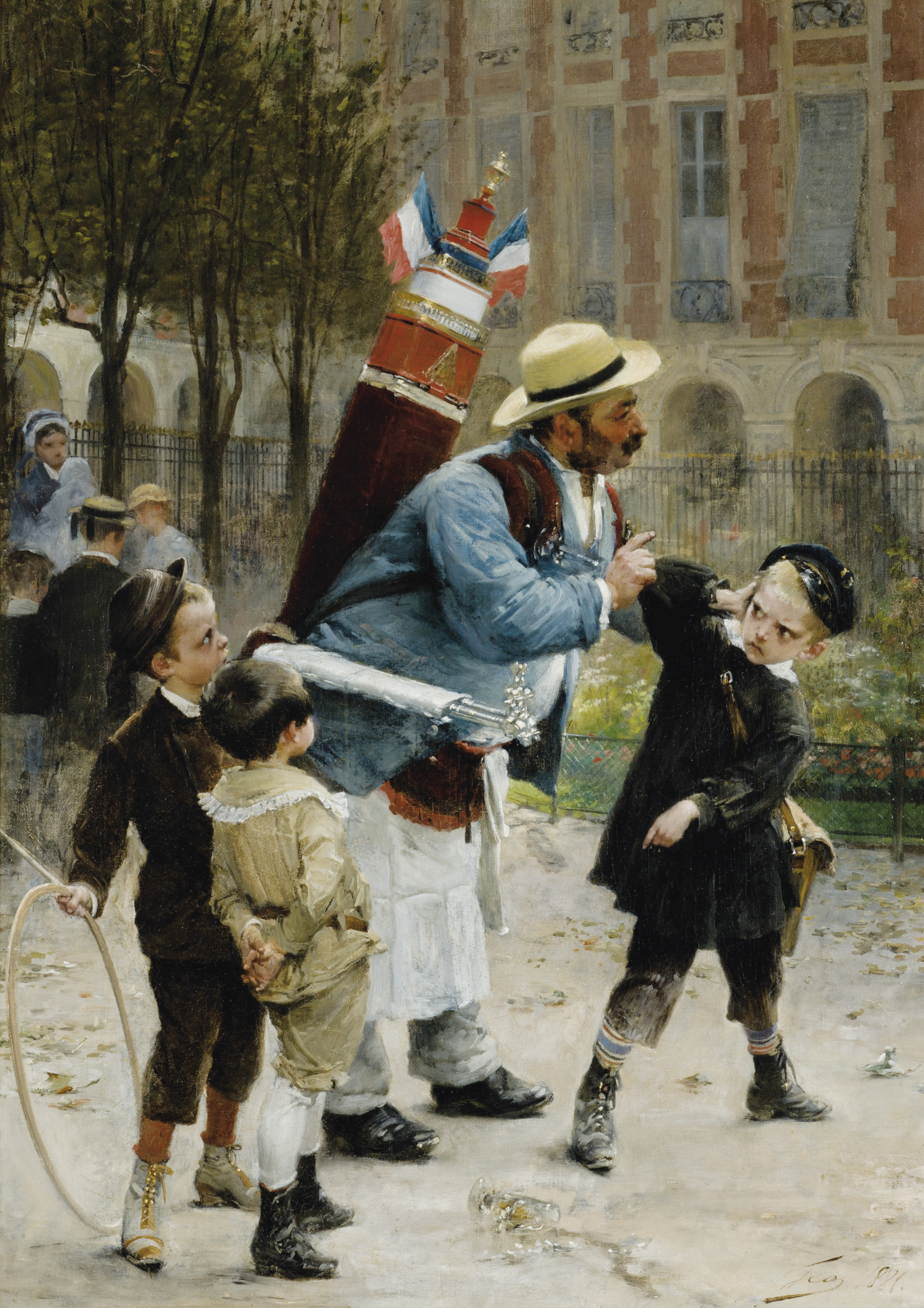
He Who Broke the Glass Will Pay!

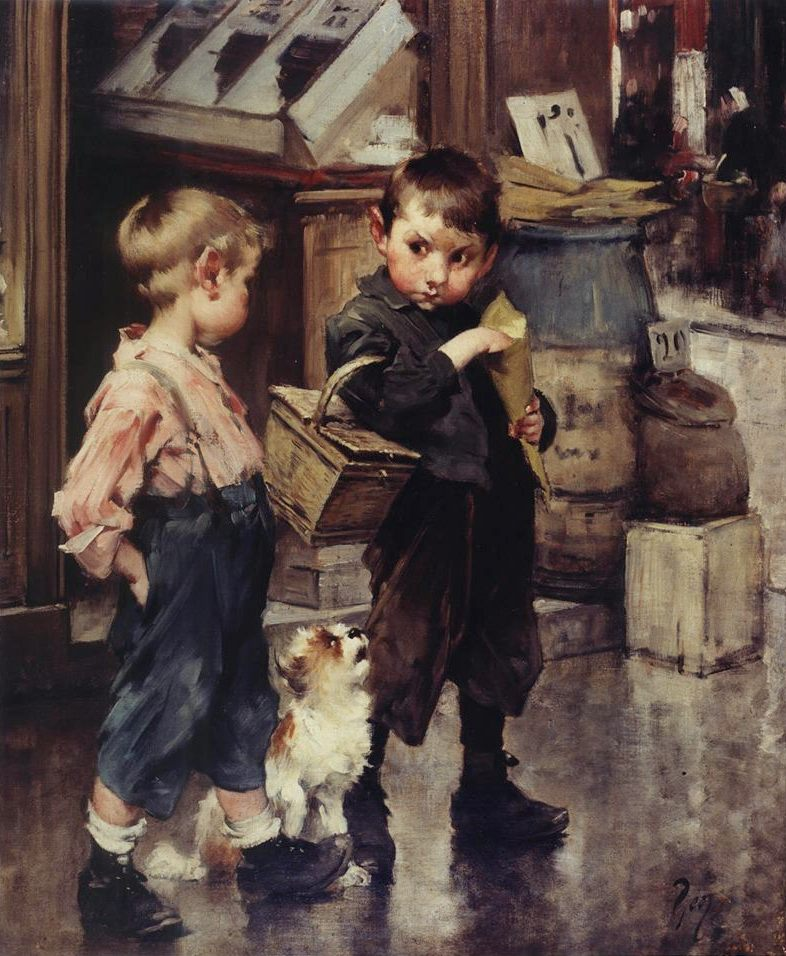
It's Hard to Share

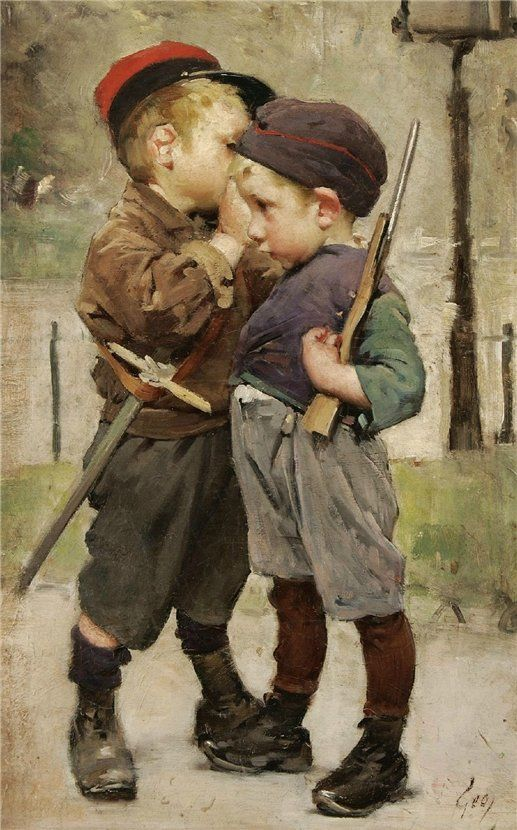
The Order

== See also ==
- L'Œuvre de la Goutte de Lait
