= Alain Viala =

French literary critic (1947–2021)

Alain Viala (1947 – 30 June 2021) was a sociologist and literature scholar, and a professor of French literature at the University of Oxford and at the University of Paris III and a fellow of Lady Margaret Hall, Oxford. He worked mainly on the French literature of the 17th century.

== Biography ==
Viala received his Agrégation de Lettres Modernes in 1971 and his PhD in 1983. He was known for his research on the sociology of literature and writing, inspired by Pierre Bourdieu (Naissance de l'écrivain, 1985) and his approach to reception studies, which he called "sociopoetic" (Approches de la réception, 1993). He has also written about theater, education, and literary theory.

Viala died on 30 June 2021 in Paris, at the age of 73.

== Publications ==
- La Culture littéraire (Paris, Presses universitaires de France, 2009)
- La France galante (Paris, Presses universitaires de France, collection "Les littéraires", 2008)
- With Dinah Ribard, Le Tragique, La Bibliothèque (Paris: Gallimard, 2002)
- With C. Jouhaud, De la publication (Paris: Fayard, 2002)
- With Paul Aron and Denis Saint-Jacques, Le dictionnaire du litteraire (Paris: P.U.F., 2002)
- "L'empire de l'Asie", in: Racine et l'Orient (Tübingen: Biblio 17, 2003), 12-135
- Lettre à Rousseau sur l'intérêt littéraire (Paris, Presses Universitaires de France, 2006)
- Histoire du théâtre (Paris, Presses Universitaires de France, 2006)
- Racine. La stratégie du caméléon (Paris, Seghers, 1990)
- Naissance de l'écrivain (Paris, Minuit, 1985)
- Argent, littérature et propagande: ecrivains du Roi-Soleil (1991)
