= Alain Baraton =

French gardener

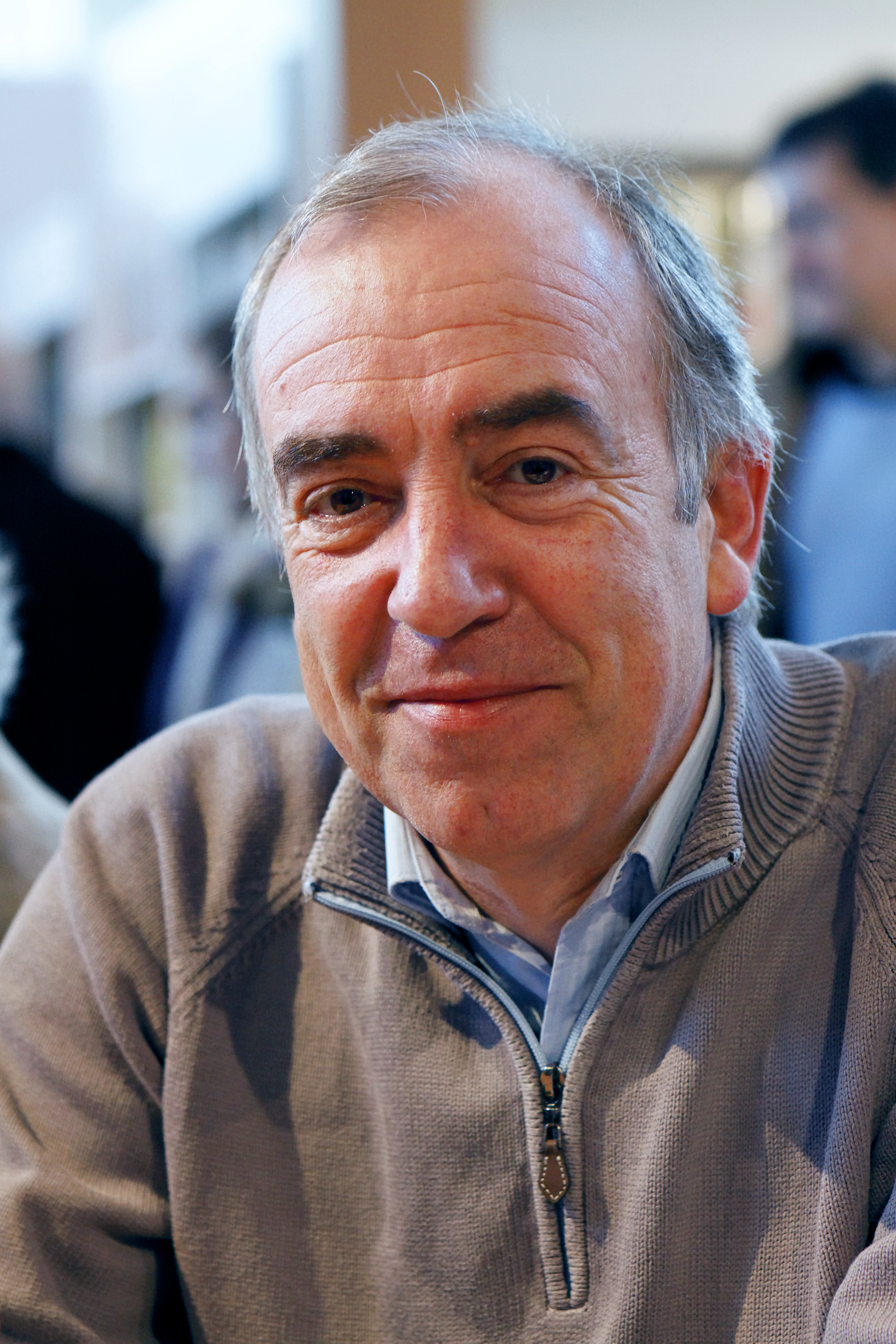
Alain Baraton 2011

Alain Baraton, born 10 September 1957 in La Celle-Saint-Cloud, is a master gardener. Since 1982, he has been gardener-in-chief of the park at the Palace of Versailles

He speaks regularly on radio France Inter and is the producer of the show La main verte, also broadcast on France Inter.

== Publications ==
- Le Monde des écorces, photographies de Christophe Madamour, Rodez, Éd. du Rouergue, 2003
- Le Monde des arbres d'ornement, photographies de Christophe Madamour, Rodez, Éd. du Rouergue, 2005
- Sagesse paysanne: 366 proverbes et dictons au rythme des saisons, photographies de Pierre Collombert, with Pierre Collombert, Romagnat, Éd. de Borée, 2005
- 1000 questions, 1000 réponses, Rodez, Éd. du Rouergue, 2006
- L'homme à la main verte: mes chroniques à France Inter, with Snezana Gerbault, Rodez, Éd. du Rouergue, 2006
- Le Jardinier de Versailles, Paris, B. Grasset, 2006
- Le Jardin de Versailles vu par Alain Baraton, Paris, Hugo image, 2007
- La Véritable Histoire des jardins de Versailles, with Jean-Pierre Coffe, Paris, Plon, 2007
- Savoir tout faire du bon jardinier, photographies de Vincent Motte, Paris, Flammarion, 2008
- L'Amour à Versailles, with Laure de Chantal, Paris, B. Grasset, 2009
- Les Parterres de Le Nôtre, Paris, N. Chaudun, Fondation pour le Domaine de Chantilly, 2009
- Je plante, donc je suis, Paris, Grasset, 2010
- Walks in the Gardens of Versailles, Editions Artlys, 2010 (ISBN 978-2-85495-398-5)
- Vice et Versailles – Crimes, trahisons et autres empoisonnements au palais du Roi-Soleil, Paris, B. Grasset, 2011
- Dictionnaire amoureux des jardins, Paris, Plon, 2012 (ISBN 2-259-20856-8)
- La Haine de l'arbre n'est pas une fatalité, Arles, Actes Sud, 2013 (ISBN 978-2-330-02385-0)
- L'Amour au jardin, Paris, B. Grasset, 2014

== Other projects ==
Media related to Alain Baraton at Wikimedia Commons
