= Alain Amougou =

Cameroonian footballer

Personal information
- Full name: Alain Sylvain Amougou
- Date of birth: 6 September 1973 (age 53)
- Place of birth: Yaounde, Cameroon
- Position: Striker

Senior career*
Years	Team	Apps	(Gls)
–1999	SS Saint-Louisienne		
1999–2002	Mamelodi Sundowns FC		
2002	Metalist Kharkiv	4	(0)
- * Club domestic league appearances and goals

Alain Sylvain Amougou (Ukrainian: Ален Сільвен Амугу born 6 September 1973 in Yaounde, Cameroon) is a Cameroonian retired professional footballer.

== Career ==
=== South Africa ===
Recruited by Mamelodi Sundowns of the South African Premier Division for 1999/00, Amougou racked 15 goals that season, showing the ability of his left foot but his next two years at Chloorkop were plagued by injuries and other problems.

Speculation about him being arrested abated when he was called to front the Sundowns' attack in the first round of the 2000 CAF Champions League.

=== Ukraine ===
Reinforcing Metalist Kharkiv of the Ukrainian Premier League in 2002, the first African to be in the club, the Cameroonian racked 4 league and 1 cup outing there, debuting on 27 July in a 1–1 tie with Obolon before being released by the end 2002. Two reasons for his release are that he did not lineup to expectations and that he did not like the Ukrainian environment.

=== Sweden ===
Set to complete a move to IFK Norrköping of the Swedish Allsvenskan in 2002, Peking rejected the forward, causing him to return home.
