= Alain Koudou =

Ivorian footballer

Arunina
Personal information
- Full name: Alain Koudou
- Date of birth: 21 October 1984 (age 42)
- Place of birth: Abidjan, Ivory Coast
- Height: 1.72 m (5 ft 8 in)
- Position: Striker

Youth career
- –2004: Académie de Sol Beni

Senior career*
Years	Team	Apps	(Gls)
2004	ASEC Mimosas		
2005–2007	Beveren	49	(6)
2007–2008	Charleroi-Marchienne	15	(2)
2008–2009	Visé	23	(3)
2009–2010	Red Star Saint-Ouen		
2010–2011	USJA Carquefou	12	(1)
2012–2013	USSA Vertou	22	(8)
2013–2014	SO Romorantin	26	(7)
2014–2016	USSA Vertou	23	(1)
- * Club domestic league appearances and goals

Alain Koudou (born 21 October 1984), commonly known as Arunina, is an Ivorian former professional footballer who played as a striker.

== Career ==
Koudou began his career in the Académie de Sol Beni was 2004 promoted to ASEC Mimosas where he scored 17 goals in 13 games. In January 2005 he moved to Belgium-based club KSK Beveren where he played for three years. After a one-year stint with R.O.C. de Charleroi-Marchienne he joined C.S. Visé on 1 September 2008.
