= Alain Lestié =

French painter and writer (born 1944)

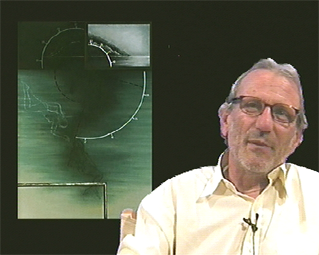
Portrait of Alain Lestié

Alain Lestié is a French painter and writer, born in Hossegor in 1944, who lives and works in Cannes and in Paris.

Since the end of the 1960s, Alain Lestié's work has been a reflection on the critical dimension of painting.

== Recent exhibitions ==
2022

- "Scattered Moments" Topic Gallery, Saint-Raphaël until May 12
- "Detached Stances" Depardieu Gallery, Nice

2021

- "from time to time" GaG Gallery, Bordeaux
- "3 times the measure" (B.Maire): Galerie Meessen De Clercq, Brussels
