= Allen =

Allen, Allen's or Allens may refer to:

== Buildings ==
- Allen Arena, an indoor arena at Lipscomb University in Nashville, Tennessee
- Allen Center, a skyscraper complex in downtown Houston, Texas
- Allen Fieldhouse, an indoor sports arena on the University of Kansas campus in Lawrence
- Allen House (disambiguation)
- Allen Power Plant (disambiguation)

== Businesses ==
- Allen (brand), an American tool company
- Allen's, an Australian brand of confectionery
- Allens (law firm), an Australian law firm formerly known as Allens Arthur Robinson
- Allen's (restaurant), a former hamburger joint and nightclub in Athens, Georgia, United States
- Allen & Company LLC, a small, privately held investment bank
- Allens of Mayfair, a butcher shop in London from 1830 to 2015
- Allens Boots, a retail store in Austin, Texas
- Allens, Inc., a brand of canned vegetables based in Arkansas, US, now owned by Del Monte
- Allen's department store, a.k.a. Allen's, George Allen, Inc., Philadelphia, USA
- Allen Career Institute, a coaching institute for competitive exams in India

== People ==
- Allen (surname), a list of people
- Allen (given name), a list of people and fictional characters
- The Allen Brothers (Australia), a 1960s cabaret act

== Places ==
- Mount Allen (disambiguation)

=== Ireland ===
- Lough Allen, a lake
- Allen, County Kildare, a village
- Hill of Allen, County Kildare
- Bog of Allen

=== United Kingdom ===
- River Allen (disambiguation), four rivers, all in England
- Allen, a townland of County Tyrone, Northern Ireland

=== United States ===
- Allen, Alabama, an unincorporated community in Clarke County, Alabama
- Allen, Arizona, a ghost town
- Allen, Kansas, a city
- Allen, Kentucky, a city
- Allen, Louisiana, an unincorporated community
- Allen, Maryland, an unincorporated community
- Allen, Michigan, a village
- Allen, Mississippi, an unincorporated community
- Allen, Nebraska, a village
- Allens, an alternate name for Allens Station, New Jersey, an unincorporated community
- Allen, New York, a town
- Allen, Oklahoma, a town
- Allen, South Dakota, a census-designated place
- Allen, Texas, a city
- Allen, West Virginia, an unincorporated community
- Allen, Wisconsin, an unincorporated community
- Allen Township (disambiguation)
- Allen County (disambiguation)
- Allen Parish, Louisiana
- Allen Mountain (Montana)
- Allen Mountain (New York)
- Allen Island (Maine)
- Allen Parkway, a major street in Houston, Texas
- Allens Bay, Minnesota

=== Elsewhere ===
- Allen, Río Negro, Argentina, a city
- Allen Island, Queensland, Australia
- Allen Island (Nunavut), Canada
- Allen, Northern Samar, Philippines, a municipality
- Allen Rocks, Ross Island, Antarctica

== Film and television ==
- Allen (film), a 2026 Australian film
- "Allen" (Prison Break), an episode of the TV series Prison Break
- "Allen" (Aqua Unit Patrol Squad 1), a two-part episode of the television series Aqua Teen Hunger Force

== Museums ==
- Allen Memorial Art Museum, museum in Oberlin, Ohio
- Museu Allen, 19th-century museum in Porto, Portugal

== Schools ==
- Allen Community College, a junior college in Iola, Kansas
- Allen High School (disambiguation)
- Allen University, a private, coeducational historically black university in Columbia, South Carolina

== Transportation ==
- Allen (1913 Ohio automobile), an early American automobile
- Allen (1913 Philadelphia automobile), an early American automobile
- Allen Parkway, Houston, Texas, U.S.
- Allen Road, Toronto, Canada
- Allen station (Los Angeles Metro), a freeway-median light rail station in Pasadena, California, U.S.
- Allen station (Texas Electric Railway), a former interurban station in Allen, Texas, U.S.
- Allen station (Waterloo), a street-median light rail station in Waterloo, Ontario, Canada
- Allen Street, Manhattan, New York, U.S.

== Other uses ==
- Allen (robot), a 1980s robot
- Allen baronets, two extinct titles, one in the Baronetage of England and one in the Baronetage of the United Kingdom
- Allen Army Air Field, Fort Greely, Alaska
- Allen Telescope Array, California
- Allen's interval algebra, a calculus for temporal reasoning
- Allen's Coffee Brandy, a liqueur
- Hurricane Allen (1980)
- Allen (collaborative projects), several heavy metal music projects centered around Russell Allen
- Allen's hummingbird, a bird native to the Western United States.

== See also ==
- Van Allen (disambiguation)
- Justice Allen (disambiguation)
- Alan (disambiguation)
- Alen (given name)
- Allan (disambiguation)
- Alleine
- Alleyn
- Allyn
