= Alanus =

Alanus may refer to:

== People ==
- Alan Rufus (c. 1040–1093), Alanus Rufus in Latin, Breton noble, kinsman and companion of William the Conqueror and first lord of Richmond
- Alan the Black (died 1098), Alanus Niger in Latin, second lord of Richmond, brother of Alan Rufus
- Alain de Lille (1116/7–1202/3), Alanus ab Insulis in Latin, French theologian and poet
- Alanus of Walkingham, Attorney General from 1280 to 1281
- Alain Chartier (1385–1430), French poet, diplomat and political writer
- Alan of Lynn or Alanus de Lynna (c. 1348–1420s), English theologian
- Alanus de Rupe (c. 1428–1475), French theologian
- Johannes Alanus (fl. late 14th or early 15th century), English composer
- William Allen (cardinal) (1532–1594), also known as Guilielmus Alanus or Gulielmus Alanus, English Catholic cardinal

== Other uses ==
- Alanus University of Arts and Social Sciences, a private university in North Rhine-Westphalia, Germany

== See also ==
- Alan (disambiguation)
- Alaunus
- Alain (disambiguation)
- Allain
- Allan (disambiguation)
- Allen (disambiguation)
- Alleine
- Alun (disambiguation)
