= Alline =

Alline is a personal name, usually feminine when used as a given name.

== Notable people ==
=== Given name ===
- Alline Bullock (1936–2010), American songwriter
- Alline Calandrini (born 1988), Brazilian sports journalist
- Alline E. Marcy (1868–1912), American lawyer
- Alline Banks Sprouse (1921–2018), American basketball player

=== Surname ===
- Anna L. Alline (1864–1934), American nurse and nursing educator
- Henry Alline (1748–1784), American minister and writer; his name was also written as Allin or Allen

== See also ==
- Aline
- Alina
- Allin
- Allyn
