= Allin =

Allin is both a surname and a given name. Notable people with the name include:

Surname:

- Buddy Allin (1944–2007), American golfer
- GG Allin (1956–1993), punk rock singer-songwriter and musician
- Merle Allin (born 1953), American bassist
- Norman Allin (1884–1973), British bass singer
- Roger Allin (1848–1936), American politician
- Rosena Allin-Khan, British politician
- Sir Thomas Allin, 1st Baronet (17th century), English naval officer

Given name:

- Allin Braund (1915–2004), British artist
- Allin H. Pierce (1897–1980), American judge
- Eric Allin Cornell (born 1961), American physicist

== See also ==
- Alan (disambiguation)
- Alen (given name)
- Allan (disambiguation)
- Alleine
- Allen (disambiguation)
- Allín
- Allin baronets
- Allin Township
