= Allyn =

Allyn is both a unisex given name and a surname. Notable people with the name include:

Given name

- Leigh-Allyn Baker (born 1972), American actress, director and voice artist
- Allyn L. Brown (1883–1973), American judge
- Allyn Capron (1846–1898), US Army captain
- Allyn K. Capron (1871–1898), first US Army officer to die in the Spanish–American War
- Allyn Condon (born 1974), English sprinter
- Allyn Cox (1896–1982), American painter
- Allyn Sue Danzeisen, American–New Zealand community leader
- Allyn Ferguson (1924–2010), American composer
- Allyn Joslyn (1901–1981), American stage, film and television actor
- Ruth Allyn Marcus (born 1958), American journalist and political commentator
- Allyn McKeen (1905–1978), American college football coach
- Allyn Ann McLerie (1926–2018), American dancer
- Francis Allyn Olmsted (1819–1844), American author
- Wayne Allyn Root (born 1961), American businessperson
- Allyn Rose (born 1988), American beauty pageant titleholder and model
- J. Allyn Rosser (born 1957), American poet
- Allyn Stout (1904–1974), American Major League baseball pitcher
- Allyn Vine (1914–1994), American physicist and oceanographer
- Allyn Abbott Young (1876–1929), American economist

Surname

- Arthur Allyn Jr. (1913–1985), American co-owner of the Chicago White Sox baseball team
- Daniel B. Allyn (born 1959), US Army general
- David Allyn (born 1969), American essayist
- Edna Allyn (1861–1927), American librarian
- Eunice Eloisae Gibbs Allyn (1847–1916), American writer
- Jerri Allyn (born 1954), American artist
- John Allyn (1917–1979), American co-owner of the Chicago White Sox baseball team
- Joseph P. Allyn (1833–1869), American judge and journalist
- Louis B. Allyn (1874–1940), American chemistry professor

== Geographic names ==
- Allyn, Washington, unincorporated community in Washington, United States
- Allyn-Grapeview, census-designated place (CDP) in Mason County, Washington, United States
- Allyn Range, a mountain range in New South Wales, Australia
  - Mount Allyn, a mountain with an elevation of 1,125 metres (3,691 ft) AHD that is part of the Allyn Range.
  - Allyn River, a stream on Allyn Range in the Hunter region of New South Wales, Australia.

== See also ==
- Allan (disambiguation)
- Allen (disambiguation)
- Alleyn
