= Alan =

Alan may refer to:

== People ==
- Alan (surname), an English and Turkish surname
- Alan (given name), an English given name
  - List of people with given name Alan

Following are people commonly referred to solely by "Alan" or by a homonymous name.

- Alan (Chinese singer) (born 1987), female Chinese singer of Tibetan ethnicity, active in both China and Japan
- Alan (Mexican singer) (born 1973), Mexican singer and actor
- Alan (wrestler) (born 1975), a.k.a. Gato Eveready, who wrestles in Asistencia Asesoría y Administración
- Alan (footballer, born 1979) (Alan Osório da Costa Silva), Brazilian footballer
- Alan (footballer, born 1998) (Alan Cardoso de Andrade), Brazilian footballer
- Alan I, King of Brittany (died 907), "the Great"
- Alan II, Duke of Brittany (c. 900–952)
- Alan III, Duke of Brittany(997–1040)
- Alan IV, Duke of Brittany (c. 1063–1119), a.k.a. Alan Fergant ("the Younger" in Breton language)
- Alan of Tewkesbury, 12th century abbott
- Alan of Lynn (c. 1348–1423), 15th century monk

=== Saint Alan or Alain ===
- Alan of Lavaur, or Elan
- Alain de la Roche (c. 1428–1475), or Alanus de Rupe, canonized saint, "Alan of the Rock"
- Alain de Solminihac (1593-1659), French Catholic religious reformer and bishop of Cahors

=== Fictional characters ===
- Alan (Sesame Street) in the television series Sesame Street
- Alan Partridge, a comedy character portrayed by Steve Coogan
- Alan (Modern Toss) in the television series Modern Toss
- Alan "Squid", a character in the novel Holes and its film adaption
- Alan, the main antagonist in the video game Kya: Dark Lineage
- Alan Parrish, the main character in the 1995 film Jumanji

== Places ==
- Alan, Haute-Garonne, a commune in France
- Alan, Iran (disambiguation), places in Iran
- Alan, Russia, name of several rural localities in Russia
- Alan, Şemdinli, a village in Turkey
- Alan, Croatia, a village near Senj

== Other meanings ==
- ALAN, an Italian bicycle manufacturer
- ALAN (Artificial Light At Night), a form of Ecological light pollution
- ALAN (The Assembly on Literature for Adolescents), a teachers organization in the United States
- Alan (automobile), a short-lived German automobile
- Alan (crater), a crater on the Moon within Catena Davy
- Alan (legendary creature), a race of winged spirits from Tinguian folklore
- Alans, nomadic tribes from Asia who migrated westward in late antiquity
- Cyclone Alan, a tropical storm

== See also ==
- Alans, an ancient and medieval Iranian nomadic pastoral people of the North Caucasus
- Alen (disambiguation)
- Allan (disambiguation)
- Alleine
- Allen (disambiguation)
