= Allen Township, Kansas =

Allen Township, Kansas may refer to:

- Allen Township, Jewell County, Kansas
- Allen Township, Kingman County, Kansas

== See also ==
- List of Kansas townships
- Allen Township (disambiguation)
