= Carmelite Friary, King's Lynn =

Friary in Norfolk, England

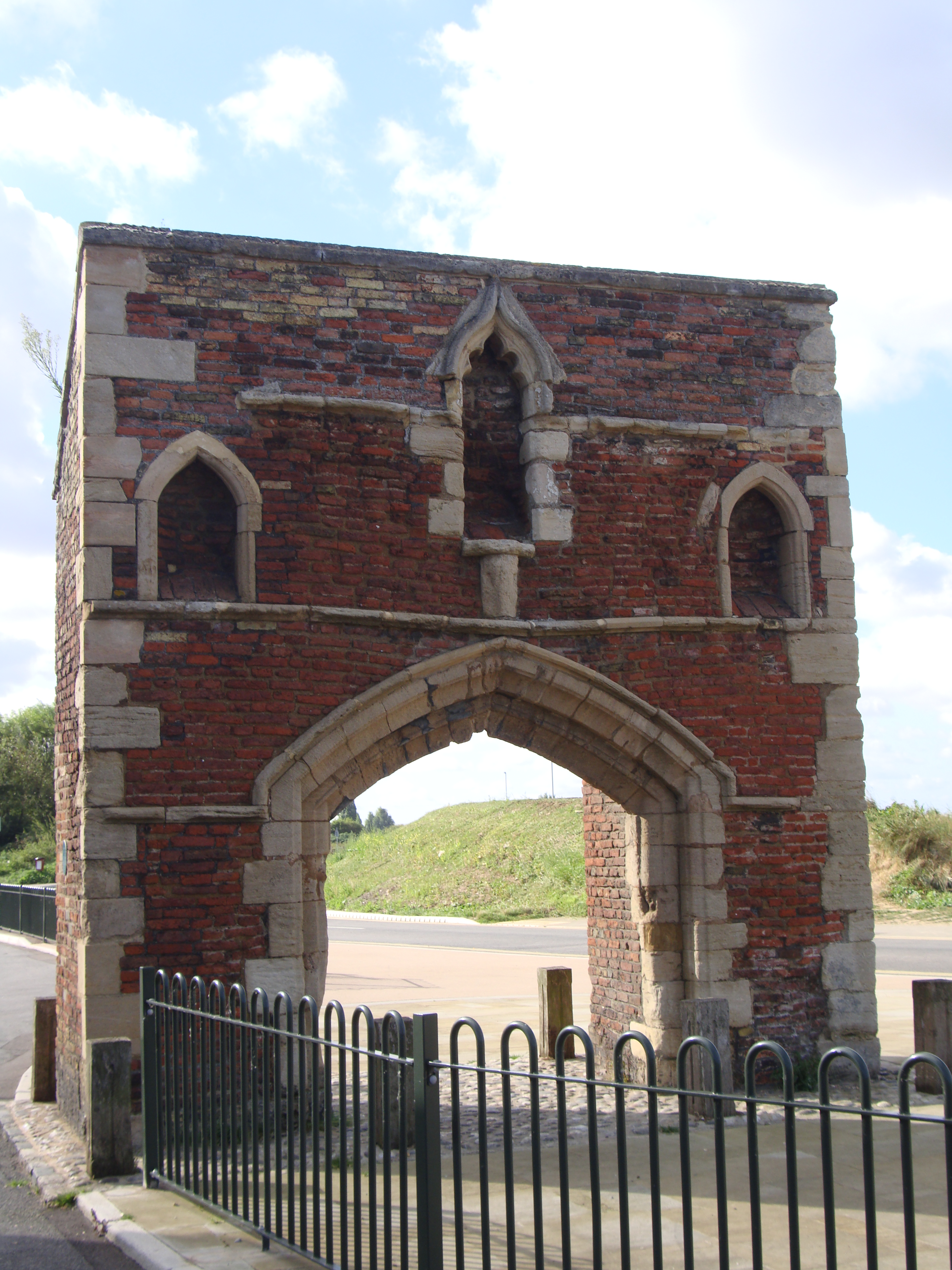
The remains (the gatehouse) of the Carmelite friary, King's Lynn, Norfolk

The Carmelite Friary, King's Lynn, also Whitefriars, King's Lynn, was a friary of the Carmelites in King's Lynn, Norfolk, England. It was founded before 1261; according to Francis Blomefield, the county historian, the founder was William Bardolf (died 1275), whose descendant, William Bardolf, Lord Bardolf, was buried there. In the early part of the 15th century the theologian and preacher Alan of Lynn (died after 1420) was a member of the community. The friary was dissolved in 1538.

The northern gateway is the only significant survival from the buildings.

== Burials ==
- Alan of Lynn
- William Bardolf, 4th Baron Bardolf

== See also ==
- List of monastic houses in Norfolk
