= State Normal School (Athens, Georgia) =

Defunct American teaching college

Coordinates: 33°57.85′N 83°24.15′W

Postcard of State Normal School auditorium and James M. Smith building, Athens, Georgia, 1912.

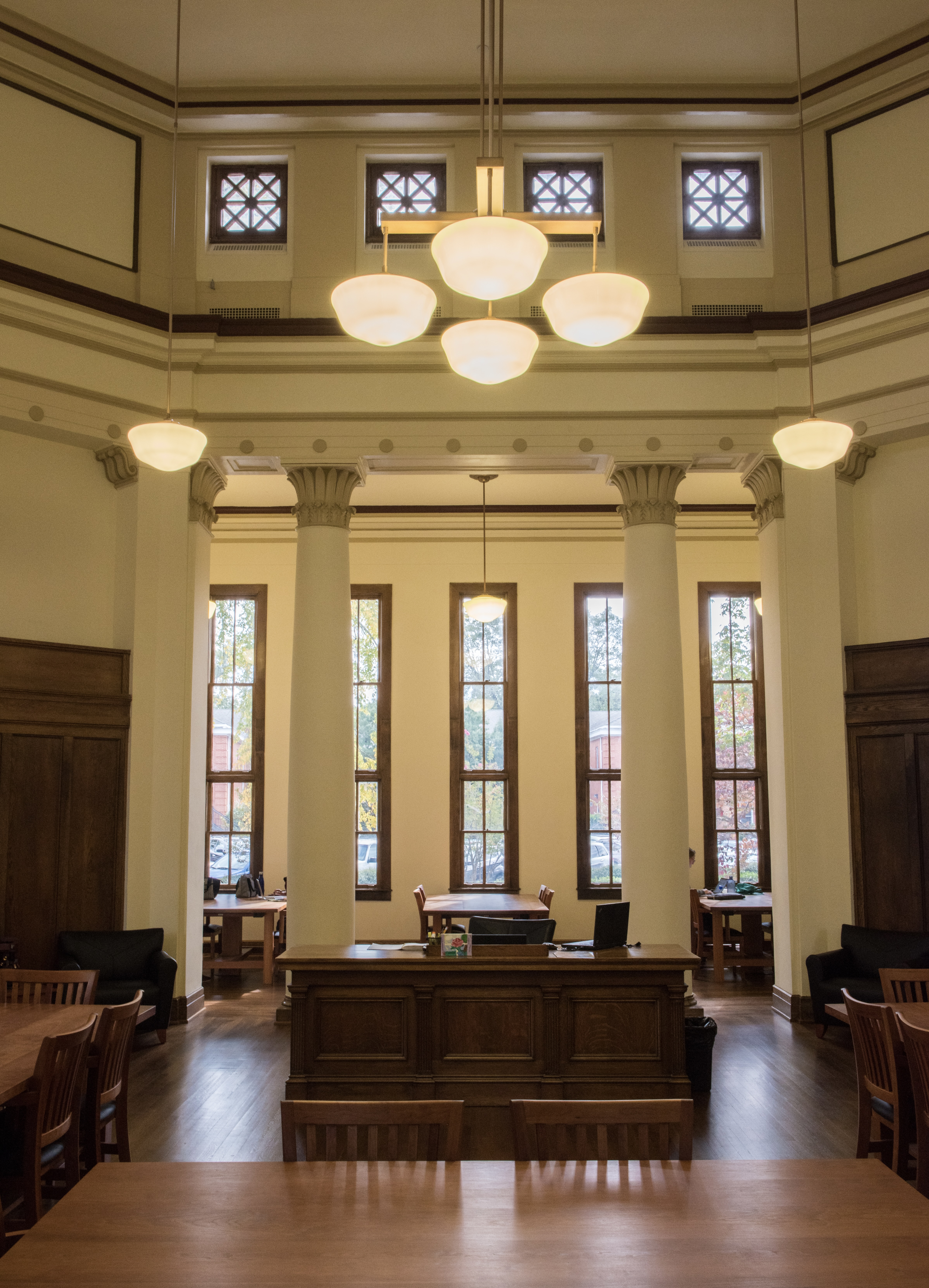
Carnegie Library Building (Athens, Georgia)

From the State Normal School Archival collection at the Athens-Clarke County Library Heritage Room

The State Normal School was a teaching college located in Athens, Georgia, United States, founded in 1891, whose function was later incorporated into the curricula of the University of Georgia. The institution first opened in a university-owned facility but later moved to its own facility on Prince Avenue in an area that became known as "Normaltown."

In 1932 the University of Georgia's Department of Education assumed control of training for teachers in the state. The normal school was taken over by the University of Georgia and became known as Coordinate College. It was used only as dormitories for freshmen and sophomore women.

In the 1950s, the complex was taken over by the Navy for the Supply Corps School. The Navy turned over the property to the University of Georgia in 2010.

In January 2012, it became the UGA Health Sciences Campus, a partnership with the Georgia Health Sciences University in Augusta.

== Statewide spread of the State Normal School ==
By 1907, there was also a normal school in Milledgeville, Georgia.
