= Mount Allan =

Mount Allan is the name of several places:

== Places ==
In Antarctica

- Mount Allan (Antarctica)

In Australia

- Mount Allan station, Northern Territory, a former pastoral lease on which Yuelamu is located (also spelt Allen)

In Canada

- Mount Allan (Canada), a mountain which is the site of the Nakiska ski resort

In New Zealand

- Mount Allan (New Zealand), in The Silverpeaks, a range in the Otago Region

== See also ==
- Mount Allen (disambiguation)
