= Mount Allen =

Mount Allen is the name of several places and things worldwide:

== Places ==
=== Antarctica ===
- Mount Allen (Ellsworth Mountains)
- Mount Allen (Victoria Land)

=== Australia ===
- Mount Allen, New South Wales
- Mount Allen station, Northern Territory, a former pastoral lease on which Yuelamu is located (also spelt Allan)

=== Canada ===
- Mount Allen (Canada), a mountain located on the Continental Divide and British Columbia-Alberta border in Canada

=== New Zealand ===
- Mount Allen (Otago), in the Criffel Range
- Mount Allen (Stewart Island)

=== United States ===
- Mount Allen (Alaska), in Wrangell Mountains
- Mount Allen, also known as Sandstone Peak, in the Santa Monica Mountains, California

== Other uses ==
- Mount Allen Junior College, former name of Mount Olive College, North Carolina

== See also ==
- Mount Allan (disambiguation)
- Allen Mountain (disambiguation)
- Allen Peak
- Mount Allen Young, Antarctica
