= James Allen (Army engineer) =

U.S. Army officer

James Allen (February 15, 1806 – August 23, 1846) was a U.S. Army officer who organized the Mormon Battalion and was commander of Fort Des Moines (1843–1846), the fort from which the City of Des Moines grew. He was also in charge of improvements to the harbor of Chicago as well as producing maps of the U.S. frontier.

Allen was born in Ohio. He graduated from West Point in 1829. In 1832, he accompanied Henry Schoolcraft on an expedition to the headwaters of the Mississippi River, which led to Allen producing the first accurate map showing the lakes and streams of the headwaters. In 1833 he was assigned to the First Regiment of Dragoons, where he served as an engineer in the exploration of the Indian country of the Southwest. Allen oversaw improvements to the harbor of Chicago in 1834. In 1842 he was transferred to Iowa, taking charge of the Sac and Fox Agency ("Fort Sanford") and then Fort Des Moines No. 2. After Fort Des Moines No. 2 was abandoned in 1846, it became the core of what is now the modern City of Des Moines.

He was sent to Mt. Pisgah, Iowa, to a camp of homeless Latter-day Saints who had been driven from their homes by anti-Mormon mobs, to recruit a battalion of 500 men to fight in the Mexican–American War. Initially the Mormons were suspicious of him, but after he met with Mormon leader Brigham Young, Young fully endorsed the plan.

Allen served as the commanding officer (with the acting rank of lieutenant colonel) of the Battalion from the July 16, 1846 until his death on August 23, 1846. He was the first officer buried at Fort Leavenworth National Cemetery.

== Namesake ==
- Allens Bay on Cass Lake in the State of Minnesota is named in his honor.

== Sources ==
- Encyclopedia of Latter-day Saint History, p. 19
- The Mormon Battalion, U.S. Army of the West, p. 11
- The Rise of the Allens, Two Soldiers and the Master of Terrace Hill,
