= Burraga Swamp =

Swamp in New South Wales, Australia

Coordinates: 32°6.554′S 151°25.64′E

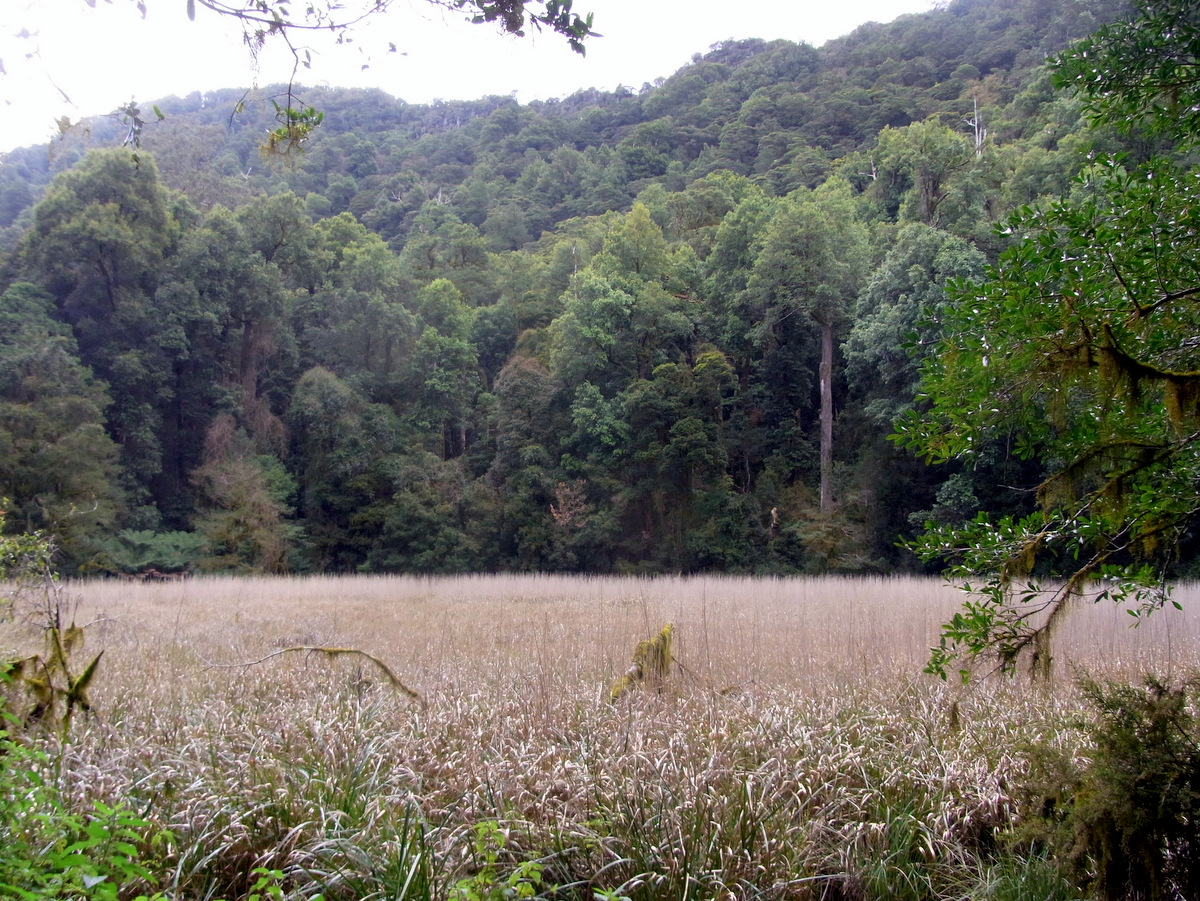
Antarctic beech rainforest surrounding Burraga Swamp

Burraga Swamp is situated beside Mount Lumeah in the Barrington Tops area in New South Wales, Australia. It is surrounded by Antarctic beech cool temperate rainforest at an altitude of 985 metres above sea level.

The swamp and surrounding forest was part of Chichester State Forest. However, in the 1980s the boundaries of the Barrington Tops National Park were moved to include the area to the World Heritage Gondwana Rainforests of Australia.

The adjacent forest contains very tall Antarctic beech trees, some as old as 2000 years. Mosses and ferns are prominent. Other tree species near the lake include golden sassafras, soft corkwood, prickly ash, possumwood and mountain walnut.

The swamp was formed when a landslide fell from the western side of Mount Lumeah. The area initially filled as a lake. Then the basin filled with organic and sedimentary material. The swamp is vegetated by a variety of sedges and grasses.

The swamp is of interest to palaeobotanists as the pollen records reveal a history of previous vegetation and clues to an earlier climate. Pollen samples indicated the dominance of the Antarctic beech for only 6,000 years at this site. 17,000 years ago at the Last Glacial Maximum this area was much colder and with a lower rainfall. soft tree ferns became common 13,000 years ago. Nothofagus appeared around 11,500 years ago and has only dominated the area for a surprisingly short period when the rainfall and temperatures were higher. The pollen sampling gives a good indication of the botany of the area for the past 40,000 years. In the colder days of the Last Glacial Maximum, the vegetation was mostly drier alpine plants.
