= Museu Allen =

Former museum in Porto, Portugal (1836–1905)

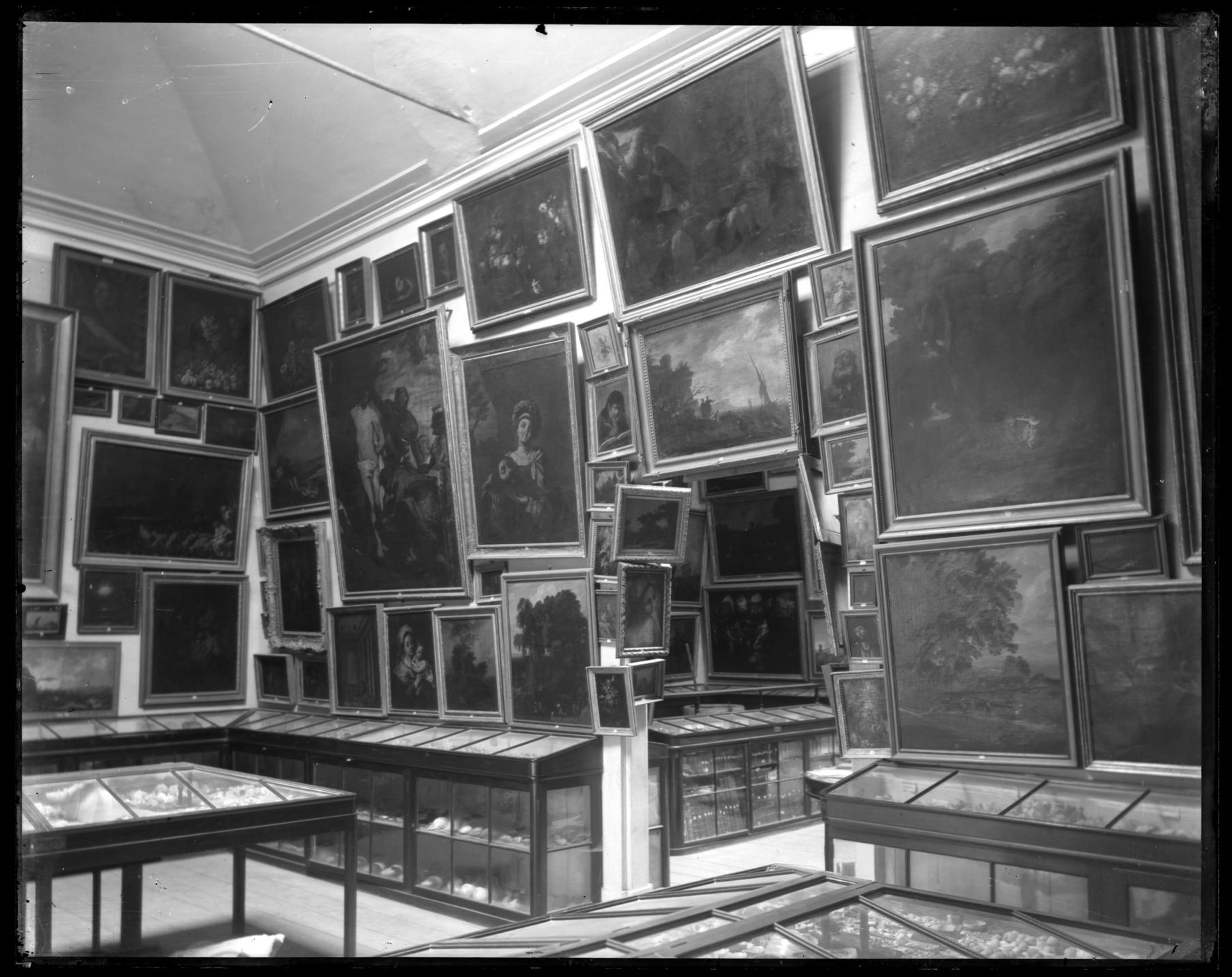
- 1902 interior view of the Museu Allen

- The former location of the Museu Allen in Porto
- Established: 1836
- Dissolved: 1905
- Location: Miragaia, Porto, Portugal
- Coordinates: 41°8′44″N 8°37′26″W
- Type: Covered a variety of disciplines
- Collections: Paintings, Ceramics, Sculpture, Engravings, Epigraphs, Natural History
- Founder: John Francis Allen
- Owners: John Francis Allen and family

Museu Allen (Allen Museum), also referred to as the Museu da Restauração (Restoration Museum) and the Museu Portuense da Rua da Restauração, was located in the parish of Miragaia, in the city and district of Porto, in Portugal. The first museum in Porto to offer public admission, it was dedicated to the exhibition of collections of art, natural history, epigraphs and other items owned by John Francis Allen (1781-1848), a wealthy port wine dealer, whose collection was, at the time, considered the best private collection in the country.

== John Allen ==
John Allen was a Porto businessman of British descent who was born in Viana do Castelo, Portugal and educated from the age of 12 in Washington D.C., travelling widely throughout the US. He fought in the Peninsular War when France invaded Portugal, commanding a company of volunteers during the rebellion against the French in Porto in 1808. His business activities centred on the export of port wine and he lived in London between 1815 and 1821 to conduct that trade, before returning to Porto. He was a member of the British Factory, an organization of business people who were mainly port exporters, and co-founder of Banco Comercial do Porto (Commercial Bank of Porto) and the Commercial Association of Porto.

== History of the museum ==
Allen's travels throughout Europe, especially Italy, starting with his first Grand Tour to Italy in 1826 and 1827, combined with his wealth enabled this eclectic collector to build up a private collection of art, weapons, coins and medals, works in gold, crockery, Egyptian, Greek and Roman antiquities, 20,000 mollusc shells and various curiosities. He was particularly interested in ancient and contemporary paintings, which initially formed the bulk of his collection, purchasing canvases by Domingos Sequeira, Vieira Portuense, Joaquim Rafael, the French Rococo painter Jean-Baptiste Pillement, François Clouet, Jacob Jordaens, Jan Fyt, Alonso Sánchez Coello, Giuseppe Cades, and Sebastiano Bombelli, among many others. His museum had 599 paintings. Allen's collection of Portuguese coins was said to have been bettered only by the King. Among the curiosities was said to be some of the hair of Inês de Castro, the lover of King Pedro I of Portugal.

As his collection grew, including as a result of the purchase of an entire collection of flora and fauna specimens, Allen's home proved incapable of housing all the works he owned, let alone displaying them adequately. After the Siege of Porto (1832-1833), during the Portuguese civil war, in which his house at 281 Rua da Restauração luckily remained unscathed, he decided to build an annex to his residence to house the collection. Construction began in 1836, with the museum consisting of three large halls receiving direct light through skylights in the ceiling. Every Sunday, Allen would personally guide visitors around the museum, with entry being free. It was opened on other days of the week for artists and scholars.

== Reaction ==
The reaction to the museum among the public was one of surprise. People had no idea that in Porto there could be such a collection, which they believed to rival the best in the world. The main criticism of the museum was that there was no theme to the presentation of exhibits and that it was more of a warehouse than a museum, with all sorts of items mixed together. Instead of a room of paintings, there would be a room with paintings mixed with prehistoric items, busts, industrial items, Chinese fans, and stuffed animals. There was no attempt to select items for specific exhibitions and keep the remainder in storage, and the walls were completely covered with paintings. Nevertheless, the quality of the items he had purchased was widely praised.

== Purchase by the city ==
Unfortunately, by the mid-1840s, Allen's business began to deteriorate, largely related to problems with one of his partners, who sold wine on credit from the London office and did not receive payment. He was forced to liquidate his companies. He then retired to his estate, the Quinta de Villar d'Allen, in Campanhã, near Porto, where he developed spectacular gardens that still exist. He died on 19 May 1848. Two years later, the family decided to sell the museum's contents. Under pressure from the people of Porto, the city council acquired the buildings and content. Now municipal property, the collection reopened to the public on 11 April 1852, under the name Museu Portuense da Rua da Restauração, continuing to be housed in the buildings built by Allen.

The new museum, directed by Edward Allen, John Allen's son, also served as a place for new artists to display their work, such as the painter Francisco José Resende, who exhibited there for the first time in September 1852. In addition, it received various new pieces, including the stone on which the coat of arms of Ferdinand I of Portugal was carved, moved from the Porto Customs House to the Allen Museum on 29 February 1872. This was accompanied by the lintel containing the coat of arms of Manuel I of Portugal, which was at the door of the bastion attached to that Customs House.

After the death of Edward Allen in 1899, the collection started to be known as the Porto Municipal Museum. That institution was transferred in 1905 to the building of the Municipal Public Library of Porto, in the former Convent of Santo António da Cidade, reopening to the public in 1912. The books from Allen's collection ended up in the municipal library. Allen's residence and the museum were later demolished. In 1937, the collection of the Porto Municipal Museum was transferred for reasons of space to the Carrancas Palace. In 1940, it was incorporated into the collection of the Soares dos Reis National Museum in the same building, and the Porto Municipal Museum was closed down. Many of the works collected by Allen are still displayed by the Soares dos Reis museum, on a rotating basis.
