= Normaltown =

Coordinates: 33.964°N 83.402°W

Normaltown is a neighborhood in Athens, Georgia, by the Athens Regional Medical Center and named for the State Normal School formerly located there. It was the first area of Athens to be wired for electricity after the completion of the Mitchell Bridge hydroelectric plant in 1896.

== Music ==
The Normaltown Flyers formed in the neighborhood in 1979. In the 1980s, Allen's in Normaltown was an early venue for bands such as R.E.M. and The B-52's; both it and the neighborhood are mentioned in the lyrics of the 1990 top forty hit "Deadbeat Club".
