= Alain =

Alain may refer to:

== People ==
- Alain (given name), common given name, including list of persons and fictional characters with the name
- Alain (surname)
- "Alain", a pseudonym for cartoonist Daniel Brustlein
- Alain, a standard author abbreviation used to indicate Henri Alain Liogier, also known as Brother Alain, as the author when citing a botanical name
- Alain (philosopher), the pseudonym used by Emile Chartier (1868–1951), French philosopher, journalist, essayist, pacifist, and teacher of philosophy
- Alain LeRoy Locke, African American writer, philosopher, and educator

== Places ==
- Alain, Iran, a village in Tehran Province, Iran
- Al Ain, a city in Abu Dhabi, United Arab Emirates
  - Al Ain International Airport in the United Arab Emirates
- Val-Alain, Quebec, village of 950 people in Quebec, Canada

== Other uses ==
- 1969 Alain (1935 CG), a Main-belt Asteroid discovered in 1935
- Alain (crab), a genus of crabs in the family Pinnotheridae
- Prix Alain-Grandbois or Alain Grandbois Prize is awarded each year to an author for a book of poetry
- Rosa 'Alain', popular red floribunda rose variety

== See also ==
- Allain (disambiguation)
- Al Ain (disambiguation)
