= Dwight Marcy =

American politician

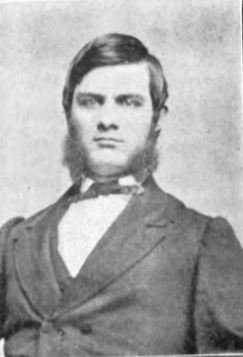
- Born: June 8, 1840; Union, Connecticut, U.S.
- Died: May 7, 1887 (aged 46)
- Occupations: Lawyer, politician

Dwight Marcy (June 8, 1840 – May 7, 1887) was an American lawyer and politician, based in Connecticut.

== Early life and education ==
Marcy, son of Calvin and Elvira (Clark) Marcy, was born June 8, 1840, in Union, Tolland County, Connecticut. After graduation from Yale College in 1863, he studied law in Hartford, in the office of Waldo & Hyde, and was admitted to the bar in 1865.

== Career ==
Marcy began a law practice in Plainfield, but on his appointment as State's Attorney for Tolland County, in June, 1867, he removed his office to Rockville, in the township of Vernon, where he continued until his death. In May, 1867, he was chosen Assistant Clerk of the Connecticut House of Representatives and served as Clerk of the same body the following year, and as Clerk of the Connecticut Senate in 1869. In 1878, 1879, and 1880, he was elected to represent the town of Vernon in the House. He was an influential member of the Assembly in the first and second years of his service, and was elected as Speaker at the remaining session. At the time of his death he was the recognized leader of the bar in Tolland County.

== Personal life ==
He married Alline S. Williams of Groton, Massachusetts, on June 1, 1867. Their daughter Alline E. Marcy also became a lawyer. After suffering from Bright's disease for a long time, he died suddenly at his home, May 7, 1887, at the age of 47.
