= Allen's department store =

Photo of Allen’s department store

Allen's or Allen's department store, a.k.a. George Allen, Inc., was a large store in Center City, Philadelphia for women's clothing and accessories. It opened at 326 High Street in 1837 and moved to 1214 Chestnut Street in 1896. In 1927 it opened a full three-story, 38,250-square-foot (3,554 m^{2}) department store at Chelten Avenue and Greene Street in Germantown, an early suburban area within the city limits. The area around Germantown and Chelten avenues became a busy suburban shopping district attracting shoppers from the northwestern part of the city and from Montgomery County. This was one of the first suburban branches of a downtown department store in the United States, though it was not as early as B. Nugent & Brother of St. Louis which had done so in 1913. The Center City store closed in 1959 and the Germantown store closed in 1979.
