= Allen's (restaurant) =

Coordinates: 33°57′43.82″N 83°24′48.98″W

- Interactive map of Allen's

Restaurant information
- Established: 1955
- Closed: 2011
- Location: Georgia, United States

Allen's was a hamburger joint and nightclub in Athens, Georgia. It was originally established in 1955 in the Normaltown neighborhood of Athens, but was later located at the corner of Hawthorne and Oglethorpe Avenues. It went out of business in November 2011.

== History ==
Allen's was opened by Allen Saine. Saine later sold the business to Athens businessman Billy Slaughter. Slaughter hired Danny Self to run the business and eventually sold it to Self while keeping the real estate.

Allen's got its "World Famous" nickname because of its proximity to the Navy Supply School. The student officers frequented Allen's. They wore Allen's T-shirts in ports all over the world.

In 2002, Self died and Slaughter ended up with the business, eventually closing it in 2004 and later demolishing the building. In 2007, two University of Georgia alumni, Mark Hammond and Hilt Moree, III, acquired the rights to Allen's from Slaughter and re-opened it in a new location with much of the original memorabilia, recipes, and live music. It was located on Hawthorne Avenue, across the street from the Athens YMCA location but still on the edge of Normaltown. There were various pieces of local memorabilia framed on the walls. Allen's closed permanently on November 29, 2011.

== Notable patrons and employees ==
Zell Miller worked there while attending the University of Georgia before going on to become a Governor and later a U.S. Senator.

Notable patrons of Allen's include the late writer Lewis Grizzard, professional wrestler Bill Goldberg, lead guitarist/singer John Bell of Athens band Widespread Panic, R.E.M. lead singer Michael Stipe, and The B-52's who namechecked Allen's in their 1989 single "Deadbeat Club": "Going down to Allen's for a 25 cent beer."

== External material ==
- J.E. GESHWILER, November 13, 2002, PUBLICATION: Atlanta Journal-Constitution, The (GA), EDITION: Home; The Atlanta Journal-Constitution, SECTION: Metro News, PAGE: B7
- KAY POWELL, June 21, 2002, PUBLICATION: Atlanta Journal-Constitution, The (GA), EDITION: Home; The Atlanta Journal-Constitution, SECTION: Metro News, PAGE: C8
- SAEED AHMED, DATE: January 1, 2004, PUBLICATION: Atlanta Journal-Constitution, The (GA), EDITION: Home; The Atlanta Journal-Constitution, SECTION: Metro News, PAGE: D1
- PLOTT BRICE, DATE: November 28, 2003, PUBLICATION: Atlanta Journal-Constitution, The (GA), EDITION: Home; The Atlanta Journal-Constitution, SECTION: Metro News, PAGE: D1
- Plott Brice, DATE: April 8, 2001, PUBLICATION: The Atlanta Journal and The Atlanta Constitution, EDITION: Home; The Atlanta Journal-Constitution, SECTION: Metro News, PAGE: D4
- Rebecca McCarthy and Cat Mantione-Holmes FOR THE JOURNAL-CONSTITUTION, DATE: December 19, 1997, PUBLICATION: The Atlanta Journal and The Atlanta Constitution, EDITION: The Atlanta Constitution The Atlanta Journal, SECTION: SPORTS, PAGE: E7
- FOSKETT, KEN, DATE: April 30, 1994, PUBLICATION: The Atlanta Journal and The Atlanta Constitution, EDITION: The Atlanta Journal-Constitution, SECTION: STATE NEWS, PAGE: C/16
- Nelson, Don, November 19, 2003, Athens Banner-Herald
- Moore, Jennifer, 2004, Athens Banner-Herald
- Quigley, Rebecca, May 14, 2007, Athens Banner-Herald
- Reese, Krista, July 2008, Georgia Trend Magazine
