= Allen County =

Allen County is the name of several counties in the United States:

- Allen County, Indiana
- Allen County, Kansas
- Allen County, Kentucky
- Allen County, Ohio

== See also ==
- Allen Parish, Louisiana
