= Alain (surname) =

Alain is a surname, and may refer to:

- Jehan Alain (1911–1940), French organist and composer
- Marie-Claire Alain (1926–2013), French organist and organ teacher
- Olivier Alain (1918–1994), French organist, pianist, musicologist and composer
