= Louis B. Allyn =

American chemistry professor

Lewis Benajah Allyn
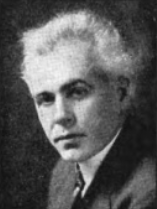
- Born: July 3, 1874; Huntington, Massachusetts
- Died: May 7, 1940 (aged 65); Westfield, Massachusetts
- Other names: Louis
- Occupation: Chemist

Lewis B. Allyn (Louis) (July 3, 1874 – May 7, 1940, in Westfield, Massachusetts) was an American chemistry professor and influential figure in the pure food movement at the time of his murder.

He was teaching at Westfield Teachers College and contributing as a pure foods expert for McClure's magazines at the time of his shooting. His is the only unsolved murder in the history of Westfield, Massachusetts.

== Murder and investigation ==
According to Thomas F. Moriarty, the District Attorney at the time, a witness reported that she was parked 300 feet away when he was murdered. He said she recalled that "a man, wearing dark glasses with his coat collar pulled up was seated behind the wheel of the car," and that a black sedan was involved.

Authorities believed at the time that Professor Allyn was murdered because he refused to hand over a very important secret vitamin formula that was "a vitally important military factor." They added that the nation who was requesting it was "a European nation at war."

At the moment of the murder, the only European nations at war with one another were Germany, France and the United Kingdom, though Germany had already occupied several other European nations. It was only three days after Professor Allyn's murder that Hitler began an invasion of the Netherlands, Belgium, and Luxembourg, ending the phoney war.

A friend of Professor Allyn's verified that an effort by the unnamed nation was made to convince the professor to take an all-expense paid trip there to discuss obtaining the formula, but the professor steadfastly refused on the very day he was slain.

The nation at the time was left unnamed.

== See also ==
- List of unsolved murders (1900–1979)
