= Allen (1913 Philadelphia automobile) =

Defunct American motor vehicle manufacturer

The Allen was a short-lived American automobile manufactured in Philadelphia, Pennsylvania, from 1913 to 1914.

The early models featured a two-cylinder engine, while later ones had a water-cooled four-cylinder version. These models also had a friction transmission and shaft drive, a 9 ft (2.7 m) wheelbase, and a 3 ft 8 in (1.12 m) track, costing $450.
