= Allen (1913 Ohio automobile) =

Defunct American motor vehicle manufacturer

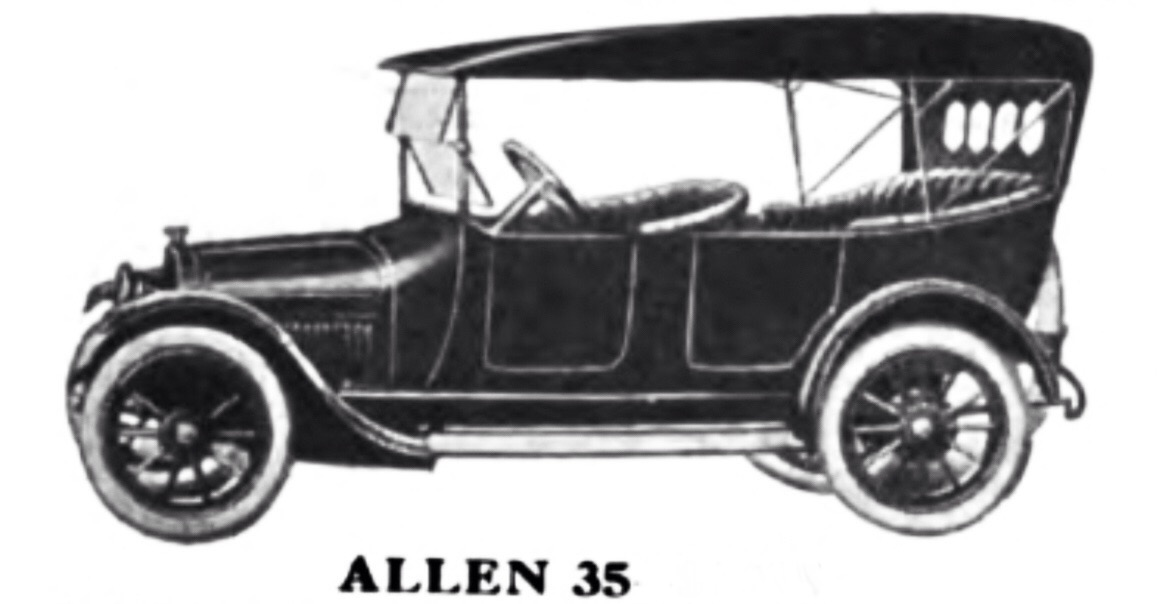
Allen Model 35 (1915)

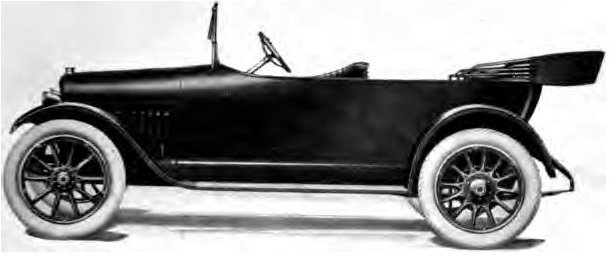
1916 Allen Touring Car

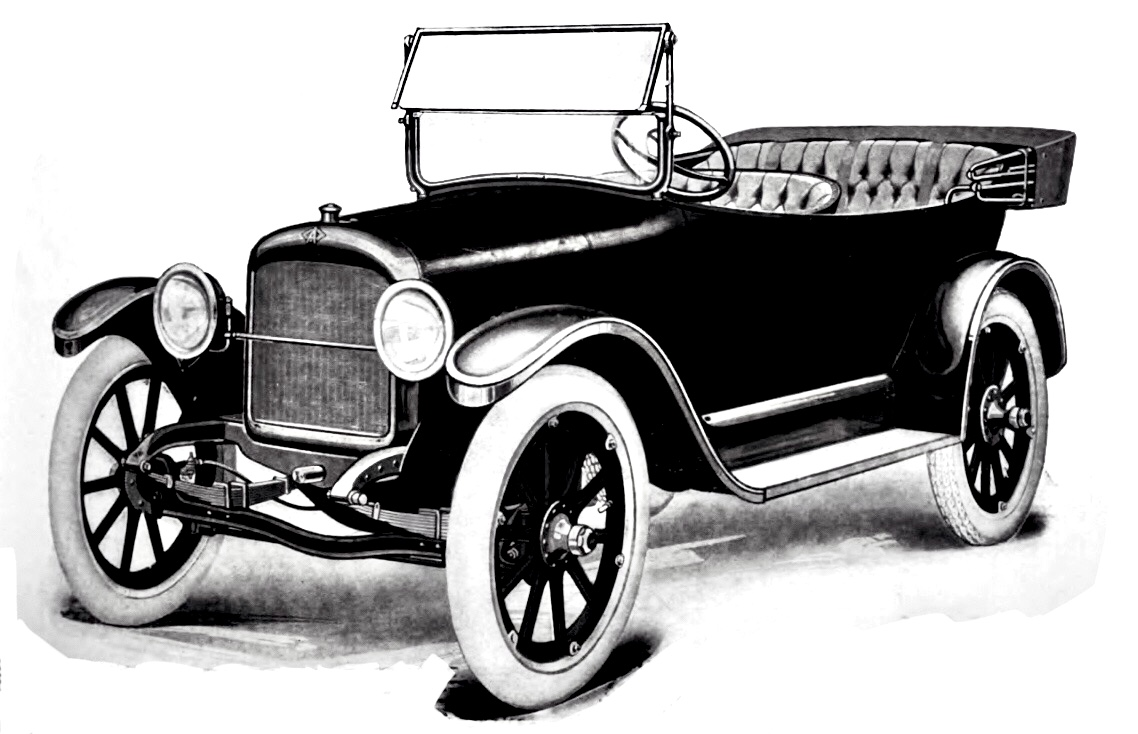
Allen Model 37 (1916)

The Allen was an American automobile built in Fostoria, Ohio between 1913 and 1921. The company used 3.1 liter four-cylinder side-valve Sommers engines, and acquired said company in 1915. The 1920 the Allen 43 was made, featuring bevel-sided touring coachwork and a high-shouldered radiator. Ultimately, sales of this vehicle were not enough to avert the company's bankruptcy, which followed in 1921. Willys acquired what little was left. In total, 20,000 vehicles were sold.

== Overview of production figures ==
Year	Production according to Seltzer, Lawrence H.	Production	Model	Serial numbers	Engine displacement	HP
1913		137	36			
1914	750	753	40	2000 to 2753	5309 cc	27,2
1915	2.250	(753)	40	2000 to 2753	5309 cc	27,2
	↑	1734	33	3501 to 5235	4344 cc	19,2
	↑	(1734)	34	3501 to 5235	4344 cc	21,4
	↑	(1734)	35	3501 to 5235	4826 cc	22,5
	↑	(1734)	38	3501 to 5235	5309 cc	27,6
1916	5.500	5.521	32	6000 to 11521	4826 cc	22,5
	↑	(5.521)	37	6000 to 11521	4826 cc	22,5
1917	4.370	4.458	Classic	11522 to 15980	4826 cc	22,5
1918	3.600	3.507	New 41	18001 to 21508	4826 cc	22,5
1919	3.900	(3.507)	New 41	18001 to 21508	4826 cc	22,5
1920	2.500	4.742	M-43	50000 to 54742	4505 cc	19,6
1921	600	1.316	M-43	54743 to 56445	4505 cc	19,6
1922	50	386	M-43	54743 to 56445	4505 cc	19,6
Sum	23.520	22.554				
