= Carrancas Palace =

- Palácio dos Carrancas
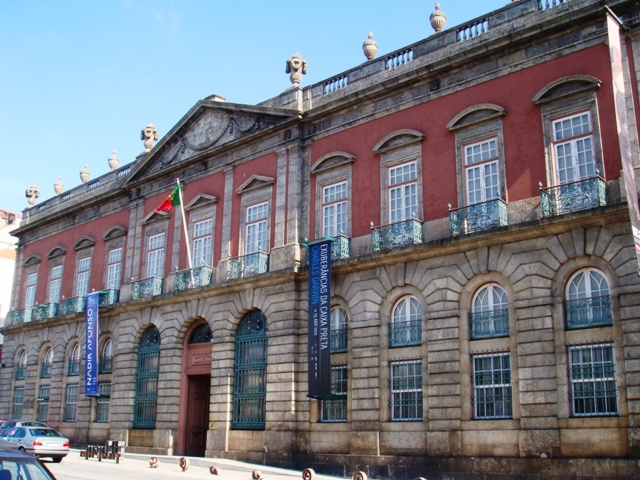
- A view of the former-Palace of the Carrancas, home to the Soares dos Santos National Museum
- Interactive map of the Carrancas Palace area

General information
- Type: Palace
- Location: Cedofeita, Santo Ildefonso, Sé, Miragaia, São Nicolau e Vitória, Portugal
- Coordinates: 41°8′51.85″N 8°37′17.56″W
- Opened: 18th century
- Owner: Portugal

Technical details
- Material: Granite

Design and construction
- Architect: Joaquim da Costa Lima Sampaio

The Palace of the Carrancas (Portuguese: Palácio das Carrancas/Museu Nacional Soares dos Reis) is a former-residence in the civil parish of Cedofeita, Santo Ildefonso, Sé, Miragaia, São Nicolau e Vitória, in the northern Portuguese city of Porto. It houses the Soares dos Reis National Museum.

== History ==
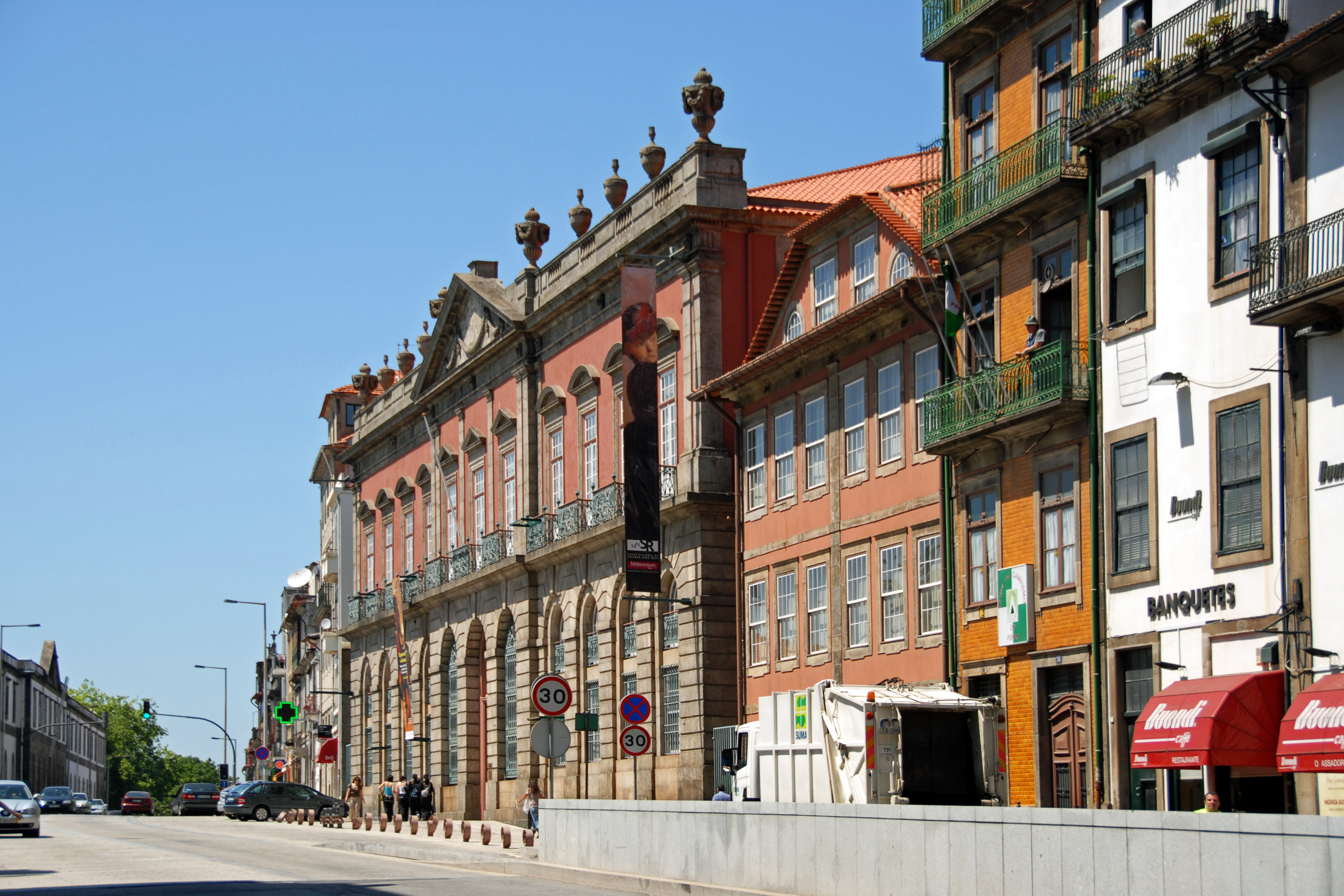
A view of the Palace of the Carrancas along the Rua de D. Manuel II

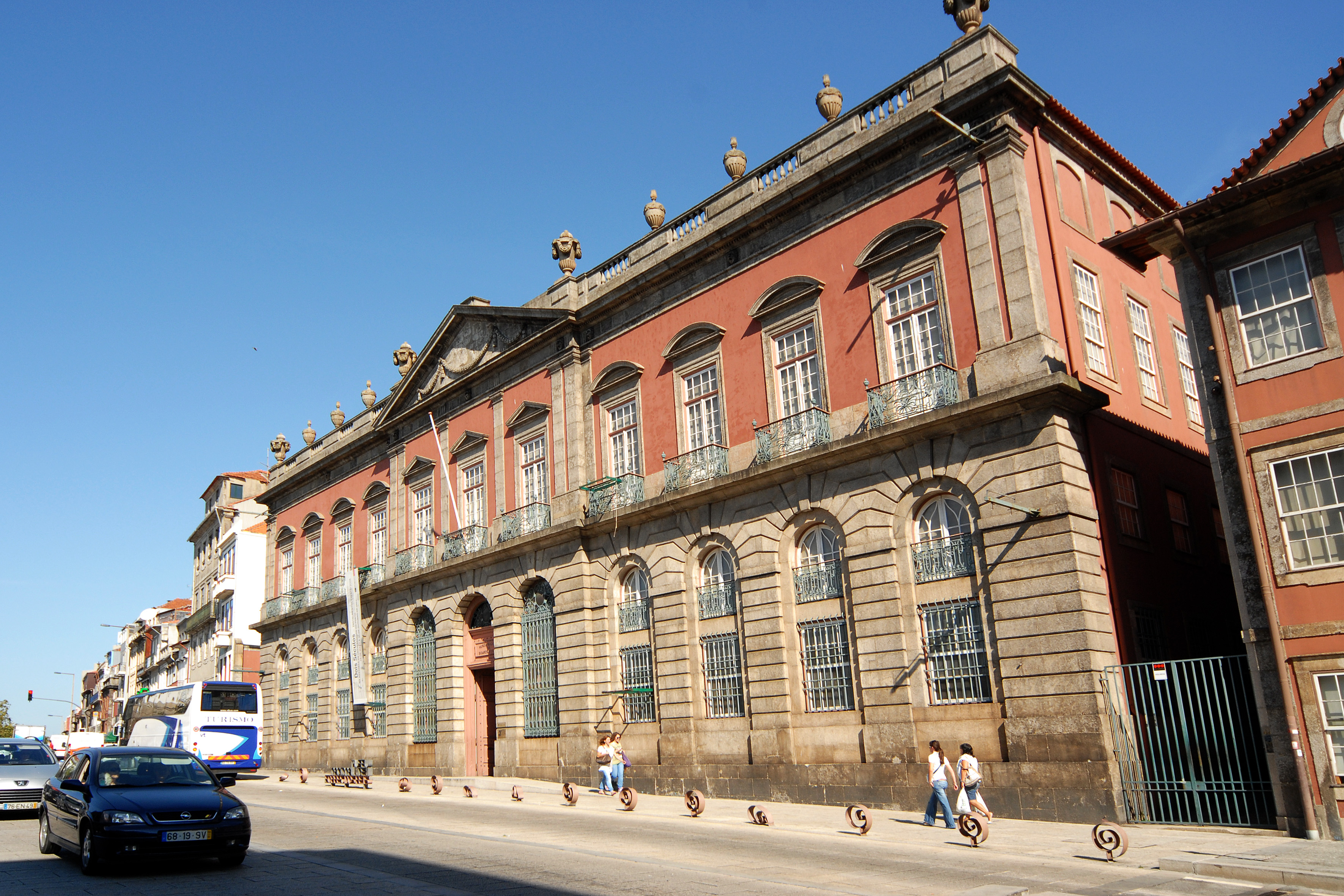
An oblique view of the Palace used by the Museum of Soares dos Reis

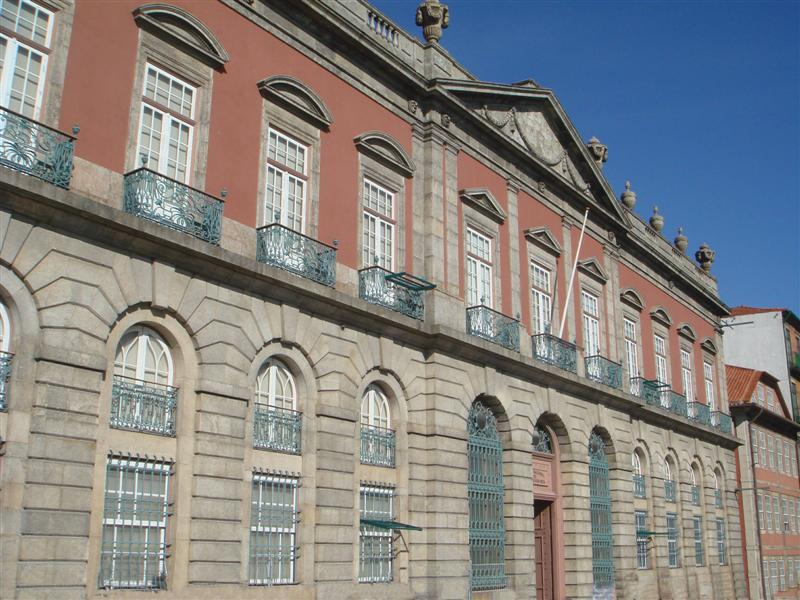
Another view of the main frontispiece and detail that marked the ground floor former-entranceway, carriage house and stables

In the 18th century, D. Brites Maria Felizarda de Castro acquired a series of lots in order to build a great house for a residence and to be able to establish a factory in 1795. The project was attributed to Joaquim da Costa Lima Sampaio, an architect who had previously worked on the building of the Hospital of Santo António and the Feitoria Inglesa (British Factory House), Neo-Palladian buildings designed by English architects based in Porto. This influence explains the style of the Palace, which follows the Neoclassical style that characterised late 18th and 19th-century architecture in Porto. The interior of the palace was decorated with stucco work attributed to the Italian Luis Chiari as well as wall paintings.

Between 1800 and 1801, the family Moraes e Castro (or Morais e Castro in its modern version) moved to the location, bringing to the location not only their coat-of-arms, but also a nickname to the site associated with them: the Carrancas, which means scowls/frowns.

During the course of the Peninsular Wars, in 1808, the building became the official residence of the Corregedor-mor Tamboreau and General Marquez de Valladares, and in the following year (1809) the residences of General Soult and, later, headquarters of General Wellesley.

Similarly, it was the residence of General Beresford following the Peninsular Warm, and during the Siege of Porto (1832), King Peter IV used the palace as his headquarters for four months. In 1861, though, there was a promissory note to sell the palace by D. Pedro V.

A velodrome was located in the lands of the palace in 1894.

By 1903, there was work completed on the front of the building.

In the 1915 testament, King D. Manuel II determined that the Palace be given to the Santa Casa da Misericórdia, which was only recognized in 1932.

In 1937, work was performed in the building in order to adapt it into a museum.

Beginning in 1940 the structure received various upgrades and renovations, as it was adapted to take on the role as museum. This also includes repairs and installation of electrical services (such as those carried out in 1967). A general expansion and restoration of the building began in 1969, that included repair to the electrical system and water-heating equipment. In 1971, restructure and remodeling of the interior was accomplished, but continued in for another year. Ironically, further work on the electrical system was effected beginning in 1974, but extended to the restoration worked carried out in 1976, that included various parts of the museum. Following the Carnation Revolution, the Soares dos Reis Museum continued to benefit assistance from the state, resulting in work to conserve the interior paint, the installation of a fire system and a remodelling of the central heating system, which was eventually replaced in 1984, which continued to 1987.

On 9 August 1991, the museum that was established was integrated into the administration of the Instituto Português de Museus (Portuguese Institute of Museums), under decree 278/91 (Diário da República, Série-1A). By the end of the 20th century, there was further work completed in the interior on the staircases, vertical accesses and washrooms, along with remodelling of the galleries on the first floor occupied by the secretariat and administration of the museum, as well as the warehouse in 1993. This culminating in the third-phase expansion of the spaces between 1994 and 1999.

In 2001, the president of the municipal council reformulated the tunnel project of Ceuta (initiated in 1996), to include two exits at Carregal and the other along Rua D. Manuel II (alongside the accessway to the palace). But, by 14 January the IPPAR denied the extension of the tunnel and the project along Rua D. Manuel II was concluded. On 29 July, the Tunnel of Ceuta, was inaugurated with its only exit at the Garden of Carregal, and the exit way along Rua D. Manuel II was closed.

On 29 March 2007, the property became administrated by the Instituto dos Museus e Conservação (Institute for Museums and Conservation), under decree 97/2007 (Diário da República, Série 1, 63).

== Architecture ==
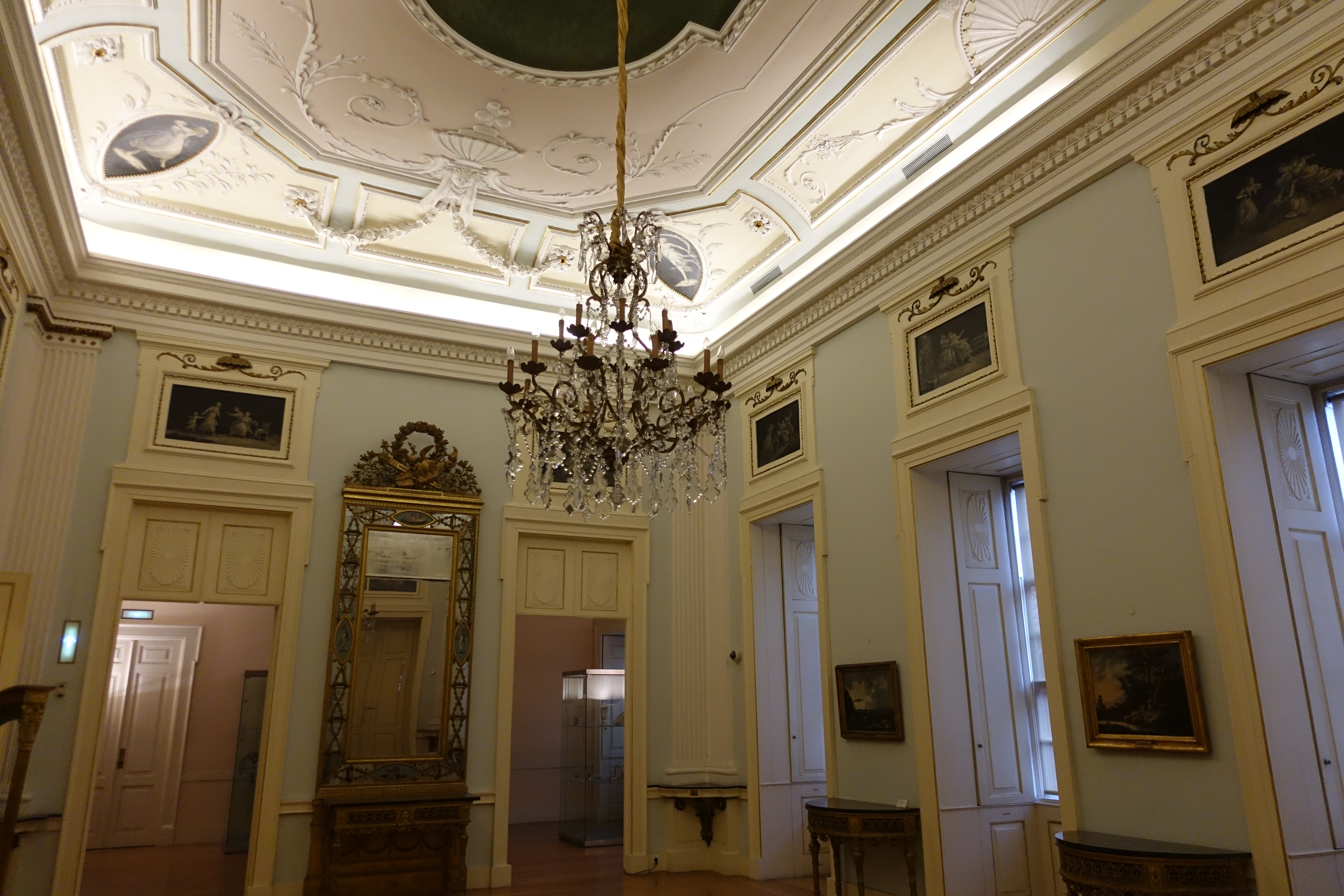
An elaborate room decorated with chandelier and ceiling work, including garlands and vegetal forms

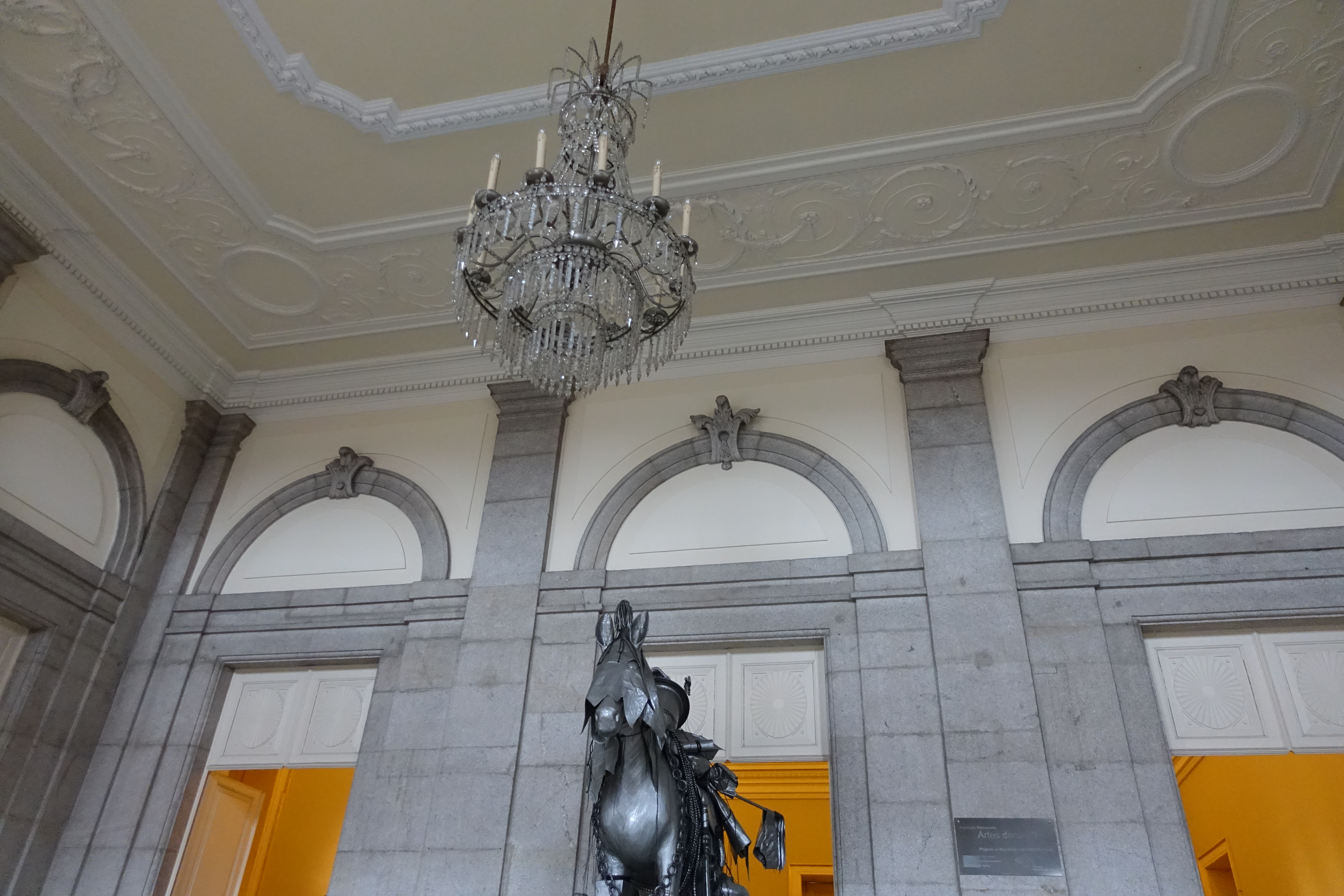
Atrium of simple arched doorways that mark the main atrium

The palace is located in an urban context, with the Hospital de Santo António to the rear. The immense stature of the building is diluted by its position within a series of lots, aligned to the profile of the road. Access to the annexes are made from the lateral iron gates that connect to the rear of the building (the old accessways to the old factory, but today providing access to the museum galleries).

The group of volumes include four areas: the palace, with three floors designed in a "U" shape; the galleries which extend from the main building and third rear gallery; the central patio between them; and an ample open space in the rear. The main building includes a grandioso facade, with the main state room elevated, its central corpo protruding and supported by three arches, crowned by frontispiece. The rhythm of the openings of the first floor alternate between curved and triangular pediments, with medallions underpinned by garlands, while the entire structure is surmounted by balustrade decorated with vases and urns.

Over the years the spaces have suffered many alterations, due to the mobility of families and frequent use by visitors. Nonetheless, there are obvious uses that can be identifiable. On the first floor, along with the great atrium of the entranceway, are accessways leading into the various warehouses, former-stables and carriage houses of the old building. The second floor was used by the family, while the state rooms reserved for important peoples. The final floor was used for servants quarters and the offices of the seigneurial factory. The kitchens occupied two wings that encircled the interior garden.
