= Allyn Range =

Mountain range in Australia

Coordinates: 32°7.48′S 151°25.74′E

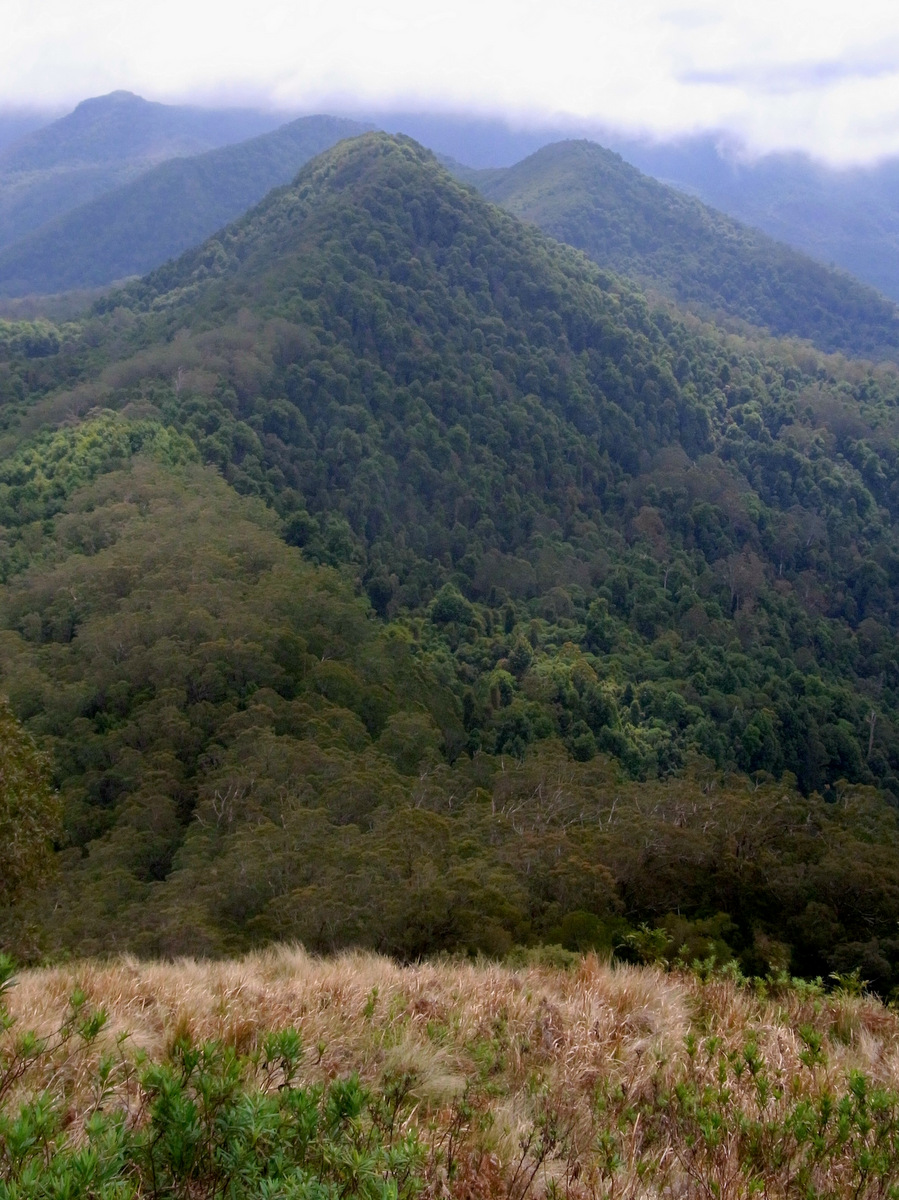
- Mount Lumeah, Barrington Tops

Highest point
- Peak: near Eremeren Point
- Elevation: 1,537 m (5,043 ft)

Geography
- Country: Australia
- State: New South Wales
- Region: Hunter Region
- Parent range: Mount Royal Range - Great Dividing Range

The Allyn Range is a mountain range in New South Wales, Australia. It is part of the Barrington Tops region and joins the Mount Royal Range on the Barrington Tops plateau to the north. High points on the range include Eremeren Point, Ben Bullen, Mount Gunama, Mount Lumeah and Mount Allyn.

The range is heavily forested and much of it is a wilderness area covered in Antarctic beech cool temperate rainforest. Just below the range is Burraga Swamp. Apart from a dirt road drive to Mount Allyn, access is limited and difficult. It is suggested the range is hazardous to light aircraft, as cloud and fog are often present.

== See also ==
- List of mountains in Australia § New South Wales
