= Allen Power Plant =

Allen Power Plant can refer to:

- Allen Combined Cycle Plant, a natural gas power plant in Memphis, Tennessee
- Allens Creek Nuclear Power Plant, a canceled nuclear power plant in Wallis, Texas
- Allen Fossil Plant, a former coal-fired power plant in Memphis, Tennessee
- G. G. Allen Steam Station, a coal-fired power plant in Gaston County, North Carolina
