= River Allen =

River Allen may refer to:

== Watercourses ==
- River Allen, Dorset, England
- River Allen, Northumberland, England
- River Allen, Cornwall, England, a tributary of the River Camel
- River Allen (Truro), England, a tributary of the Truro River

== People ==
- River Allen (footballer) (born 1995), English footballer

== See also ==
- Allen River, New Zealand
