= Alline E. Marcy =

American lawyer (1868–1912)

- Born: February 15, 1868; Rockville, Connecticut, U.S.
- Died: May 29, 1912 (aged 44); New York, New York, U.S.
- Occupation: Lawyer
- Father: Dwight Marcy

Alline E. Marcy (February 15, 1868 – May 29, 1912) was an American lawyer who practiced in Boston.

== Biography ==
Marcy was born in Rockville, Connecticut, the daughter of Dwight Marcy and Sarah Alline Williams Marcy. Her father was a lawyer and a politician in Connecticut. She studied law with her father and with B. H. Hill. She graduated from Rockville High School in 1886, and from Boston University School of Law in 1892.

Marcy worked for a title insurance company and had her own law practice. Her specialization was conveyancing, as examiner of titles for the Metropolitan Water Board of Boston, and in the Realty Department of the Massachusetts State House. She was vice president of the Massachusetts Association of Women Lawyers, and a member of the Professional Women's Club. Marcy died in a New York City hospital in May 1912, at the age of 44, from complications after a surgery.
