= Allens Bay =

Bay in Minnesota, U.S.

Coordinates: 47°25′54.98″N 94°37′36.32″W

Allens Bay is a bay in Beltrami County, Minnesota, in the United States.

Allens Bay was named for James Allen, who explored the area.
