= Mount Allyn =

Mountain in Australia

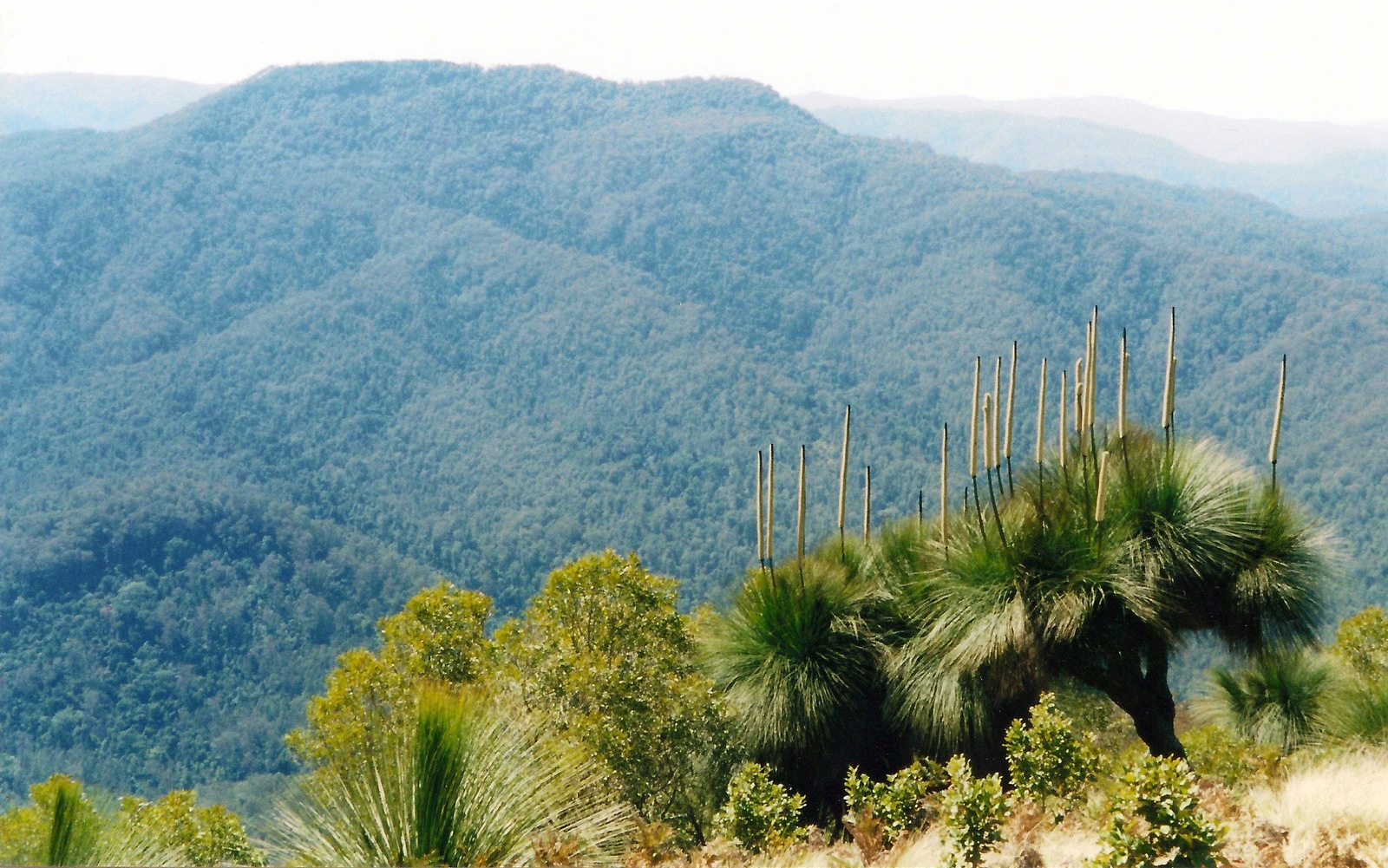
- Mount Allyn & Grass Trees, photographed from Mount Cabrebald

Highest point
- Elevation: 1,125 m (3,691 ft)
- Listing: List of mountains in Australia
- Coordinates: 32°7.48′S 151°25.74′E

Geography
- Location within New South Wales
- Location: Chichester State Forest, Upper Hunter region, New South Wales, Australia
- Country: Australia
- Parent range: Allyn Range

Geology
- Rock age: Eocene

Mount Allyn is a mountain with an elevation of 1,125 metres (3,691 ft) AHD that is part of the Allyn Range, located within the Chichester State Forest, in the Upper Hunter region of New South Wales, Australia. Mount Allyn is located about 8 kilometres (5.0 mi) south southwest of Careys Peak and about 50 kilometres (31 mi) northeast of Muswellbrook.

Snow often falls in winter. Much of the mountain is covered in Antarctic beech cool temperate rainforest.

There is dirt-road access to the peak.

== See also ==
- List of mountains in Australia § New South Wales
