= Allen Mountain =

Allen Mountain may refer to:

- Allen Mountain (Montana), located in Glacier National Park (U.S.)
- Allen Mountain (New York), located in the Adirondack Mountains
