= Ahlawat =

Surname list

Ahlawat is an Indian Jat surname. They are mostly found in the northern India.

Notable people bearing the surname include:

- Jaideep Ahlawat (born 1980), Indian actor
- Mohit Ahlawat (actor) (born 1962), Indian actor
- Mohit Ahlawat (cricketer) (born 1995), Indian sportsman
- Mukesh Kumar Ahlawat, Indian politician
- Narender Singh Ahlawat (born 1951), Indian Army officer
