= Alan, Russia =

Alan (Russian: Алан) is the name of several rural localities in Russia:

- Alan, Republic of Buryatia, an ulus in the Khorinsky District of the Republic of Buryatia
- Alan, Arsky District, Republic of Tatarstan, a village in Arsky District of the Republic of Tatarstan
- Alan, Baltasinsky District, Republic of Tatarstan, a village in Baltasinsky District of the Republic of Tatarstan
- Alan, Mamadyshsky District, Republic of Tatarstan, a village in Mamadyshsky District of the Republic of Tatarstan
- Alan, Tyulyachinsky District, Republic of Tatarstan, a selo in Tyulyachinsky District of the Republic of Tatarstan
