= Allain =

Allain is both a surname and a given name. Notable people with the name include:

== Surname ==
- Alexander Allain (1920–1994), American lawyer and library advocate
- Bret Allain, American politician
- Keith Allain (born 1958), American ice hockey player and coach
- Marcel Allain (1885–1969), French writer
- Oscar Allain (1922–2025), Peruvian painter
- Pierre Allain (1904–2000), French mountain climber
- Raymonde Allain (1912–2008), French model and actress
- Rhett Allain, American physicist
- Rick Allain (born 1969), Canadian ice hockey player and coach
- Stephanie Allain (born 1959), American film producer
- Tara Allain (born 1985), American beauty pageant winner
- Theophile T. Allain (1846–1917), American politician
- Valérie Allain (born 1966), French actress
- William Allain (1928–2013), American politician

== Given name ==
- Allain Gaussin (born 1943), French composer
- Allain Provost, French landscape architect
- Allain Roy (born 1970), Canadian ice hockey player
- Allain Tikko (1979–2009), Estonian military officer

== See also ==
- Alain (disambiguation)
