= Allen's Coffee Brandy =

Liqueur in New England

Allen's Coffee Brandy is a coffee-flavored liqueur popular in New England, especially Maine. Allen's Coffee Brandy is prepared and bottled by M.S. Walker, Inc. of Norwood, Massachusetts. The beverage is 60 proof, or 30% alcohol by volume.

In the 1990s into the 2000s, the product was the best-selling liquor product in Maine for about 20 years. Sales in 2008 were 1,100,000 bottles. Gary Shaw, vice president of M.S. Walker, has noted that his company ships "a phenomenal amount" of brandy to Maine each month.

== Uses ==
Allen's Coffee Brandy is typically served in a drink consisting of 4 oz brandy and 2 oz milk in a pint glass, sometimes called a "Fat Ass in a Glass". According to Gary Shaw, an executive of the drink's parent company, the brandy's popularity in Maine may originate from fisherman adding it to coffee, "maybe to kind of warm 'em up from the inside as well as the outside". Allen's is also popularly mixed with another Maine staple, Moxie, to produce the "Burnt Trailer", or (with Diet Moxie), the "Welfare Mom".

Consumers of Allen's are known to call the drink by various humorous names, including "Hancock County Panty Remover", "The Champagne of Maine", "Lewiston Martini", and numerous others.

New concoctions and mixers have resulted in new variants and naming conventions. "Maine Breakfast" (alternatively: "Corker") is an Allen's and oat milk.

== Legality ==
Allen's came into some legal question when the United States placed a ban on caffeinated alcoholic beverages. However, with a significantly lower caffeine content, produced by the coffee flavorings and not added intentionally as with (the original) Four Loko and the other alcoholic energy drinks targeted by the ban, Allen's Coffee Brandy is still legal to sell.
