= Allen, West Virginia =

Unincorporated community in West Virginia, United States

- Unincorporated community
- Location within West Virginia Location within the United States
- Coordinates: 38°7′21″N 82°4′31″W
- Country: United States
- State: West Virginia
- County: Lincoln
- Elevation: 886 ft (270 m)
- Time zone: UTC-5 (Eastern (EST))
  - Summer (DST): UTC-4 (EDT)
- GNIS feature ID: 1741586

Allen was an unincorporated community in Lincoln County, West Virginia, United States.
