= Alan (automobile) =

Automobile produced in 1920s Germany

The Alan was a German "inflation-period" automobile of simple design; it was manufactured by J Mayer in Bamberg (Bavaria) in limited numbers between 1923 and 1925. The only model, the 6/30, had a 30 hp, four-cylinder engine with overhead valves, made in Berlin by Siemens & Halske.
