= Nugents =

Former department store in St. Louis

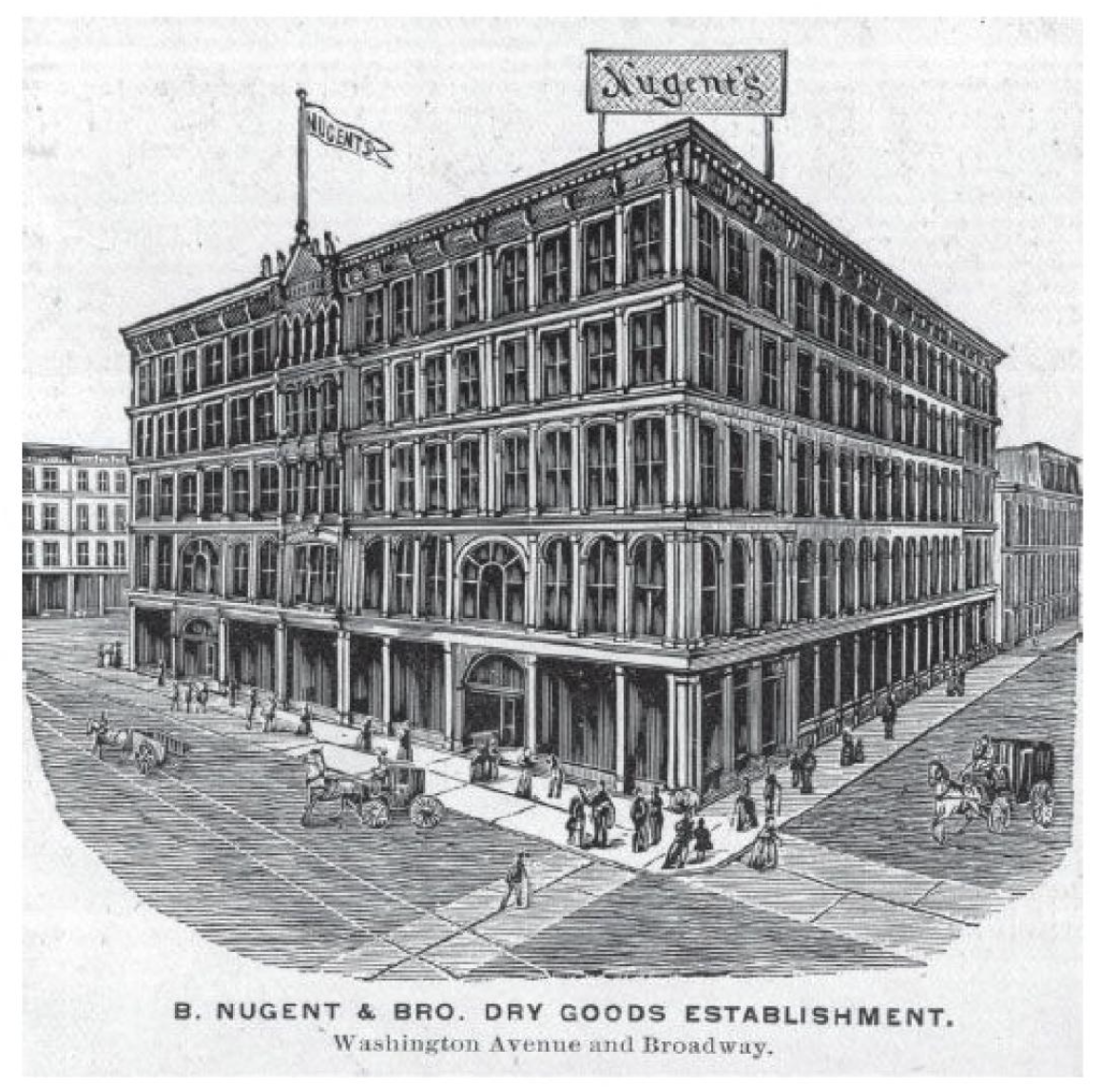
Nugents downtown store

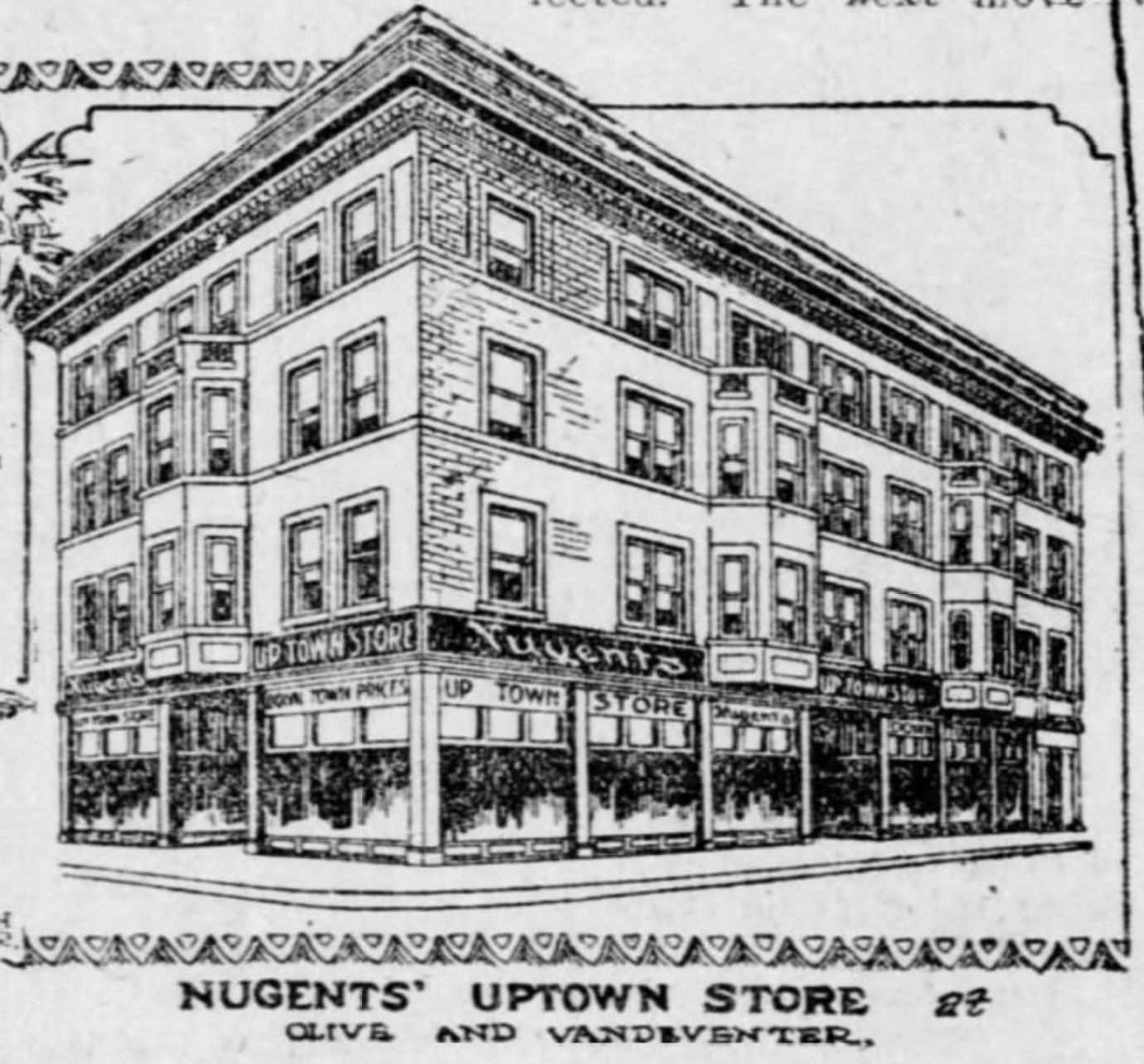
Nugents "Uptown" (now Midtown) Store 1914, the first suburban branch of a U.S. downtown department store

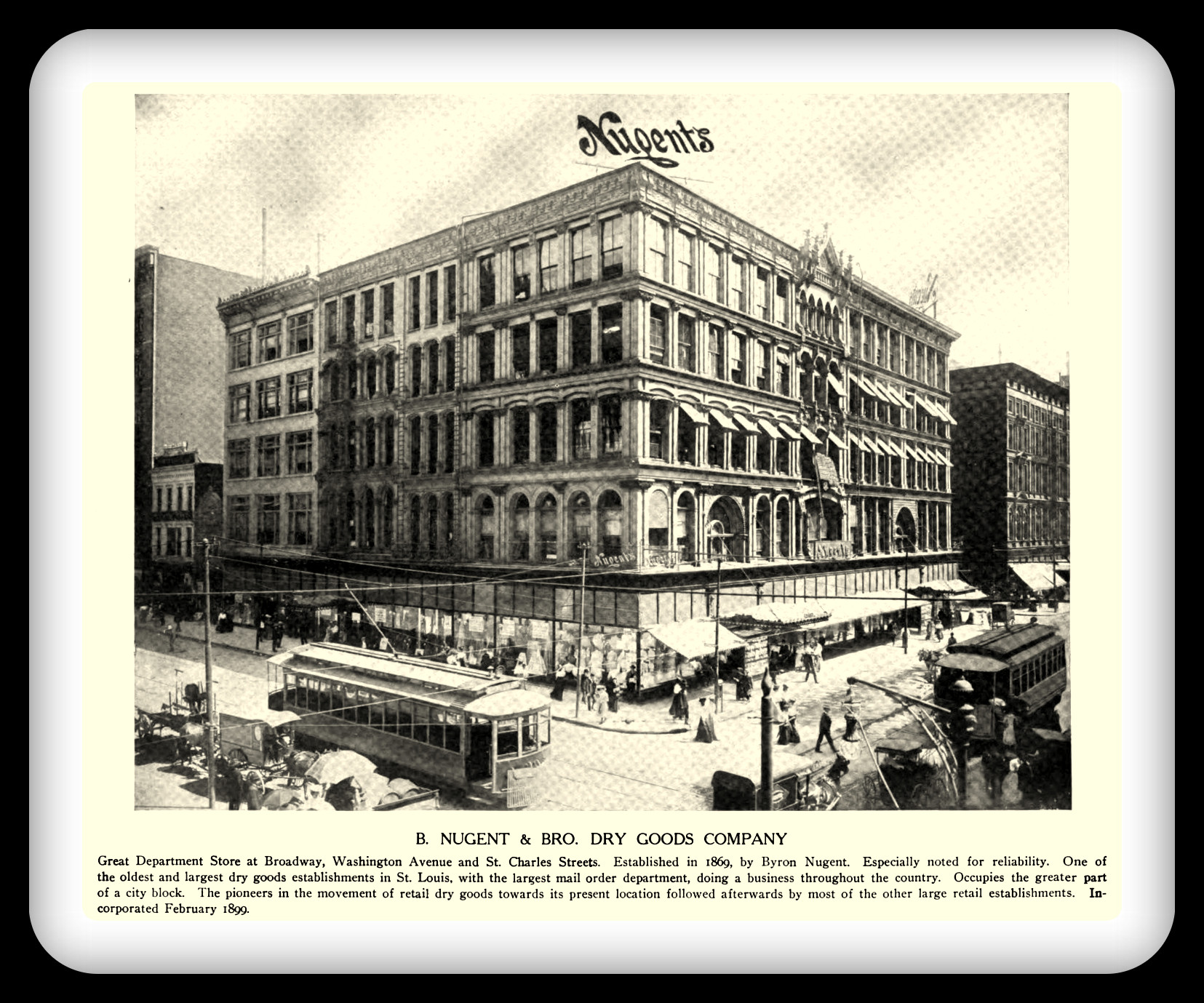
Nugents downtown store

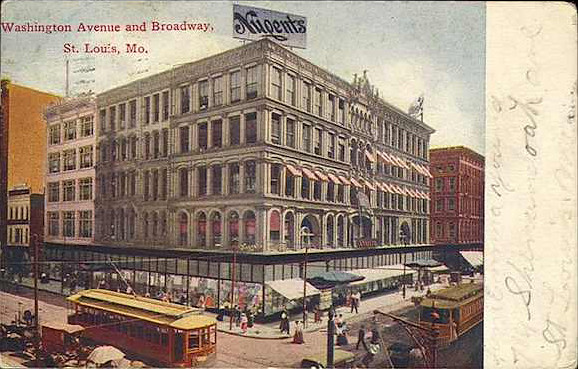
Postcard image of Nugents downtown store

Nugents or B. Nugent & Brother Dry Goods Co. was a department store in Downtown St. Louis, Missouri at the southeast corner of Washington Avenue and Broadway. It was the first downtown department store in the United States to open a suburban branch.

The dry goods store was founded in 1869 by Byron Nugent (d. 1908) in Mount Vernon, Illinois. He moved to St. Louis and started a 23-by-56-foot store there at the southeast corner of Broadway and Franklin in February 1873. In 1878 it moved to larger quarters at 817 N. Broadway, then added 819, for a total of four stories of 50-by-100-feet each (20,000 square feet (1,900 m^{2}) in total). Mottos included "onward and upward", "one price system". In 1882, 815 and 821 N. Broadway were added to the store complex. It also built out the back, for four stories at 90 x 135 feet(48,600 square feet (4,520 m^{2}) in total). In 1889 Nugents moved again to an even larger site, which would remain its home until the company closed, but not before annexing two additional buildings. In 1914, it celebrated "41 years underselling", illustrating the low-price, mass-merchandise theme of Nugents where it positioned itself in the market. The downtown complex eventually came to consist of three buildings and there was a bridge across St. Charles Street to one of them, referred to as an Annex, which dated back to 1850. The bridge and the Annex were both demolished in 1942.

The main part of the Downtown store was reclad and is in use by the St. Louis Federal Reserve Bank.

== Uptown branch ==
Nugents opened a branch store, the first downtown department store in the U.S. to do so, in Midtown St. Louis (then called "Uptown") at Olive and Vandeventer, on April 12, 1913. It had bought an existing store called The Banner Store and converted it. The Uptown branch was 15,000 square feet (1,400 m^{2}) in size over three floors. 14–15 years before any other U.S. downtown department store did so.

A branch was later opened in Wellston, Missouri.

== Epilogue ==
The company was bought by National Department Stores in 1923 and was liquidated in 1933. At their peak the stores had employed around 1500 persons.
