= Navy Supply Corps School =

U.S. Navy training course

Coordinates: 41.5099°N 71.3268°W

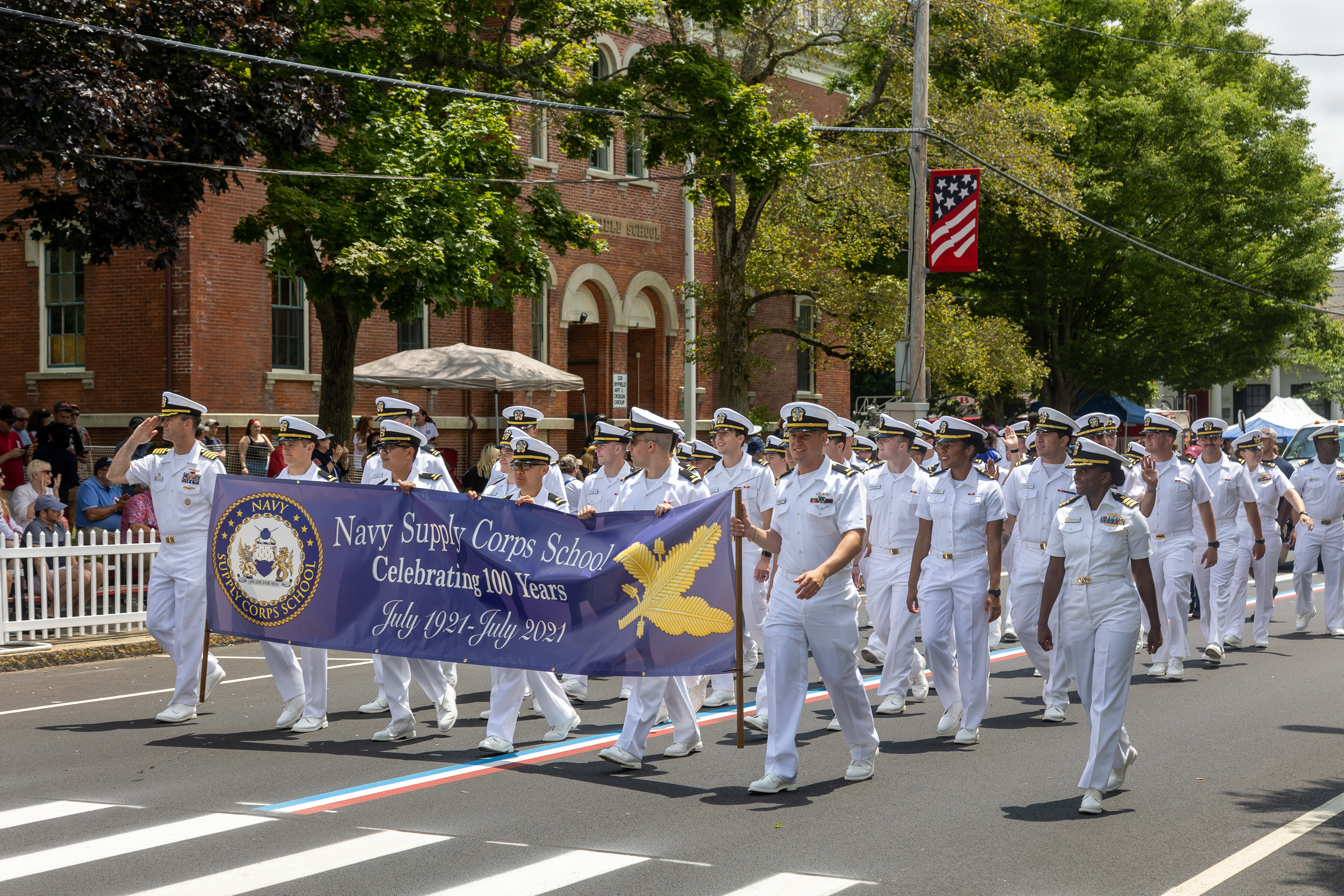
- Navy Supply Corps School at the 2021 Bristol Fourth of July Parade
- Motto in English: Ready for Sea!
- Established: 16 July 1921; 105 years ago
- Commanding Officer: Capt. Dena B. Risley
- Location: Newport, Rhode Island, United States
- Website: www.netc.navy.mil/NSCS/
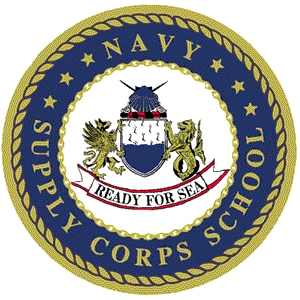

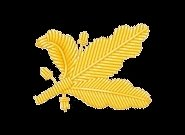
Oak leaf insignia

The Navy Supply Corps School (NSCS), located in Newport, Rhode Island, comprises a 20-week training "Basic Supply Officer Course" (BSOC) (formerly BQC) and other courses for newly commissioned and other Supply Corps officers in the US Navy. Those who successfully complete the courses are designated "Ready for Sea" in the Navy Supply Corps.

The commanding officer currently is Captain Dena B. Risley, and the Executive Officer is Commander Melissa Flynn.

== History ==
The origins of the Navy Supply Corps School dates back to 1905, when the Naval Pay Officers School was first created in the Navy Department in Washington, D.C. This school closed three months after opening. In 1918 the Officers Material School for Supply Corps was formed in Princeton University to manage the influx of new officers being qualified for assignments during World War I. The Officers Material School for Supply Corps closed along with the ending of WWI. In 1921 The Navy Supply Corps School of Application in Washington, D.C. had 25 students deeming its first official class. This school was closed three years later.

A new Navy School was opened by Capt. David Potter in 1934 as the Naval Finance and Supply School in the Philadelphia Naval Shipyard. In 1940 the Supply Corps Naval Reserve Officers School was established in Washington, D.C. Ten months later the two schools merged to form the Navy Supply Corps School (NSCS) at the Harvard University Graduate School of Business in Cambridge, Massachusetts. 1943 marked the first navy school allowing women located in Radcliffe College in Cambridge. This school was known as the Navy Supply Corps School for Women Accepted for Volunteer Emergency Service.

The Naval Supply Operational Training Center was established in 1944 in Bayonne, New Jersey but later became a part of the NSCS and renamed as such. The NSCS school then transferred to Athens, Georgia in 1954 as larger facilities were required. The NSCS operated adjacent to the University of Georgia's University High School. The Athens NSCS closed in 2010 to relocate to Newport, Rhode Island. In January 2011, NSCS opened opposite the Naval War College in Newport, Rhode Island. On June 1, 2026, Capt. Dena B. Risley relieved Capt. T. Richie Jenkins as Commanding Officer of NSCS.

== Navy Supply Corps Introductory Programs ==
=== Basic Supply Officer Course ===
The Basic Supply Officer Course (BSOC) (formerly called the Basic Qualification Course [BQC]) is a 20-week in-person program that teaches management techniques essential for understanding Navy procedures through exams and practical assessments. The BSOC teaches students supply management, food service, retail operations, disbursing management, and leadership management. These supply skills are tested through practical applications and examinations. The aim of the BSOC is to get newly commissioned officers "Ready for Sea" as Supply Officers. All BSOC students must complete a five-day Division Officer Leadership Course. This course teaches junior officers the skills to become an effective leader in an operational environment. This course is taught through scenario-driven activities through the use of interactive videos, role-playing, and group-based discussions. Students will be placed in a work center, build working relationships with the Chain of Command, improve time management, and discuss functional administration all to develop leadership principles.

=== Basic Qualification Course - Navy Reserve ===
This program teaches individuals to become Navy Reserve supply officers. The Basic Qualification Course - Navy Reserve (BQC-NR) program teaches fundamental, technical, and managerial information required to be an effective Supply officer in the Navy Reserve. The total duration of the BQC-NR is 15 months. This time is made up of self-paced correspondence work with three different on-site training intervals. The BQC-NR course curriculum comprises Supply Management, Food Service, Disbursing Management, Retail Operations, and Leadership and Management. A minimum grade of 80 percent is required for each curriculum aspect.

== Post Introductory Officer Courses ==
=== Transportation of Hazardous Materials ===
The Transportation of Hazardous Materials (HAZMAT) course provides formal training prerequisite for command-approved qualification to certify hazardous materials for shipment via all modes of transportation. The course includes a comprehensive overview of the transportation of hazardous materials by motor, rail, and water and an intensive review of the requirements for movement of hazardous materials by commercial/military air. HAZMAT also discusses the role of the Department of Transportation, Defense Transportation System, commercial carriers and different regional laws regarding handling, packaging, marking, labelling and placarding of hazardous materials. Practical learning is heavily used for greater comprehension through the use of mock-up HAZMAT offices and storage rooms. Students will learn about relevant codes regarding transportation, labelling and inspections. HAZMAT has three separate examinations on regulations determining whether students pass the course. Recertification and additional certification is required after every two years after the HAZMAT qualification credit is acquired.

Recertification is acquired through the Transportation of Hazardous Materials Recertification Course. This requires students to certify hazardous materials for transportation. They must have completed the HAZMAT or equivalent course within the last two years. This course discusses the same transportation elements of the HAZMAT course. Fulfilment of the course is determined by one final examination. The aim of this course is to keep transportation managers familiar with new regulations.

=== Joint Aviation Supply and Maintenance Material Management ===
The Joint Aviation Supply and Maintenance Material Management (JASMMM) course seeks to improve aircraft readiness by improving collaboration between aviation maintenance and supply logisticians. Experienced fleet personnel take part in a two-week-long course designed to increase resourcing and procedural awareness across the entire Naval Aviation Enterprise. It teaches students technical and management aviation skills in order to create synergy between maintenance and supply members through communication in order to improve the weapon support system. Areas discussed include Naval Aviation Enterprise initiatives, Aviation Consolidated Allowance List, Inventory management, advanced management/ leadership fundamentals and all levels of Maintenance influencing Flight-Line Operations. The topics are taught through case studies with practical activities to enhance understanding.

=== Reserve Supply Management and Advanced Refresher Training ===
Reserve Supply Management and Advanced Refresher Training (RESMART) is catered to the education on supply management procedures to logistics specialists. This is a fast-paced course that covers the relevant areas regarding logistics specialists. RESMART teaches through lecture and practical format, and requires students to research, create and present demonstrations on supply management. The aim of RESMART is to develop confidence and presentation skills in students so they can train other reserve units in supply information.

=== Introduction to Maritime Logistics Planning (LogPlans) ===
(formerly Introduction to Expeditionary Logistics [IEL]) Introduction to Maritime Logistics Planning provides students with the knowledge and tools to apply the Navy Planning Process from the perspective of a logistician operating at the operational level of war. The course emphasizes how to determine requirements, assess capabilities, and allocate resources to deploy, sustain, and logistically support maritime forces across the range of military operations.

=== Intermediate Supply Officer Course (ISOC) ===
The Intermediate Supply Officer Course (ISOC) (formerly called the Supply Officer Department Head Course [SODHC]) four-week program is for individuals wanting to become Supply Officer Department Heads afloat. ISOC teaches five key areas of supply management: Supply Management, Food Service, Retail Operations, Disbursing Management and Postal Operations. Additionally, ISOC students are taught more specific functions, including Configuration Management, Hazardous Materials Management and Submarine-specific Supply Functions. The aim of ISOC is to make Lieutenants effective and efficient managers that supply officers ought to be.

=== Advanced Supply Officer Course (ASOC) ===
A similar course is provided to senior Supply Corps officers called the Advanced Supply Officer Course (ASOC) (formerly called Senior Supply Officer Department Head Course [SR SODHC]). ASOC teaches all the same supply management topics and other senior role requirements such as ethics, financial management and inventory. This senior role means students must assemble reports such as monthly and annual financial management plans. The 8-day ASOC program is aimed at reprogramming officers to take charge as Supply Officers in the Department Head.

=== Advanced Management Program ===
Advanced Management Program (AMP) teaches upper and middle management leadership skills in order to help managers create and introduce strategies, supervise groups of people, and utilize managerial competence and experience into policy-level perspective. Students will undertake group discussions and presentations to overcome workplace problems. The aim of AMP is to develop managerial abilities and skills such as communication and overcoming workplace problems to become more effective managers.

=== International Logistics Executive Advanced Development ===
International Logistics Executive Advanced Development (ILEAD) is a seven-week course focused on providing relevant logistical and supply chain management information useful from a militaristic perspective. This course is catered to senior international officers. ILEAD includes a two-week AMP course in order to grant full comprehension of the syllabus.

=== International Officer Supply Course ===
This is a course for international partners. It familiarizes students with the organizational structure of the U.S. government, U.S. Navy, Naval Supply Systems Command (NAVSUP), Defense Logistics Agency (DLA), and their relationship to Foreign Military Sales (FMS) processes. It discusses logistics supply chain, defined as identifying, locating, ordering and tracking assets. The course also assists international customers in developing a working knowledge of Department of Defense web-based logistics systems and FMS requisitioning procedures and all aspects of the Security Cooperation Information Portal (SCIP).

== Students and Faculty ==
The NSCS graduated 1,866 individuals in 2024.
