= Allen Township =

Allen Township may refer to:

== Illinois ==
- Allen Township, LaSalle County, Illinois

== Indiana ==
- Allen Township, Miami County, Indiana
- Allen Township, Noble County, Indiana

== Iowa ==
- Allen Township, Harrison County, Iowa
- Allen Township, Polk County, Iowa
- Allen Township, Warren County, Iowa

== Kansas ==
- Allen Township, Jewell County, Kansas
- Allen Township, Kingman County, Kansas

== Michigan ==
- Allen Township, Michigan

== Missouri ==
- Allen Township, Worth County, Missouri

== North Dakota ==
- Allen Township, Kidder County, North Dakota, in Kidder County, North Dakota

== Ohio ==
- Allen Township, Darke County, Ohio
- Allen Township, Hancock County, Ohio
- Allen Township, Ottawa County, Ohio
- Allen Township, Union County, Ohio

== Pennsylvania ==
- Allen Township, Northampton County, Pennsylvania

== South Dakota ==
- Allen Township, Beadle County, South Dakota, in Beadle County, South Dakota
