= Yuelamu =

- Town
- Coordinates: 22°15′30″S 132°12′22″E
- Country: Australia
- State: Northern Territory

Population
  - Total: 149 (2021 census)
- Time zone: UTC+9:30 (ACST)
- Postcode: 0872

Yuelamu, also known as Mount Allan, Mount Allen, Alpirakina, and Alpirakinga, is a small town in the Northern Territory, Australia, located 298 kilometres (185 mi) north-west of Alice Springs, Its altitude is 687.1 metres (2,254 ft).

Yuelamu had a population of 149 at the 2021 census. It falls within the local government area of the Central Desert Regional Council, the governing land council is the Central Land Council, and it lies in the Gwoja electoral division of the Northern Territory. The land is owned and managed by the Yalpirakinu Aboriginal Land Trust, on land south of Mount Denison station.

It lies on land which was formerly Mount Allan station, also spelt Mount Allen station, which was carved out of the traditional lands of the Anmatyerre and Warlpiri peoples. Today, most of the population is of these two nations, and they still speak their languages at home.

The Yuelamu Art Gallery and Museum was officially opened by Hazel Hawke on 16 April 1988.

There is an airstrip close by, from which there are flights to and from Alice Springs. Access by road is via the Tanami Highway, with the turnoff about 65 kilometres (40 mi) past Tilmouth Well, with this last stretch being a dirt road of 31 kilometres (19 mi).

Mount Allan School is a coeducational government-run school, serving the years from prep/reception through to Year 12. There is also an early childhood centre, a clinic, a store, an aged care centre and a night patrol.
