= Alleine =

Alleine is a surname. Notable people with the surname include:

- Joseph Alleine (1634–1668), English Puritan Nonconformist pastor and author
- Richard Alleine (1611–1681), English Puritan divine

== See also ==
- "Alleine zu zweit" ("Alone Together"), a single by German/Finnish duo Lacrimosa released in 1999
- Alan (disambiguation)
- Alen (given name)
- Allan (disambiguation)
- Allen (disambiguation)
