= Alan, Iran =

Alan or Allan (Persian: الان), also known as Aland, in Iran may refer to:

- Alan, East Azerbaijan
- Alan, Gilan
- Alan-e Olya, Hamadan Province
- Alan-e Sofla, Hamadan Province
- Alan Rural District, in West Azerbaijan Province
