= Alan of Lynn =

Alan of Lynn (c. 1348 – after 1423), or Alanus de Lynna, was a famous English theologian of the first half of the fifteenth century.

He flourished about 1420. He was born at Lynn in Norfolk, and studied philosophy and theology at Cambridge with much credit, taking the degree of Doctor of Divinity there. He afterwards returned to his native place, where he entered the order of the Carmelites, and spent the rest of his life. He died in Norwich, where he had lived for many years.

Alan of Lynn was a most laborious writer, and left a multitude of books that were the fruits of his pen; but they seem to have been more remarkable for their number, than for any interest they are at present calculated to excite on the part of lay readers. He followed the taste which was common in his age, of expounding scripture allegorically; but he has been praised for his general method of treating theological subjects, and particularly for his diligence in making indexes. Alan de Lynn was much distinguished among his contemporaries for his talent in preaching, and was a friend or spiritual intimate of the mystic and controversialist Margery Kempe of Lynn.
