= Guaranty Building (Buffalo, New York) =

Early skyscraper in Buffalo, New York

- Guaranty Building (Prudential Building)
- U.S. National Register of Historic Places
- U.S. National Historic Landmark
- New York State Register of Historic Places

- Location within New York Location within the United States
- Interactive map of Guaranty Building (Prudential Building)
- Location: Church and Pearl Streets; Buffalo, New York, US
- Coordinates: 42°52′58″N 78°52′36″W
- Built: 1896
- Architects: Adler & Sullivan (Louis Sullivan and Dankmar Adler)
- Architectural style: Chicago school
- NRHP reference No.: 73001187
- NYSRHP No.: 02940.003035

Significant dates
- Added to NRHP: March 20, 1973
- Designated NHL: May 15, 1975
- Designated NYSRHP: June 23, 1980

The Guaranty Building (also known as the Prudential Building) is an office building at Church and Pearl streets in Buffalo, New York, United States. It was designed by Adler & Sullivan, the architectural partnership of Dankmar Adler and Louis Sullivan, and built between 1894 and 1896. The Guaranty Building, an early skyscraper largely patterned after the firm's earlier Wainwright Building in St. Louis, was the architects' final collaboration. The building is listed on the National Register of Historic Places, and it is designated as both a National Historic Landmark and a local landmark within the Joseph Ellicott Historic District.

Buffalo businessman and entrepreneur Hascal L. Taylor bought the site in 1890. After he died in 1894, the Guaranty Construction Company bought the site and plans—naming the project the Guaranty Building—and began construction in early 1895. The building opened in April 1896 and, as a precondition for a loan from Prudential Financial, was renamed the Prudential Building by 1899. Prudential bought the building in 1900 and owned it until 1945. The building was resold three times and was then renovated in the mid-1950s. The Prudential Building was damaged by a fire in 1974 and went into foreclosure, prompting concerns about potential demolition. A group of developers bought the structure and later resold it to Prudential Associates, which reinstated the building's original name and renovated it between 1981 and 1983. Law firm Hodgson Russ acquired the Guaranty Building in 2002 and renovated it again, occupying the entire building.

The structure is 13 stories or 167 feet (51 m) high, with a steel frame behind a facade of terracotta. The exterior is divided into three sections—a base, shaft, and capital—after the composition of a classical column. It originally had a U-shaped floor plan arranged around a light court, which was infilled during the 1980s renovation to create additional office space. There are storefronts at the base, vertical piers with recessed spandrels and windows in the shaft, and a frieze and cornice at the capital. The building sits on concrete footings, which support the steel frame. Inside, the first floor was intended for shops, while the upper stories had offices. The building also had mechanical equipment and storage space in the basement and mercantile space on the second floor. Over the years, the design has been praised, particularly for its terracotta decorations and steel frame. The building has also been detailed in various exhibits.

== Site ==
The Guaranty Building (also known as the Prudential Building) is located at 140 Pearl Street in Buffalo, New York, United States. It sits at the southwest corner with Church Street, where it has an alternate address of 30 Church Street. The land lot covers 10,790 square feet (1,002 m^{2}), with a frontage of 116 feet (35 m) on Church Street to the north and 93 feet (28 m) on Pearl Street to the east. As built, the site was originally surrounded by alleys on its other two frontages.

St. Paul's Cathedral, another National Historic Landmark designed by Richard Upjohn, is immediately across Pearl Street to the east. The former Erie County Savings Bank was diagonally across Church and Pearl streets to the northeast; the Christian Science Monitor wrote that these buildings made the intersection architecturally imposing. The Old Erie County and Buffalo City Hall is one block to the west. The Ellicott Square Building, designed by Daniel Burnham, is two blocks east, and the Liberty Building is two blocks to the north. Other nearby buildings include the Manufacturers and Traders Trust Building, as well as the Old Post Office three blocks east and St. Joseph Cathedral one block southwest.

The Guaranty Building occupies part of a site that was designated as Inner Lot No. 77 when Joseph Ellicott platted out Buffalo's street grid in 1804. Prior to the building's construction, the site had been occupied by a series of frame houses. The chain of land ownership dates to 1813, when the forests that previously occupied the site were cleared. By the 1890s, the houses on the site had deteriorated and been converted into tenements; at the time, they were characterized as a pair of frame houses on Church Street and seven one-and-a-half-story buildings on Pearl Street.

== History ==
=== Development ===
==== Land acquisition and design ====
The idea for the building was devised by Buffalo businessman and entrepreneur Hascal L. Taylor. Taylor, who became involved in banks and other commercial enterprises after moving to Buffalo in 1879, planned to construct a speculative office building downtown. By 1890, Taylor had acquired land at the corner of Church and Pearl streets for an office building. This site had enticed Taylor because of its proximity to other downtown structures such as the County and City Hall, St. Paul's Church, the Post Office, and the Erie County Savings Bank. Taylor briefly contemplated designing an opera house at the site, occupying the western half of the block, before deciding to proceed with an office building. The site was also easily accessible by a large network of streetcar lines, and local residents were advocating for the removal of the site's existing tenements.

Architects Dankmar Adler and Louis Sullivan, of Adler & Sullivan, were commissioned for the project, though it is unknown how they received the contract. Although Adler & Sullivan had designed 40 buildings following the completion of Chicago's Auditorium Building in 1889, they completed only two buildings together after 1893: the Chicago Stock Exchange Building and Taylor's project. The structures' development coincided with a financial crisis caused by the Panic of 1893, and Taylor's building was the only structure they completed after the crisis. Adler and Sullivan had finished their first drawings by July 1894. They completed their detailed drawings that November, and Taylor died the same month. The early drawings included a doorway with a frieze reading "Taylor Building", the building's original proposed name. Adler & Sullivan also hired a Chicago-based firm, the Guaranty Construction Company, to erect the building for $600,000. (Note: Equivalent to $20.2 million in 2025)

==== Construction ====
The Guaranty Construction Company's president, Chicago businessman George M. Moulton, acquired the site and Taylor's plans in December 1894, paying $200,000. (Note: Equivalent to $20.2 million in 2025) The project was renamed the Guaranty Building; at the time, the company anticipated that it would begin work the following February. Adler & Sullivan modified the plans slightly to add amenities such as a bicycle storage room and a barbershop. Moulton and two Buffalo businessmen incorporated the Guaranty Building Company in January 1895 to develop the building; by then, all existing leases had been acquired, and work was about to begin. Most of the building's contractors were also shareholders in the Guaranty Building Company.

The Guaranty Company received a construction permit in March, and contracts for the steelwork, brickwork, and terracotta had been awarded by that month. The Guaranty Company took out a $380,000 first mortgage on the building (Note: Equivalent to $12.8 million in 2025) and obtained a second mortgage of $120,000 that April. (Note: Equivalent to $4.0 million in 2025) The development process was accelerated, since the Guaranty Building faced competition from the developers of the Ellicott Square Building. Decorative elements were prefabricated off-site and then delivered to the building, rather than on-site, where workers from different trades could get in each other's way. The elevators and stairway were erected simultaneously with the steel frame. Interior finishes were then installed from the top story downward. In May 1895, the Guaranty Company also requested permission from the city government to construct a cellar vault underneath the sidewalk. The company rebuffed a Philadelphia hotelier's suggestion that the new building be used as a hotel.

Meanwhile, Adler had become fatigued by his frequent business trips and was considering taking a commission in New York City by himself. Since there was not enough money to hire a supervising architect, Adler stayed with Adler & Sullivan through 1895 to supervise the engineering and initial design. The steelwork was being completed by July, and Adler left the firm that month. Sullivan, now the sole leader of his architectural practice, returned to Buffalo in August 1895, observing that steelwork was being constructed quickly. The Guaranty Company had issued a prospectus for the building that October, and a contractor was killed that month after falling down a shaft. By December, the Guaranty Company had leased out 20% of the space, and the upper floors were finished. The Guaranty Building was supposed to be completed in January 1896, but the owners reported in February that work would take several more weeks. That March, just before the building opened, C. C. Ricker was appointed as the building's first manager. One of the building's laborers, who had been injured during construction, later sued the Guaranty Company and was awarded $12,500 in 1897. (Note: Equivalent to $416,000 in 2025)

=== Original offices ===
The Guaranty Building officially opened on April 4, 1896, having cost $550,000. (Note: Equivalent to $18.3 million in 2025) An estimated 15,000 people (but not Sullivan) visited on its first day. The Guaranty Building had the highest usable space in Buffalo (Note: St. Paul's Cathedral, however, is physically taller at 274 feet (84 m).) and, along with the Ellicott Square Building, one of the city's first steel-framed buildings. The Guaranty Company anticipated leasing out the space to lawyers and shipping companies, and it planned to open a bar and a restaurant. Over the years, the building's ground story came to include a variety of tenants, including banks, convenience stores, a restaurant, an optician, a barber, and general offices. The upper-story offices were rented to lawyers, business organizations, transport firms, industrial concerns, and other professionals. The basement had some stores but was mostly taken up by mechanical and storage functions. The 13th floor had no direct elevators and was used for storage, as well as management and architecture offices.

==== 1890s to 1920s ====
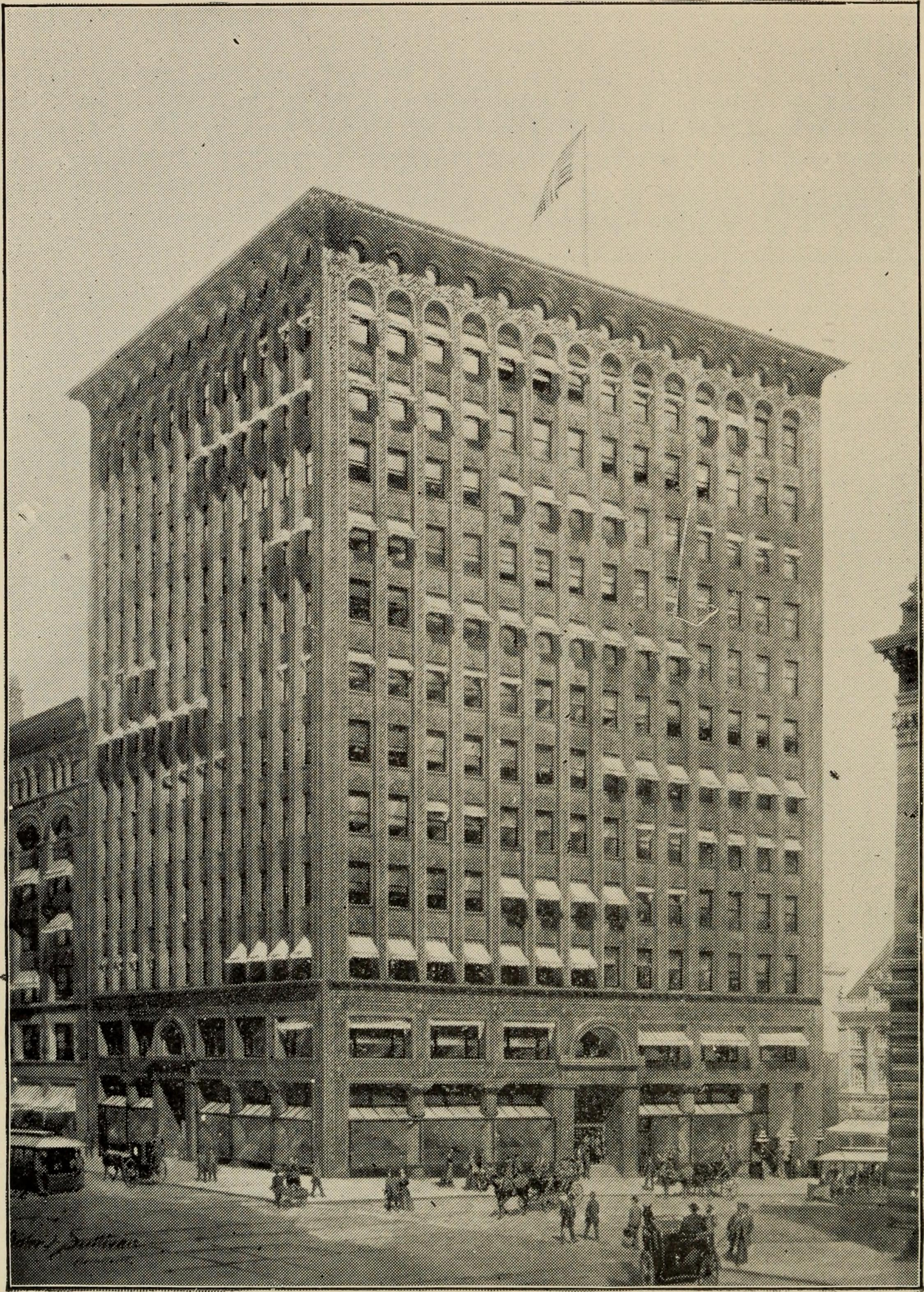
Seen in 1896, shortly after opening

At first, only about half of the offices were occupied, but there was high demand for offices on the top story, which faced Lake Erie nearby. Its first tenants included the US Weather Bureau (which had a suite on the 13th floor) and the Chicago & Alton Railroad. The building also hosted New Year's celebrations, and the roof had an observation deck, which for about a decade was open to the public for a 10-cent fee. Despite Taylor's intentions for the structure, the building struggled to make a profit, especially with competition from the Ellicott Square Building. In February 1898, the Guaranty Building became home to Prudential Financial, which refinanced the building with a $500,000 loan, (Note: Equivalent to $16.5 million in 2025) on the condition that it be renamed the Prudential Building. The Guaranty Building Company began seeking to sell the structure, which had been renamed by the next year.

The Prudential Building was sold outright in October 1900 to Prudential Financial in a transaction valued at approximately $1 million. (Note: Equivalent to $31.8 million in 2025) (Note: This is the figure given by contemporary news sources, but the Prudential Building Company later claimed to have paid only $181,000 in cash (equivalent to $5.8 million in 2025), taking over the $500,000 mortgage.) The firm established the Prudential Building Company, which took over the functions of the Guaranty Building Company. At the time, the building was consistently around 90% occupied, with rental rates of about $1.05 per square foot ($11.3/m^{2}). Taylor's estate never developed the site to the west, which was supposed to be an opera house connecting with the Prudential Building; the neighboring lot was sold off in 1903. The same year, the original electric elevators were replaced with hydraulic cabs. The Prudential Building Company was selling electricity to the neighboring St. Paul's Cathedral by 1909, prompting a complaint to the New York Public Service Commission, which ruled that the company was allowed to sell electricity to other buildings.

New tenants during the early 20th century included the Lackawanna Railroad, the Buffalo office of Turner Construction, the Postal Telegraph Company (which occupied large sections of four floors), and the Buffalo Aviation and Transport Corporation. One particularly long-lasting tenant was attorney Richard Wrey Werner, who moved his office to the building in 1915 and stayed for 64 years. The Weather Service was forced to move out around 1910, since the under-construction New York Telephone Company Building was taller than the Prudential Building, interfering with the agency's weather equipment. Over the years, gradual increases in the building's valuation prompted the Prudential Building Company to increase rental rates.

==== 1930s to 1960s ====
During the mid-20th century, the Prudential Building declined through neglect as office tenants sought more modern buildings. Modifications to the existing structure did not take into account the original design, to the building's further detriment. These modifications tended to punch through any original materials; original mosaic and marble decorations were covered up, and the ironwork was painted green. In 1939, Carl Schmill & Son was hired to reconfigure the layout of the first floor. The Prudential Building Company sold the Prudential Building in 1945 to a syndicate led by Leonard Downie of Chicago, who planned to repair the boilers, water pipes, elevators, and lobbies. The building's tenants during this time included Socony-Vacuum. Downie's group sold it again in 1947 to a group of New York City investors for $400,000. (Note: Equivalent to $4.5 million in 2025)

The building was subsequently managed by Irving L. W. Saperson, who placed it for sale in 1954. The building was sold again the next year to the Buffalo Holding Corporation. The corporation, led by Irving Becker of New York City, announced plans to spend $200,000 on renovations. (Note: Equivalent to $1.9 million in 2025) This work involved redecorating the offices inside and upgrading the elevator systems. Buffalo Holding also cleaned the building for the first time in its history, sandblasting the facade and applying a plastic membrane; this ended up damaging the facade. The building's stairs were also enclosed to comply with building codes, being surrounded by a concrete-block shaft. The Buffalo Holding Corporation took out a $735,000 mortgage on the building from James Hoffa in 1958.

In the early 1960s, further modifications were made to the first floor. The existing elevators were replaced with three electric cabs, requiring the addition of an elevator penthouse on the roof. The Buffalo and Erie County Historical Society installed a plaque on the Prudential Building in 1966, commemorating Sullivan and the building's construction. Tenants during this time included the University at Buffalo Law School and the New York Telephone Company, both of which moved out in 1973.

=== 1970s and early 1980s: Redevelopment ===
==== Foreclosure and demolition fears ====
In February 1974, a fire started on the Prudential Building's 10th floor and spread to the 9th through 13th floors, causing $300,000 in damage. (Note: Equivalent to $1.5 million in 2025) Large amounts of legal files, including some related to the defense of Attica Prison riot defendants, were destroyed. That October, the building's mortgage lender United Founders Life Insurance Corporation filed foreclosure proceedings against Buffalo Holding. By then, the building had 74 tenants, and it was in danger of destruction. Architect John D. Randall, who had previously campaigned to save Adler & Sullivan's Wainwright Building, requested that the New York state government provide a grant to fund a feasibility study on the Prudential Building's restoration. Governor Hugh Carey denied the grant after taking office in 1975. The next year, Randall founded the Louis Sullivan Museum, which moved into the building.

At a foreclosure auction in April 1977, United Founders bought the Prudential Building for $200,000. (Note: Equivalent to $0.8 million in 2025) The sale prompted fears that the building could be demolished, though United Founders agreed to instead search for another buyer. At the time, less than one-third of the building was occupied. The Prudential Building still attracted fans of Sullivan's work, some of whom came to Buffalo just to see it, it was not as popular as Frank Lloyd Wright's Darwin D. Martin House and was little-known among Buffalo residents. Randall became the building manager after offering to take the job for free.

Politicians and the National Trust for Historic Preservation proposed renovating and preserving the building as office space, and the Erie County Industrial Development Agency (ECIDA) proposed relocating there. Daniel Patrick Moynihan, who had come across the building during his 1976 campaign for New York's US Senate seat, was so impressed by the design that he joined the efforts to save the building, to the surprise of then-mayor Stanley Makowski. Moynihan reportedly said he would "rather see Mount Vernon torn down, or the White House". In December 1977, the Greater Buffalo Development Foundation proposed renovating the Prudential Building for $6.7 million, (Note: Equivalent to $27.7 million in 2025) a plan endorsed by Moynihan and state Assemblyman William B. Hoyt. United Founders subsequently received bids from four groups to acquire the building.

==== Renovation ====
Storefronts at the 1st story

United Founders tentatively agreed in March 1978 to sell the Prudential Building to an anonymous local group, which proposed hiring architects CannonDesign to renovate the building. The new owners were later identified as 28 Church Street Associates, a partnership between the town government of Tonawanda, developer Jack Shifrin, and consultant Stanley Thea. They proposed filling in the light court to create offices (following a proposal by the Greater Buffalo Development Foundation), in addition to new utilities and a restoration of the lobby. This project, to cost $5 million, (Note: Equivalent to $17.9 million in 2025) would be partly funded by the federal Urban Development Action Grant (UDAG) program. The ECIDA moved its offices to the Prudential Building in January 1979 but moved out after six months because the Prudential Building lacked proper climate control. By mid-1980, the building's co-owners were considering enlisting another co-owner to help fund the project, whose cost had increased to $8.4 million. (Note: Equivalent to $25.1 million in 2025)

Developer Arthur D. Emil and lawyer John J. Ferchill, who led a group called Prudential Associates, ultimately agreed to buy out 28 Church Street Associates' ownership stake in 1981. The new owners expected to pay a combined $9.6 million for the building and the project. (Note: Equivalent to $28.7 million in 2025) Emil and Ferchill hired CannonDesign as the renovation architect and DePolo/Dunbar Inc. as interior consultant. The owners proposed cleaning the facade, infilling the light court, restoring the lowest two stories, and converting the 11 upper stories to offices. Partitions would also be dismantled, since modern tenants sought open plan spaces rather than small offices. The project received a $2.4 million UDAG loan, in addition to $6 million from the Bank of New York (BNY). (Note: Equivalent to $7.2 million from the UDAG program, $18.0 million from BNY, and $3.6 million from Investor Equity in 2025) CannonDesign began soliciting bids for the renovation that November.

Emil, Ferchill, and developer Arthur Collins finalized their acquisition of the building in January 1982, paying $1.369 million (Note: Equivalent to $3.9 million in 2025) and taking responsibility for the unpaid balance of the building's mortgage. That September, the Prudential Building was formally renamed the Guaranty Building, its original name. Work involved restoration of terracotta and brickwork, elevator grilles, and a staircase. The formal rededication was delayed several months because of difficulties restoring some of the original materials and design details. By late 1983, with the renovation nearly complete, Prudential Associates had leased out four floors to tenants such as law firm Hodgson Russ Andrews Woods and Goodyear, who had represented Prudential Associates as counsel during the renovation. The renovation cost at least $8 million, (Note: Equivalent to $21.7 million in 2025) (Note: Another source puts the cost at $12.4 million (equivalent to $33.6 million in 2025).) and the developers made agreements with the Buffalo and Erie County governments, allowing them to make payments in lieu of taxes (PILOT).

=== Post-redevelopment ===
==== 1983–2002: Prudential Associates ownership ====
The Guaranty Building (right) and St. Paul's Cathedral (left) as seen from nearby Division Street

The Guaranty Building was formally rededicated in December 1983. By then, half the building had been rented out, while the remaining vacant space was left bare for future tenants to furnish. After the building was restored, its tenants included CannonDesign and a branch of the Central Trust Company. Moynihan also had an office in the building. High demand for tours prompted the owners to arrange with the Louis Sullivan Museum to provide guided tours. The museum itself never moved back in; Randall moved the museum to California in 1984 after he and the building's owners were unable to agree on an acceptable location within the building. By 1984, the building was 75% occupied. The building's tenants in the 1990s included HealthCarePlan (which occupied half the office space) and law firm Lippes Silverstein Mathias & Wexler. The structure continued to attract architecture fans.

Hodgson Russ, which had occupied the top three stories, moved out in 1995 after failing to buy out other tenants' leases. After HealthCarePlan considered moving out of the building in 1996, Prudential Associates sought PILOT relief and asked one of its mortgage lenders, the Buffalo Enterprise Development Corporation (BEDC), to forgive most of the debt on its loan. At the time, the group owed hundreds of thousands of dollars to four lenders, one of whom wanted to foreclose on its loan. The city, county, and BEDC agreed to forgive most of the outstanding debt owed to them, and the city government approved a parking subsidy in an attempt to entice HealthCarePlan to stay. Prudential Associates filed for Chapter 11 bankruptcy protection anyway in 1998. The building was 96% occupied by then, with vacant space only in the basement and 2nd floor. Ultimately, HealthCarePlan moved out in 1999.

By the early 2000s, the building was only 30% occupied; its remaining tenants included Lippes Silverstein, the Internal Revenue Service, and US senator Hillary Clinton's office. The Washington Monthly wrote that the storefronts were unoccupied, and that "its lobby is now dark and still enough to serve as a set for an old horror movie". Prudential Building Associates owed $1.4 million in taxes to the city. Hodgson Russ took three floors of HealthCarePlan's former space during that time. The firm wanted to buy the Guaranty Building outright, enticed by the building's history and downtown location, and it began buying up the mortgages in late 2001. Hodgson Russ had bought all the mortgages by early 2002, and a bankruptcy auction for the building was scheduled later that year. By then, a bankruptcy court had ordered the erection of scaffolding outside the building due to unsafe facade conditions.

==== 2002–present: Hodgson Russ ownership ====
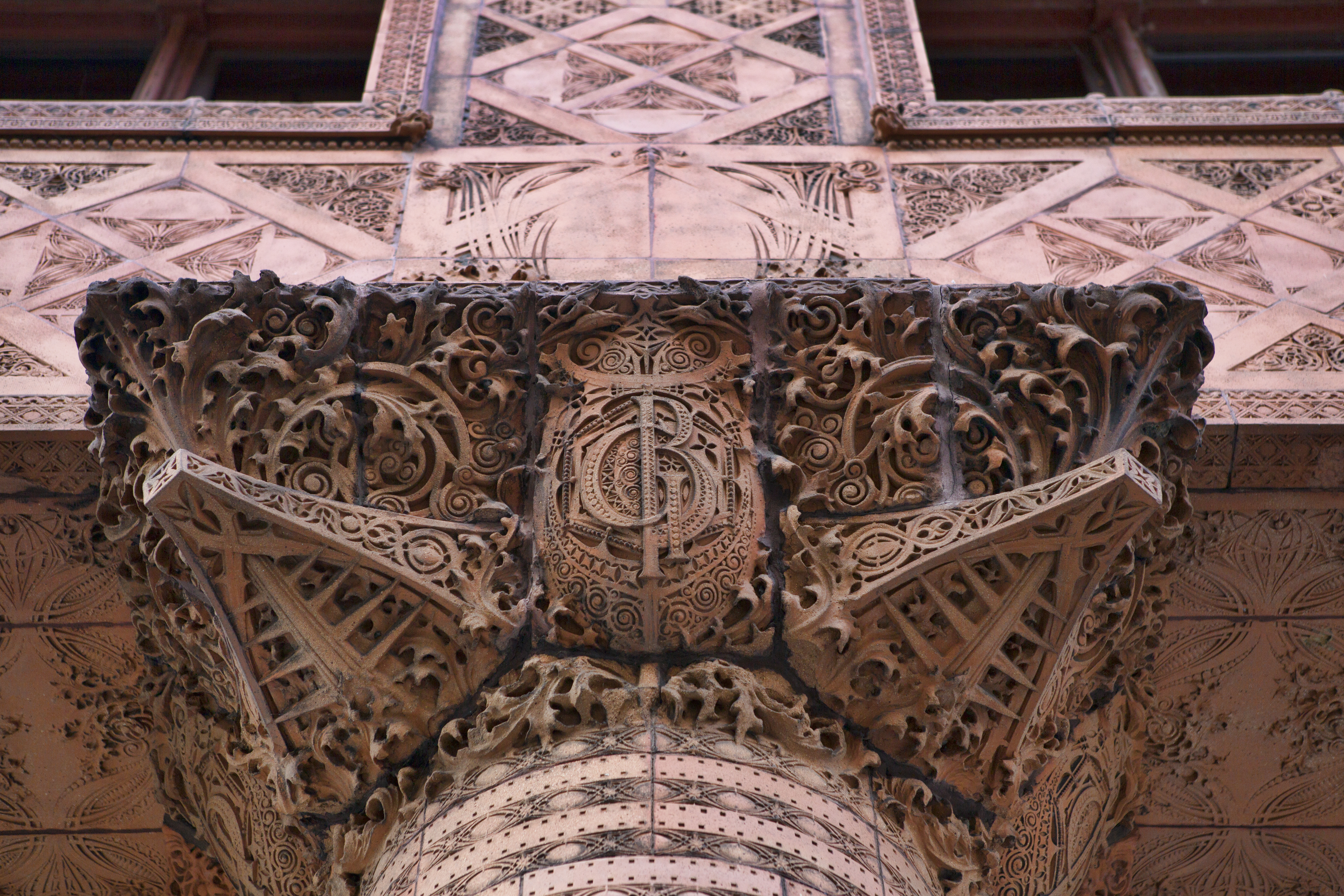
Decorative capital on a column

Hodgson Russ acquired the building in October 2002 at the bankruptcy auction, where it was the only bidder. Since the firm held leases in other buildings nearby, it did not plan to fully occupy the Guaranty Building for several years, but Hodgson Russ officials said they would not renew existing leases when they expired. Lippes Silverstein Mathias & Wexler began moving out in 2004. After most other tenants had moved out, the building underwent a further series of restorations starting in 2006. As part of the project, the 1st floor was restored, and the upper floors and basement were fitted out for Hodgson Russ. The restoration, which totaled $15.6 million, was designed by Gensler Architects of Washington, D.C.; M/E Engineering of Buffalo; and Flynn Battaglia Architects of Buffalo.

Part of the renovation was delayed because the federal General Services Administration (GSA), which leased the 2nd through 5th floors for Drug Enforcement Administration (DEA) and Internal Revenue Service (IRS) offices, had failed to find alternative office space. Hodgson Russ filed suit in June 2007 to evict the GSA, and the IRS announced plans to move out that August, upon which workers were renovating the basement and first floor. The GSA used eminent domain to prevent the eviction of the DEA, the building's last remaining federal tenant, but the GSA ultimately found new offices for the DEA that September after pressure from US senator Chuck Schumer and representative Brian Higgins. After the rehabilitation was completed in 2008, Hodgson Russ occupied the entire building. The renovation received the Preservation League of New York State's 2010 award for excellence in historic preservation.

Hodgson Russ was unable to accommodate all its departments in the building; by the 2010s, the accounting and information technology divisions were located elsewhere. The building also initially did not host tours, other than through a small docent program, prompting Hodgson Russ to erect a visitor center within a ground-floor conference room. The visitor center opened in 2017, with exhibits such as a scale model of the structure. The Guaranty Building was temporarily closed in 2025 when a neighboring building burned down, causing an estimated $750,000 in structural damage.

== Architecture ==
The building seen from one block east

The Guaranty Building is an early skyscraper, designed by Adler & Sullivan in a Sullivanesque or Chicago school style. As with other Adler & Sullivan buildings, Dankmar Adler was responsible for the building's engineering, while Louis Sullivan supervised design. For their projects, Sullivan worked with a trusted draftsman; by the 1890s, he was assisted by George Grant Elmslie, who developed the Guaranty Building's decorative details. James H. Gray, Adler & Sullivan's structural engineer, also worked on the Guaranty Building's engineering, and Kristian Schneider developed models for the decorative motifs. The building's construction involved numerous contractors, such as steel supplier Pencoyd Iron Works, enameled-brick supplier Tiffany Brick Company, terracotta supplier Northwestern Terra Cotta Company, and partition manufacturer Pioneer Fireproofing Construction Company.

The building's design continues the "form follows function" philosophy advanced by Sullivan, which he had used previously for the Wainwright Building in St. Louis. Because Adler left the firm during construction, the firm of Adler & Sullivan is credited on early construction drawings, but drawings from November 1895 onward (after Adler's departure) bear Sullivan's name alone. Adler believed the lack of credit for the plans was due to Sullivan's conflict with him. However, the developer had also considered Sullivan the building's main architect, and historian Narciso Menocal wrote that Sullivan had been troubled by public perceptions of him as primarily a decorator.

The Guaranty Building's design largely copied that of the Wainwright Building with some refinements, and Sullivan himself regarded them as sister structures. Both buildings have many characteristics in common, such as corner lots, U-shaped layouts, exterior articulation, and floor heights. The two buildings share many of the ideals espoused in Sullivan's 1896 essay "The Tall Office Building Artistically Considered", published two months after the Guaranty Building's completion. In that essay, Sullivan had written that a skyscraper "must be tall, every inch of it tall. The force and power of altitude must be in it the glory and pride of exaltation must be in it." By contrast, Adler believed that "the purpose of erecting buildings other than those required for the shelter of their owners is specifically that of making investments for profit." Because of the similarities in the Wainwright and Guaranty designs, Sullivan was described by his mentee Frank Lloyd Wright as "essentially a man of one building". Some of the building's original decorations have been removed; for example, one of the doorknobs was sold off in 1977 for about $900, and a window pull was acquired by Tim Samuelson of the Chicago Historical Society.

=== Form ===
The building's form, or configuration, is based around what historian Joseph Siry described as "unit lengths" and "unit widths", which are smaller than the corresponding dimensions used in the Wainwright Building. In the north–south direction, the building is divided into 13 unit lengths of 7 feet 2 inches (2.18 m) each, and in the west–east direction, the building is divided into 15 unit widths of 7 feet 9 inches (2.36 m) each. The Guaranty Building also has a smaller lot area compared to the Wainwright Building. To compensate for the smaller area, the Guaranty Building is higher than its predecessor, with 13 stories rising to a total height of 167 feet (51 m). (Note: Randall 1980, p. 22, gives a slightly different figure of 165 feet (50 m).)

The Guaranty Building originally had a rectangular floor plan on the 1st story and a U-shaped floor plan above. The U-shaped upper stories were originally arranged around a light court to the south, a variation of the "Chicago Quarter Block" office building layout popular across the US. This light court measured 25 by 53 feet (7.6 by 16.2 m). The light court was infilled in the 1980s, when enclosed stairways, electrical and mechanical equipment, and office space was built inside. The west wing of the U has a chimney on the southern wall. An additional side court, measuring 12 by 53 feet (3.7 by 16.2 m) across, is placed alongside one wing of the U.

=== Facade ===
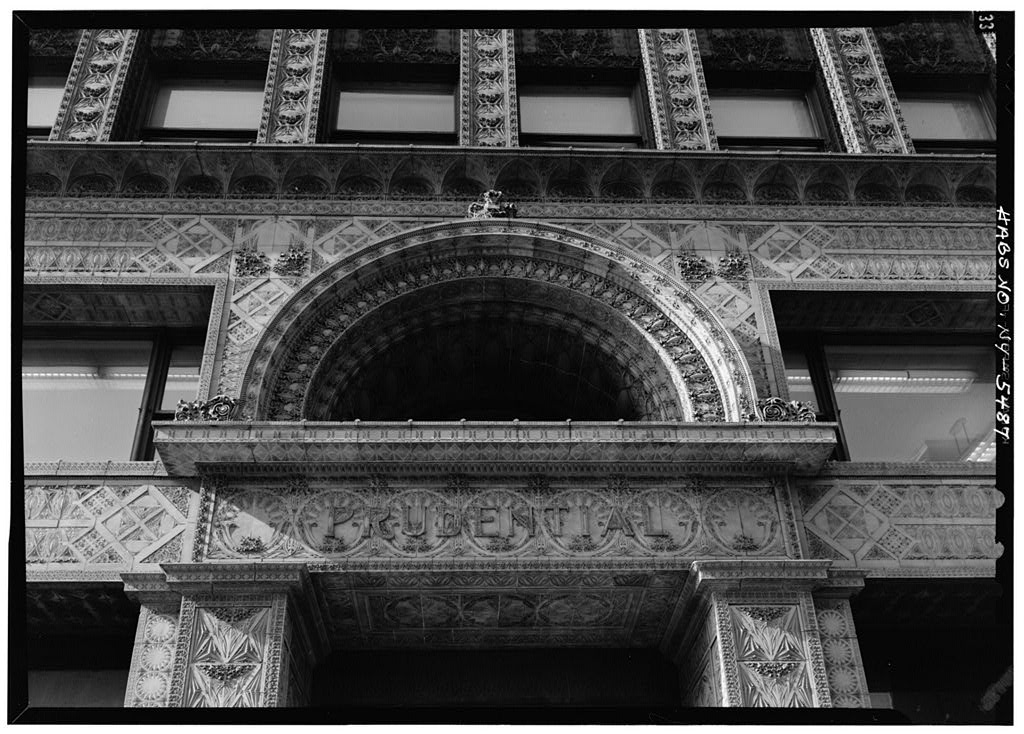
Detailed ornamentation above the building's entrance

The facade has a tripartite horizontal division—a two-story base, ten-story shaft, and one-story capital—after the composition of a classical column. The tripartite design, also used on the Wainwright Building, contrasted with high-rise designs such as the Reliance Building or the Tacoma Building, which focused on what writer Richard Etlin called "rational industrial production". The Guaranty Building's facade differs from the Wainwright's in other respects, including the use of wider Chicago windows and deviations in the designs of the vertical piers and horizontal spandrels. The vertical details also contrasted with Adler & Sullivan's previous work, which had been designed with input from Frank Lloyd Wright, a former draftsman who tended toward horizontal motifs in his designs.

The facade consists of rectangular red terracotta blocks, which cover the piers and spandrels. The hue of the blocks is variously described as deep red, salmon-red, red-orange, light brown-orange, ocher, or pinkish. All the terracotta is cast into blocks measuring no more than 2 by 2 feet (0.61 by 0.61 m) across, attached to perimeter walls made of common brick. The side walls are made of common red brick, and the light court is clad in white reflective tile. There are also 625 windows throughout the building.

The non-load-bearing terracotta exterior has elaborate decorations, which were intended to express both the building's high-rise nature and the interiors' horizontal subdivision. These decorations differentiated the Guaranty Building from its contemporaries, which used ornamentation only on non-structural elements. Though the Wainwright Building had also used piers to conceal its skeleton, Sullivan used ornamentation to an even greater extent in the Guaranty Building. Sullivan wished to use a more ornate facade than the rugged cladding he used for the Auditorium Building. The terracotta blocks have organic and geometric decorations, some of which are executed in relief. The relief is relatively flat, while other decorations are more elaborate intertwined motifs, such as variants of germinating seeds. Different styles of blocks divide the building into three horizontal sections. Adler perceived the ornamentation as something that could be used to attract tenants to the building. Historians William Jordy and William Pierson Jr. retrospectively wrote that the decorations were a "culmination" of Adler & Sullivan's previous office designs, which tended to be increasingly ornate.

==== Base ====
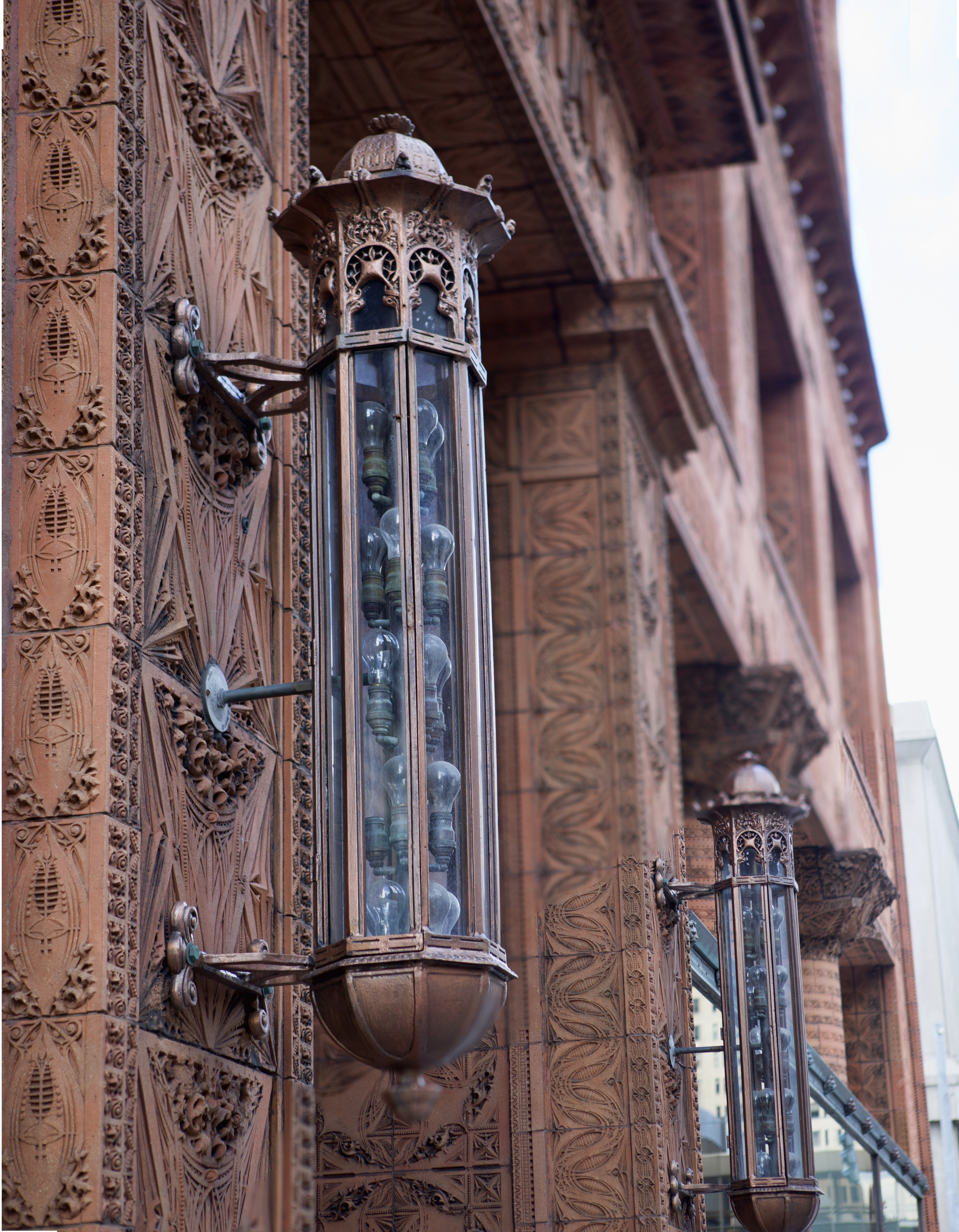
Both entryways originally had long cylindrical, cast-iron and glass wall lamps on either side.

At the base, rhombus-shaped decorations are overlaid to form double arrows. There are seven bays per floor on Church Street and six on Pearl Street. The base's openings are delineated by cylindrical columns at the 1st story, which are topped by elaborate capitals that depict foliate motifs and a building monogram. Sullivan wanted the cylindrical columns to create a feeling of lightness, contrasting with the Wainwright design, where the firm had used more blocky rectangular piers. The 1st (ground) story has wide windows, which have slanting sections partway up each bay. Below the slanting panels, the bottom two-thirds of each window have protruding storefronts, with brass lion-head downspouts attached to them; the top third has a recessed clerestory. The window configuration allowed for larger storefront windows interrupted by fewer columns. The soffits, visible above the recessed clerestory, are also ornately decorated with terracotta.

The Church and Pearl Street elevations have similar entrances, which are recessed from a double-height archway. The entrances are accessed by slightly elevated stoops, which contain three steps on Church Street and one on Pearl Street. Each entryway is flanked by terracotta piers, which support an entablature, decorated with the building's name overlaid onto a series of circles. Both entryways have long cylindrical, cast-iron and glass wall lamps on either side. Recessed within the entrance itself are aluminum and glass doors, above which are a bronze lintel and an arcade of five arches. The 2nd floor of each entrance has a protruding lunette with an elaborate frame. Open stairways to the basement and 1st floor protrude into the sidewalk at the northwest corner of the building. At the building's northwest corner, two lampposts flank external stairs to the basement restaurant, bypassing the lobby altogether.

The 2nd story contains Chicago windows recessed between ornamental piers. Each of the 2nd-story windows consists of a large central pane flanked by a pair of narrow, double-hung sash windows. A deep molding extends horizontally above the base, forming a windowsill beneath the 3rd-story windows, similar to the Wainwright Building. The molded band consists of cove motifs (with eight coves per bay), and wraps around the street corner. Night lighting was installed within the band, wrapping around the 2nd story. Sullivan's original conception also called for gilding around the 2nd-story windows. Sullivan later reused a variation of the base's facade configuration—a two-story base with wide windows, topped by a terracotta shaft—for the Bayard–Condict Building.

==== Shaft ====
The shaft rises ten stories. The piers in the center of each elevation (between the windows) have identical appearances. Half of the center piers function as primary piers, with structural steel columns, alternating with secondary piers. This is a continuation of a design principle previously used in the Wainwright Building, except that the Guaranty Building's secondary piers have smaller structural steel columns behind them. The primary piers are differentiated by the fact that they extend down to the base. The use of identical primary and secondary piers contrasted with Sullivan's unbuilt Trust and Savings Building, where nonstructural piers had been treated as mullions. The decorations on the piers include elaborate geometric and foliate motifs, such as interlocking triangles and mandala patterns. There are eight layers of interlocking triangles per pier on each story.

Between the piers are recessed double-hung windows, two per ground-story bay. In his 1896 essay, Sullivan compared the windows in "a cell in a honeycomb, nothing more". The windows are separated by recessed spandrel panels. The recessed spandrel panels, in combination, create the appearance of horizontal ribbons interrupted by the piers, which creates a grid. Due to the site constraints, the light court lacked piers, unlike in the Wainwright Building. The light court did contain terracotta band courses and flat decorations.

==== Capital ====
Detail of the shaft's upper stories and the capital

The top (13th) floor was designed in a style that historian Robert Twombly likened to a trompe-l'œil. Unlike contemporary structures that treated their attics as excess "dead space", the 13th floor was intended as a fully functional office floor. The Guaranty Building has large circular oculus windows at its top story, each measuring about 4.5 feet (1.4 m) in diameter, recessed within deep reveals at their tops. The windows are surrounded by foliated frames, similar to the Jayne Building that Sullivan had seen in Philadelphia. They contrast with the Wainwright Building, where tiny pinpoint windows are concealed within a frieze.

There is a coved cornice at the top of the building, which curves outward as it ascends. The cornice, supported by roof beams that cantilever 5 feet (1.5 m) outward, has flat geometric patterns and is overlaid by the foliate ornamentation at the top of the piers. Above the cornice is the building's flat roof, which is made of fire clay tiles.

=== Structural and mechanical features ===
The Guaranty Building sits on a foundation of reinforced concrete footings, which descend to 30 feet (9.1 m) below grade. The interior columns are spaced 15 feet (4.6 m) apart, equivalent to about two unit widths or unit lengths. The column spacing is far smaller than modern office buildings, where columns tend to be more than twice as far apart. There are 33 columns along the building's perimeter and 15 within the floor plan itself. On the upper stories, the columns behind the facade's secondary piers are supported on beams that cross the third floor; this helped stiffen the building, as opposed to the Wainwright Building, which lacked any structural support behind its secondary piers. The building uses Gray columns developed by James Gray, which consist of open webs for stiffening.

The steel framework holds up floor slabs and partitions made of fire-clay tile. The floor slabs can carry loads of 199 pounds per square foot (970 kg/m^{2}) and sit on purlins that are spaced 6–8 feet (1.8–2.4 m) apart. Each floor slab measures about 10 inches (250 mm) thick and is topped by a layer of concrete, sleepers, and wood-finished floors. The slab-to-slab height of each story varies, with higher ceilings on lower stories: 18 feet (5.5 m) on the ground floor and 13 feet (4.0 m) on the 2nd floor. Each office story generally has 11-foot (3.4 m) ceilings.

Originally, fresh air was provided to all rooms using a vacuum ventilating system. There were three coal-fired boilers, along with a forced-air circulation in one wing, accommodating a 6-foot-wide (1.8 m) pipe and various smaller pipes. The building originally had radiators, later supplanted by convection heaters. The original lighting system was simple, with lamps in the lobby spaces, vestibules, and corridors, as well as one lamp per offices. Each room had its own sink, and there were drinking fountains on each floor. Aside from that, there were communal bathrooms on the 7th floor (see Guaranty Building (Buffalo, New York) § Upper stories). The building originally lacked sprinklers and relied on fire extinguishers for fire suppression.

=== Interior ===
The building was originally cited as having 128,000 square feet (11,900 m^{2}), 131,500 square feet (12,220 m^{2}), or 140,244 square feet (13,029.1 m^{2}) of gross floor area. The gross floor area was expanded to 156,144 square feet (14,506.3 m^{2}) in the 1980s. The arrangement of the levels largely conforms to the optimal office-building layout Sullivan mentioned in his 1896 essay. The essay outlined a building with below-grade mechanical and utility areas; a ground floor with public shops; a 2nd story with publicly accessible offices; an intermediate section with private offices; and a utilitarian attic. The rentable area is only about 58% of the gross floor area: 10,100 square feet (940 m^{2}) each in the basement and ground story, and 6,800 to 7,200 square feet (630 to 670 m^{2}) on each of the upper stories.

Four elevators provide vertical circulation through the building. The original elevators consisted of bronzed ironwork cages, with glass walls facing the light court; they have been replaced with enclosed elevator cabs to meet fire safety codes. A then-novel system of illuminated glass globes indicated which elevator would be the next to travel up or down. One stairwell originally connected all the stories; the original stairwell is clad with white glazed terracotta, the same material used in the light court, to increase reflectivity. A second stair was built during the 1980s for fire-code compliance. The building also incorporated elaborate metalwork and household hardware. Solid bronze was used for ground-level hardware, while electroplated iron was used elsewhere in the lobby, elevators, and stairs; the upper stories had black iron hardware. All these interior decorations were designed by Sullivan. Deterioration and renovations over the years have concealed, damaged, or destroyed many of the original decorative details.

==== Ground floor ====
Floor plan of the ground floor, with south at the top

The building's ground-floor lobby is accessed from both Church and Pearl streets. They originally included marble wainscoting and mosaic floor tiles. Mosaic friezes ran above the wainscoting. There were also elaborate electroplated iron ceiling panels with leaf and petal designs, which surrounded light fixtures.

From the Church Street entrance, a vestibule leads to the northern part of the lobby, a west–east hall serving the elevators. The lobby has a 17-foot-high (5.2 m) ceiling decorated with a mosaic pattern by Sullivan, along with plasterwork covered by geometric mosaics. West of the elevator bank, a staircase ascends to the 2nd floor; it was later surrounded by a concrete enclosure, which was removed when a second stair was built. Doorways from the lobby lead to a 14-by-18-foot (4.3 by 5.5 m) shop just west of the vestibule, a 33-by-59-foot (10 by 18 m) space at the ground floor's northwest corner, and a 49-by-46-foot (15 by 14 m) space at the northeast corner. The northeast-corner storefront was originally intended as a bank.

First-floor interior

Another vestibule, reached by the Pearl Street entrance, leads to the south end of the lobby, a second west–east hall. Located behind the elevators, it connects with a stair to the basement and the northwestern storefront at its western end. The southern section has a 450-square-foot (42 m^{2}) mosaic stained-glass ceiling with green, yellow, and mauve circular panels surrounded by cast-iron frames. A cantilevered landing between the 1st and 2nd floors was visible within the southern west–east hall; it had cast-iron elements with Sullivanesque ornament. A stair from the basement connects with the west end of this hall. Two doors from the hall lead a 31-by-101-foot (9.4 by 30.8 m) commercial area along the south side of the building. The southern hall is illuminated by skylights beneath the light court.

==== Other lower-story spaces ====
Although the arrangement of levels is otherwise similar in composition to the Wainwright Building, the Guaranty Building contains large open plan mercantile spaces, rather than offices, at the 2nd floor. The interconnected offices on the north side of the 2nd floor each correspond to one window, while the wings facing the court were open plan places. Following the 2000s renovation, the 2nd floor became a law library and some conference rooms.

The 1st floor's northeast bank room had a semicircular stairway leading to the basement. The basement itself had a large storeroom and vault at the northeast corner, a large restaurant along the north wall, and a kitchen on the west wall. The basement also housed the boilers and electrical plant, along with an ice machine that supplied the building's drinking water. These mechanical functions took up much of the basement's space. A bicycle storage room, consisting of private lockers in the basement, was also provided for in the original design. The basement became an employee dining room for Hodgson Russ during the 2000s.

==== Upper stories ====
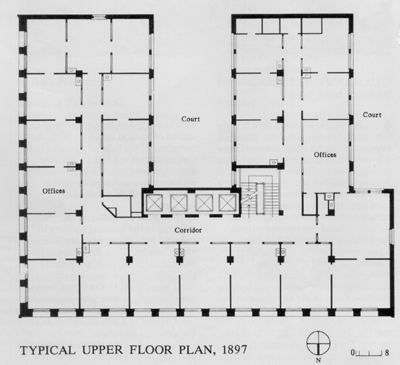
Typical upper floor plan

From the 3rd story upward, each floor had a U-shaped corridor flanked by offices. As built, there were 240 offices in the building, which had been increased to 275 offices by the mid-20th century. Due to the Guaranty Building's smaller unit dimensions relative to the Wainwright Building, it had shallow offices, which were generally no more than 40 feet (12 m) from the nearest corridor and measured 210 to 370 square feet (20 to 34 m^{2}). Larger offices were situated in the 2nd and 13th floor's wings. The offices were separated by movable partitions, which could be attached to the facade's piers. As originally configured, each office adjoined at least two windows. As with the Wainwright Building, the offices on each floor occupied only 53% of the lot area prior to the 1980s expansion.

The two lowest office stories had Tennessee marble finishes with mahogany wainscoting, while the other offices had oak wainscoting. The floors had elaborate marble mosaics. Stairway halls, corridors, and restrooms had pink Tennessee marble wainscoting; this wainscoting measured 4 feet (1.2 m) high in the corridors. Elevator shafts and stairways were faced with glazed brick. The offices' doors originally had plate glass panels, and all ceilings and the offices' walls were made of plaster. Bronze light fixtures and chains were hung from the ceilings. Coat cabinets, oak telephone closets, and storage vaults were also placed throughout the building; the storage vaults especially were intended for law firms, which were intended to serve a large legal clientele.

The 13th floor, not originally accessible via elevators, contained offices on its eastern and northern frontage. As originally configured, the 13th floor's west wing had a large storage room, locker rooms for janitors and elevator operators, a fan chamber, and a stair to the roof. There was another storage room on the east wing's western frontage. On the 7th floor, there were sinks, separate ladies' and gentlemen's bathrooms, and a barbershop. The office floors had been extensively configured, and the 7th-floor bathrooms and barbershop had been removed, by the late 20th century. Since the 2000s, Hodgson Russ has used the 3rd floor as administrative offices. On the other upper stories, law offices have been built on the perimeter, while the center portions of each story became legal support spaces.

== Impact and legacy ==
The Guaranty Building is one of two remaining Sullivan commissions in New York, alongside the Bayard–Condict Building (pictured) in New York City.

The building's opening, along with the near-simultaneous publication of an architectural article by Montgomery Schuyler, helped bolster Adler & Sullivan's reputation. Even so, the Guaranty Building was Adler & Sullivan's final collaboration, as well as one of Sullivan's final large-scale designs and one of Adler's last designs of any type. Sullivan had difficulties obtaining other large commissions in later years, even as he rebuffed Adler's later efforts to rejoin the firm. After the Bayard–Condict, Carson Pirie Scott, and Gage Group buildings were completed, Sullivan was hired exclusively for smaller works such as the Van Allen Building and jewel box banks. The Guaranty Building is one of two remaining Sullivan designs in New York, alongside the Bayard–Condict Building in New York City, and one of about three dozen Sullivan designs that survived into the late 20th century. Its design helped influence successive early skyscrapers.

=== Reception ===
At the Guaranty Building's opening, Brick magazine wrote that the building was noteworthy for "the remarkable beauty of its wealth of ornamentation", rather than its height or its steel frame. The Buffalo Courier-Express wrote that "it is finer in many ways than any other office-building in the country", owing to its interior decoration, and the Buffalo Evening News called it "peerless among its class in America beyond all possibility of contradiction". Schuyler wrote that the steel frame was "palpably felt through the envelope of baked clay", and Claude Bragdon wrote that the building was "rich in those little felicities which reveal the artist", such as the terracotta decorations. Bragdon said in 1903 that the building "was entirely Gothic in spirit" and was Sullivan's masterpiece. Following Sullivan's death, in the 1920s, architect Howard Robertson wrote that the building demonstrated "practically all those features which have been characteristic of the best designs in tall buildings to-day", and The New York Times called it a predecessor to modernist steel-and-glass skyscrapers.

In 1951, modernist architect Philip Johnson described the building as a "great monument of a past period". Industrial designer George Nelson said in the next decade that the building was a "bold stride" for its time, naming it one of fourteen "great American structures". During the late 20th century, The Globe and Mail wrote that the building "still stands as a landmark in the cult of the skyscraper" and that the decorations "exemplify Louis Sullivan's love for geometry and intricate detail". The Buffalo News wrote that the building was "one of Buffalo's most precious architectural treasures". Jay Henry wrote in 1993 that the Guaranty Building was "perhaps the Chicago school's tour de force". The New York Times, in 2003, said the building expressed "a complex philosophy about manmade and natural forms". Commenters also described the building as one of Buffalo's architectural masterpieces, alongside the Darwin D. Martin House, St. Paul's Cathedral, and the Buffalo State Hospital Complex.

==== Ornamentation commentary ====
The terracotta decorations were both praised and derided.

Commentators also opined on the symbolism of the Guaranty Building's decoration, which, The Canadian Architect wrote, constituted "a particularly striking example" of decorative terracotta. Barr Ferree wrote in 1895, "though possibly the most richly decorated commercial building in America, the skill of the artist has produced a design of structural sobriety with great richness of effect." Vincent Scully and William J.R. Curtis, analyzing the ornament independently, both described it as a physical expression of tension. Paul Edward Sprague felt that the Guaranty Building indicated Sullivan's evolution as an artist, stating that Sullivan's ornament was influenced by that of Frank Furness. Tom Beeby described Sullivan as the "high-priest of controlled natural ornament", and Chicago History magazine called the structure an example of Sullivan's "masterful use of terracotta". Artforum said the terracotta motifs created a "glorious and vibrant oneness".

While Sullivan's use of elaborate terracotta decoration was praised by his followers, it was also derided as "fussy and superfluous". Hugh Morrison wrote that the decorative treatment was "effective in itself" but perceived the top story's design as unsatisfactory, since it did not resemble a frieze. Richard MacCormac considered the building's U-shaped plan "curiously banal" and more akin to a hotel.

The Guaranty deviated significantly from the Wainwright because the expression "of the underlying steel-frame construction behind the red terracotta tiles is more apparent here than in the Wainwright." David Van Zanten found the Wainwright Building's ornament performed a "traditional, even if exceptionally conspicuous, role in its design" compared to the Guaranty. Historians William Pierson Jr. and William Jordy wrote that "the Wainwright is the block the life, whereas the Guaranty is the linear element and the thin-skinned volume arbitrarily returned to a block-like density and compactness in the interest of emotional impact". Pierson and Jordy wrote that, out of Sullivan's works, the Guaranty and Carson Pirie Scott buildings were most commonly upheld as examples of Sullivan's use of ornate ornament. Henry Hope Reed wrote that the building's ornamentation represented Sullivan's transition to a "more exuberant but less architonic phase" of design, as carried out in the Bayard–Condict, Carson Pirie Scott, and National Farmers' Bank of Owatonna buildings.

==== Redevelopment commentary ====
After the Guaranty Building was renovated in the 1980s, Paul Goldberger wrote that the Guaranty "may be Sullivan's greatest commercial building" and that, despite the infilling of the original light court, the building remained "a strong, potent presence". Goldberger wrote that the building "now seems not at all like an antique" and was an essential part of Buffalo, like the New York Public Library Main Branch was for New York City. Pierson and Jordy described the Guaranty Building's design as commanding yet poignant, and they said the renovations of the Guaranty and Wainwright buildings were "especially gratifying" given that both buildings were threatened with demolition. In recognition of the renovation, the Greater Buffalo Building Owners and Managers Associations named the Guaranty Building its building of the year in 1987.

=== Media and landmark designations ===
The Guaranty Building was first added to the National Register of Historic Places in 1973. It was further declared a National Historic Landmark in 1975, becoming one of several Adler & Sullivan buildings with NHL designation. (Note: The firm's Auditorium Building, Wainwright Building, and James Charnley House are also designated as NHLs. Other National Historic Landmarks designed by Sullivan alone include the Carson Pirie Scott Building, Bayard–Condict Building, Harold C. Bradley House, Farmers and Merchants Union Bank, Merchants' National Bank, National Farmers' Bank of Owatonna, People's Federal Savings and Loan Association, and Van Allen Building.) The NHL report described the Guaranty Building as one of "a large number of outstanding structures in the core of the city". The Guaranty Building was designated by the Buffalo Landmark and Preservation Board in 1976. Following a bid to preserve several buildings in Downtown Buffalo as local landmarks in the late 1970s, it was also added to the Joseph Ellicott Historic District, a local historic district. The Guaranty Building became a civil engineering landmark of the American Society of Civil Engineers in 1980. The designation commemorated the Guaranty Building's structural innovations, such as its use of spread footings and iron columns.

The Guaranty Building has been detailed in several exhibits of Sullivan's work. Shortly after its completion, drawings and photographs of the building were exhibited at the Portfolio Club in Indianapolis. Other exhibitions have included those at the Museum of Modern Art, Riverside City College, and the Octagon, along with a 1987 traveling show organized by the Chicago Historical Society. Frank Lloyd Wright's collection included sketches of the building's piers, which were displayed at New York City's Columbia University in 1966. Over 500 drawings from the Guaranty Building's construction remained extant and were exhibited in the building's Louis Sullivan Museum in the 1970s. The building was the subject of a 2010 documentary about Sullivan's work, and the terracotta decorations helped influence the design of an Art Nouveau chair created by Charles Rohlfs c. 1898.

== See also ==
- List of tallest buildings in Buffalo
- National Register of Historic Places listings in Buffalo, New York
- List of National Historic Landmarks in New York
