= Sullivan Center =

Commercial building in Chicago, Illinois

- Carson, Pirie, Scott and Company Store; Sullivan Center
- U.S. National Register of Historic Places
- U.S. National Historic Landmark
- U.S. Historic district – Contributing property
- Chicago Landmark
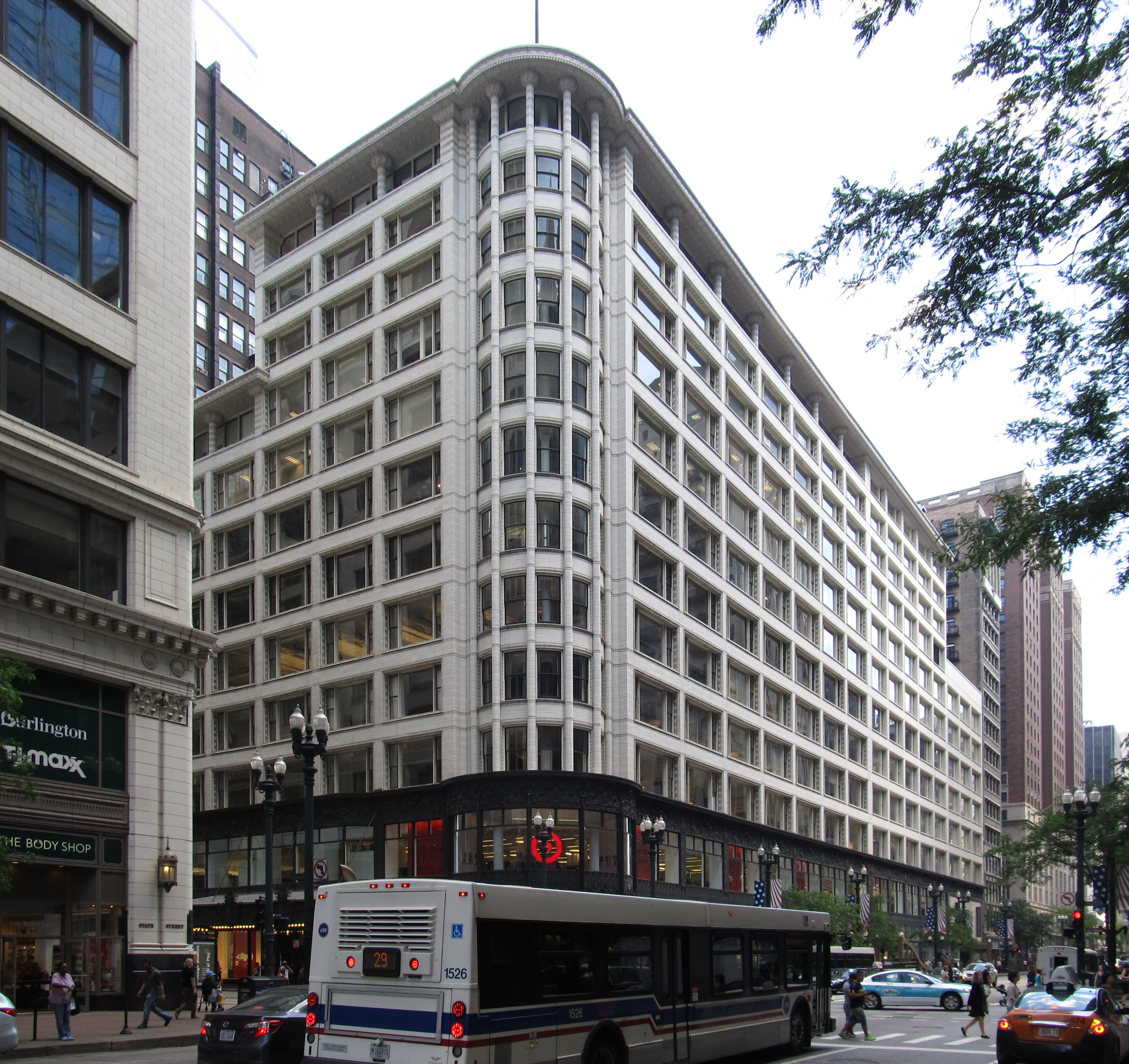

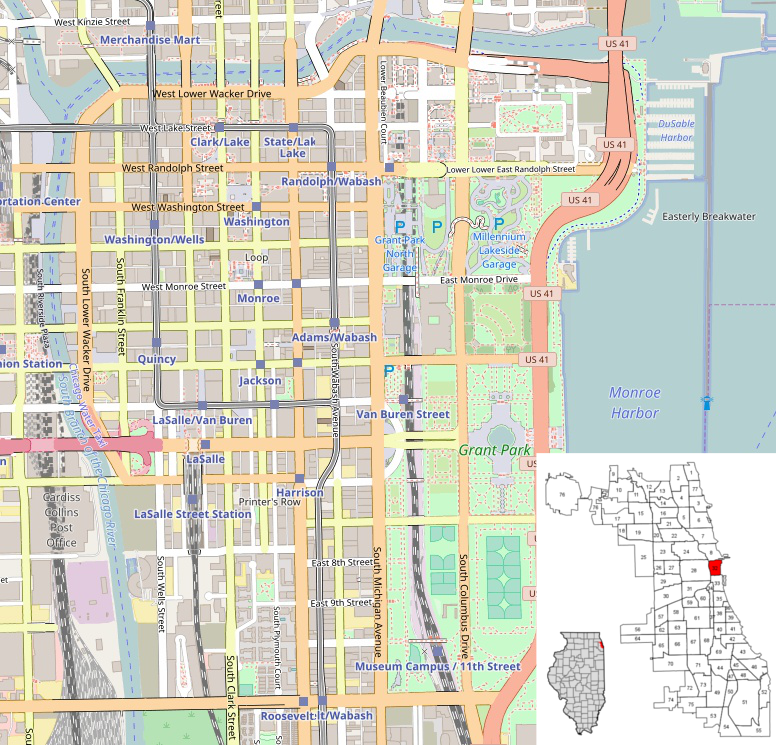
- Location within Chicago Loop Location within Chicago metropolitan area Location within Illinois Location within the United States
- Location: 1 South State Street, Chicago, Illinois, US
- Coordinates: 41°52′54″N 87°37′39″W
- Built: 1899, 1903, 1906–1907
- Architects: Louis Sullivan; D. H. Burnham & Company
- Architectural style: Chicago school
- Part of: Loop Retail Historic District (ID98001351)
- NRHP reference No.: 70000231

Significant dates
- Added to NRHP: April 17, 1970
- Designated NHL: May 15, 1975
- Designated CP: November 27, 1998
- Designated CHICL: November 5, 1970

Sullivan Center (formerly known as the Schlesinger & Mayer Building, Carson Pirie Scott Building, or Carson, Pirie, Scott and Company Store) is a 12-story building at State and Madison streets in Chicago, Illinois, United States. Opened in phases between 1899 and 1907, the building was designed by Louis Sullivan, originally for retail firm Schlesinger & Mayer, and was Sullivan's last large commercial building. For much of the 20th century, it housed the flagship store of Carson Pirie Scott (Carson's), which also occupied other properties on the same block. The building is a Chicago Landmark and National Historic Landmark and is part of the Loop Retail Historic District.

Schlesinger & Mayer previously occupied the Bowen Building on the same site and expanded it gradually during the 1880s and early 1890s. They originally commissioned Sullivan in the 1890s to expand the existing building before hiring him to complete a new structure. Sullivan oversaw both the original 1899 building and a 1903 annex. The building was sold in 1904 to H. G. Selfridge & Co., who sold the building to Otto Young and leased it to Carson's. Subsequent additions were completed by D. H. Burnham & Company in 1906–1907 and Holabird & Root in 1961. Carson's occupied the store until 2006, during which it gradually acquired both the building and the site. Following renovations in the late 2000s, it became Sullivan Center, an office complex.

The main elevations of the building's facade, on State and Madison streets, are connected by a curved corner. On each elevation, piers divide the facade into bays with wide Chicago windows. The lowest two stories are clad with decorative cast iron, with an entrance at the corner and large windows on either elevation. The windows on the upper stories are framed by white terracotta bands. The foundation includes a mixture of caissons and pilings, while the superstructure consists of cast iron and steel columns, which support terracotta floor slabs. The store's interior layout was arranged to maximize selling space, with open plan spaces between the columns. Sullivan Center was Sullivan's last major commercial design. It has been praised over the years for its engineering and architecture, despite mixed views of the exterior design details.

== Site ==
Sullivan Center, a.k.a. the Carson Pirie Scott Building, is located at 1 South State Street at the southeast corner of East Madison Street in the Loop section of downtown Chicago, Illinois, United States. It is part of a larger complex once operated by Carson, Pirie and Scott (colloquially Carson's), which occupied much of the city block bounded by State Street to the west, Madison Street to the north, Wabash Avenue to the east, and Monroe Street to the south. An alley runs from Madison to Monroe streets. Adjoining the building above Wabash Avenue is the Chicago "L"'s elevated Loop. The Chicago Building and One South Dearborn are immediately across State Street to the west, and the Haskell-Barker-Atwater Buildings and Silversmith Hotel are on the same block to the east.

The intersection of Madison and State streets is the zero-point baseline for the city's address grid system and dates from the original 1830s plat of Chicago. Because of this, both streets were misaligned where they crossed each other; this influenced the design of the Bowen Building, the previous building on the site.

=== Previous building ===
State Street's commercial strip was leveled during the Chicago Fire of 1871 and then rebuilt. Among the structures built after the fire was the Bowen Building at the southwest corner of State and Madison, designed by William Boyington and completed in 1872. This building originally housed clothing firm Clement, Morton & Co. (Note: Menocal 1981, p. 168, cites Schlesinger & Mayer (the Sullivan Center's original tenant) as having occupied the Bowen Building in 1873, but this is contradicted by contemporary sources.) That company leased the Bowen Building for five years but moved to another building in 1875 before the lease had expired. The next occupant, the Wilson Sewing Machine Company, moved into the building in 1876. The third occupant was Schlesinger & Meyer, a dry-goods store, which opened in April 1881. The land itself was acquired by Levi Z. Leiter in 1878 and leased to the building's successive owners under a leasehold agreement.

The Bowen Building originally measured six stories high and 60 by 80 feet (18 by 24 m) across, with the wider frontage on Madison Street. The misalignment of State and Madison streets had created a "prominent projection" at their southeast corner; Boyington took advantage of this by adding a rounded pavilion at the corner. The corner pavilion was topped by a circular dome with dormers, while the rest of the building had a mansard roof. Cornices ran across the facade, splitting it into two tiers of double-height columns and pilasters. Inside, the building had steam heat and elevators, both technologically advanced for the time. Adjoining it were several buildings of different heights.

== Development ==
=== Background ===
The idea for Sullivan Center arose following repeated expansions of the Bowen Building, whose final tenant, Schlesinger & Mayer, was operated by Leopold Schlesinger and David Mayer. Both German immigrants to the US, they had met while working together prior to the Chicago Fire. The company was founded in 1872 and occupied a space covering 2,500 square feet (230 m^{2}). Schlesinger in particular had become familiar with the work of Adler & Sullivan, the architectural partnership of Dankmar Adler and Louis Sullivan, in the 1880s, and he hired them to design his house on Michigan Avenue in 1884. Schlesinger & Mayer quintupled the Bowen Building's area from 32,000 to 160,000 square feet (3,000 to 14,900 m^{2}) between 1881 and 1895 by leasing and remodeling space in adjacent buildings.

==== 1881–1895: Early leases and expansions ====
In 1885, Schlesinger & Mayer leased 133–135 State Street immediately south of the Bowen Building, (Note: The building was leased in June 1885, but other sources give a conflicting date of 1886 for this lease.) which gave the company a total of 60,000 square feet (5,600 m^{2}). Leiter attempted to evict the firm that year because of a dispute over the ground-lease payments. Schlesinger & Mayer ended up buying the building (but not the land) in 1886, and a judge ruled against Leiter in 1889. Adler & Sullivan were hired in 1890 to replace the Bowen Building's mansard roof and dome with two additional stories. Sullivan was asked to redesign three bays, with the rest to follow if Schlesinger & Mayer liked his work. That February, Schlesinger & Mayer leased two properties south of the existing store, at 137–139 State Street. A boiler plant was added in conjunction with this annex. Two additional buildings at 141–143 State Street were acquired in 1891, increasing the frontage there to 200 feet (61 m). (Note: Siry 1988, p. 69, gives an alternate figure of 180 feet (55 m) for the State Street frontage. However, the Chicago Daily Tribune divides the 200-foot frontage as follows: 60 feet (18 m) for the corner building, 40 feet (12 m) for 133–135 State, and 50 feet (15 m) for 137–139 and 141–143 State.) The four State Street properties formed an L-shaped assemblage, as the newly leased lots at 137–143 State extended 160 feet (49 m) eastward from State Street, while the two buildings to the north extended only 80 feet (24 m) eastward.

Approximate boundaries of Schlesinger & Mayer's store following the leases in 1886–1891

After leasing 141–143 State, Schlesinger & Mayer wanted Adler & Sullivan to remodel the State Street buildings as a single structure with a unified facade; sources disagree on whether the enlarged building was to be six or eight stories high. Minimal interior modifications were needed because the floor levels of all four buildings were at the same heights. The renovations would have included an elaborate entrance on State Street, plans for which were announced in 1892. No action was taken for several years, during which Adler and Sullivan dissolved their partnership, forcing Schlesinger & Mayer to pick between the two men. Schlesinger & Mayer ultimately hired Sullivan because of his reputation designing artistic buildings. Frank Lloyd Wright, a onetime draftsman at Adler & Sullivan, later said that most of their clients had instead stayed with Adler.

==== 1896–1897 expansion ====
Growth of the Schlesinger & Mayer store before 1897
Year	Total sq ft	Total sq m
1881	32,000	3,000
1885	60,000	6,000
1892	120,000	11,000
1895	160,000	15,000
1897	300,000	28,000

Schlesinger & Mayer's site on State Street was among the most valuable in Chicago by the early 1890s. One block east, the Union Elevated Railroad (later part of the Chicago "L") was constructing its Loop above Wabash Avenue. Several retailers on State Street had acquired land on Wabash Avenue to cater to the riders who were expected to use the elevated. Other retailers nearby—who, like Schlesinger & Mayer, leased the land under their buildings and had high ground-lease payments—were rebuilding their stores to attract customers.

In May 1896, Schlesinger & Mayer signed a 99-year lease for two lots on Wabash Avenue owned by the Barker family. The next month, the company signed another 99-year lease with Frederick T. Haskell for two adjacent sites to the south, giving it an 80-by-171-foot (24 by 52 m) assemblage at 141–147 Wabash Avenue. Schlesinger & Mayer commissioned Sullivan to design a ten-story steel structure. The company set a $100,000 budget for the building, (Note: Equivalent to $3.3 million in 2025) which was to be connected by a footbridge to its existing State Street buildings. Work on the Barker site at 141–143 Wabash was underway by August 1896, in anticipation of a September opening. The existing four-story structure was to be remodeled, forming the base of the ten-story building, but only the lowest two floors were ultimately renovated. Schlesinger & Mayer also negotiated to lease two stories in an adjacent building at 135–139 Wabash. The Haskell lease at 145–147 Wabash was not finalized until early 1897.

Sullivan expanded 137–143 State to six stories in 1896, following the original early-1890s plans for these sites. This renovation included an elaborate French cafe. After these modifications were completed in 1897, the building measured eight bays wide on State Street and four on Madison Street, in addition to the Wabash Avenue property. Sullivan also designed a pedestrian bridge connecting 141–143 Wabash's second floor to the elevated Loop's brand-new Madison/Wabash station. Schlesinger & Mayer and Union Elevated agreed to the footbridge in May 1897, but just as the bridge was being completed, the city halted work on November 20. Overnight, 200 workers secretly completed the bridge, which opened the next day. The bridge had elaborate metalwork, steel girders, and glass walls and was similar in design to an overpass in Paris, but was later removed. Schlesinger & Mayer leased 145 State Street from Burley & Co. in 1897, adding 30 feet (9.1 m) to the State Street frontage south of the existing lots. This lease did not take effect until May 1900 when the existing tenants moved out.

=== New building ===
The rest of Schlesinger & Mayer's original plans, including the 10-story building on Wabash Avenue, were never carried out. The new storefront at 141–143 Wabash was the only pre-1898 design that survived the store's redevelopment over the next decade. The Lansing Journal later said that Schlesinger & Mayer's central location had attracted so many customers, "a mammoth new store has become necessary for their business".

Development
Year	Architect	Phase	Refs
1898	Louis Sullivan	First phase – Eastern 3 bays on Madison Street adjoining Bowen Building	
1903	Louis Sullivan	Second phase – Main section (western 3 bays on Madison Street, northern 7 bays on State Street)	
1906	D. H. Burnham & Company	Third phase – Southern 5 bays on State Street added to new building	

==== First phase ====
In early 1898, Leiter gave Schlesinger & Mayer a 99-year ground lease on the Bowen Building property for $11.088 million, a record for any property in Chicago. (Note: Equivalent to $365.8 million in 2025) The lease mandated the complete redevelopment of the site within ten years and that any new building cost at least $600,000. (Note: Equivalent to $19.8 million in 2025) Schlesinger & Mayer also bought multiple adjacent buildings, including the properties already leased by the store, for the new project. Sullivan drew up two designs, rising 10 and 12 stories but otherwise identical, with elaborate bronze storefronts on the lowest two stories and a white marble facade above. That May, news media reported that the 12-story design would be built for $1 million, (Note: Equivalent to $33.0 million in 2025) while sketches in the Chicago Daily Tribune showed the 10-story plan. Contrasting with Sullivan's previous rectangular work, the building was to contain a rounded corner at State and Madison, evoking the Bowen Building's old curve; the curve was shaped as an octagon at its base. The plans, exhibited at the Chicago Architectural Club that year, were so extravagant that they elicited skepticism.

Leiter sold the Bowen Building site that July to Marshall Field's department store, operated by Leiter's former business partner Marshall Field. By then, Schlesinger & Mayer had hired Adler to design the store's electrical plant, disregarding the possibility of conflict with Sullivan. After a period of vacillation regarding the building's size, Schlesinger & Mayer decided to erect the building in phases, starting with property on Madison Street. The company also directed Sullivan to shorten the building to nine floors. It received a construction permit for the first phase on Madison Street in November 1898, covering a 140-by-182-foot (43 by 55 m) site. The first phase occupied only part of its lot, measuring three bays wide; this allowed the existing Bowen Building and its annexes to remain open temporarily. Sullivan had completed his working drawings by the end of December, by which point work was to begin in early 1899. Continued confusion arose when Schlesinger & Mayer's indecision over the building's height, which was ultimately finalized at nine stories to comply with Chicago's 130-foot (40 m) height limit.

The plans were finalized in April 1899; the building was downsized because Schlesinger & Mayer had not acquired as much land as expected. This revised plan was to cost $600,000. (Note: Equivalent to $19.6 million in 2025) Land clearing at 50–56 Madison Street began on May 1, and the firm simultaneously leased temporary space at 133–139 Wabash. That July, Schlesinger & Mayer paid the Chicago government $500 for permission to protrude the storefront bay outward. (Note: Equivalent to $16,000 in 2025) Work on the new building was rushed to minimize lost profits; by October, the new building's first phase had topped out. The first phase was open at the end of the year, having cost over $330,000. (Note: Equivalent to $10.8 million in 2025) By then, the site was among the highest-valued in Chicago, at $159.68 per square foot ($1,718.8/m^{2}). (Note: Equivalent to $5,214 per square foot ($56,124 per square meter) in 2025) The opening of the Schlesinger & Mayer Building's first phase coincided with the completion of two other Sullivan projects: the Gage Group Buildings and the Bayard–Condict Building.

==== Second phase ====
View from across Madison Street, showing the differing rooflines of the first (left) and second (right) phases

Eugene S. Pike, who owned the Bowen Building's leasehold, sued Schlesinger & Mayer in February 1900, claiming the firm was "ruining the building" by removing stairs, walls, elevators, and machinery. A judge placed an injunction restricting further renovations that April. Merchant Otto Young, who had acquired land immediately to the south at 145–153 State Street, announced the next year that Schlesinger & Mayer planned to develop a building there. Schlesinger & Mayer wished to resume construction after the Chicago City Council voted in March 1902 to increase height limits to 260 feet (79 m). The company sought to build a 280-foot-tall (85 m) tower but was unsuccessful in securing a further height increase.

Henry Siegel, the executive of Siegel, Cooper & Co., acquired Schlesinger's share of the company in June 1902 following months of negotiations. This acquisition increased Schlesinger & Mayer's assets to $6.5 million; at the time, the building's full construction cost was estimated at $1–2 million. (Note: Equivalent to $30.1–60.1 million in 2025) Siegel, Cooper & Co. decided to proceed with the second phase, and Schlesinger & Mayer took out a $3 million mortgage loan on the property in August. (Note: Equivalent to $90.2 million in 2025) Sullivan drew up drawings for an annex at the corner of State and Madison streets. The annex, covering 180 by 70 feet (55 by 21 m), was similar in design to the first phase but had 12 stories. Schlesinger & Mayer initially intended to also expand the first phase from 9 to 12 stories but learned that its foundations were too weak. The final design was nearly identical to Sullivan's original 1898 plans, except for the base and top three stories.

The George A. Fuller Company was hired as the general contractor for the second phase. In October, workers began constructing caissons for the second phase's foundation under the existing buildings, which remained in operation, to avoid interfering with the store's holiday window displays. Due to the constrained space, only six caissons were laid at a time. Two lifts were installed to extract debris, but to avoid turning away visitors, no supplies could be stored on the street. The foundations were completed in January 1903 and cost only about $8,000 (Note: Equivalent to $230,000 in 2025) more than comparable foundations built on empty sites. The Fuller Company was rehired for the second phase's superstructure. The northern section at the corner was to be built by May, followed by the southern section that October. Schlesinger & Mayer moved to the new building's first phase on Madison Street and the older buildings on State Street, which flanked the corner lot.

After the corner had been razed, work on the second phase's northern section began on January 15, 1903. Steelwork was being installed by January 25, and it took twelve days to construct the floor slabs. The corner section was finished on April 25 and opened on May 11. Land clearing for the second phase's southern section began in May, immediately after the northern section opened. The framework had been built by July. The next month, laborers went on strike to protest Fuller Construction's refusal to hire carpenters for the building's falsework; the strike ended after two weeks. The southern section opened on October 12, 1903, giving the building a frontage of 180 feet (55 m) on State and 145 feet (44 m) on State Street. Though the building had cost $1.65 million to date, (Note: Equivalent to $47.4 million in 2025) the interior was still incomplete. The second phase's construction had caused $300,000 in lost revenue between January and May 1903 alone. (Note: Equivalent to $47.4 million in 2025) Sullivan also redesigned the Wabash Avenue buildings that year. When the second phase opened, Schlesinger & Mayer gave tours of the mechanical system.

==== Ownership changes ====
Detail of the entrance

Meanwhile, Schlesinger & Mayer's monetary shortfalls had prompted Mayer to seek further land for expansion, as well as more radical ideas such as merging with rival department store Carson Pirie Scott (colloquially Carson's). The company had leased 155 State Street from Adolf Kraus in August 1903 and it leased the adjacent Columbus Club property on Monroe Street, the next month. The company, needing to expand its offices quickly, evicted a jeweler who had been subleasing 145 State. The firm unsuccessfully attempted to buy Young's lease at 145–153 State, which separated the new building from the Columbus Club and 155 State. By early 1904, Mayer no longer wanted to acquire additional land and was looking to sell the building and leaseholds.

Department store operator Harry Selfridge bought the new building, the leaseholds, and all of Schlesinger & Mayer's other assets in May 1904. He paid $5 million, far more than what equivalent real estate across State Street would have cost. (Note: Equivalent to $139.9 million in 2025) The building became a Selfridge & Co. store that June, and Selfridge sold the building to Young that month for $1.485 million, occupying it under a leaseback agreement. (Note: Equivalent to $41.5 million in 2025) Field continued to own the land. Selfridge was unable to obtain 145–153 State, and the leases of 155 State and the Columbus Club also fell through.

After eight weeks of ownership, Selfridge sold the building's lease and the store's assets to Carson's that August for a net profit of $400,000. (Note: Equivalent to $111.9 million in 2025) The lease on Carson's previous flagship store at the Reliance Building was about to expire, influencing its decision to buy Selfridge's building. Carson's agreed to pay Young $196,000 annually for the building, which was renamed the Carson Pirie Scott Building. (Note: Equivalent to $5.5 million in 2025) The company relocated there on September 19, 1904; it was the final relocation for Carson's Chicago flagship, which had moved nearly a dozen times in a half-century of business.

==== Third phase ====
Soon after acquiring the building, Carson's sought to expand it southward, but it did not hire Sullivan for unknown reasons. D. H. Burnham & Company—the architectural firm of Daniel Burnham, who had designed the Reliance Building—was hired to design the third phase of the Carson Pirie Scott Building. The annex, measuring five bays wide, was to be built at 145–153 State. Carson's subleased the site from Young in January 1905, paying $346,000 annually. (Note: Equivalent to $9.6 million in 2025) Carson's and Young agreed to construct a 12-story building with foundations strong enough for 18 stories, continuing the exterior design of the first two phases. Construction was to be postponed until the next year, and several months elapsed before Burnham began working on the design. That August, the city government notified Carson's that the curved corner entrance protruded onto the street and was likely subject to rent payments.

Field died in January 1906, bequeathing his land to the Field Museum of Natural History. Shortly afterward, Burnham & Co. subcontracted the masonry and foundation work to Thompson–Starrett Company. Carson's received a construction permit for the annex in mid-April, and demolition work began on May 1. At the time, the annex had an estimated cost of $850,000. (Note: Equivalent to $22.8 million in 2025) Young died that year, but his will precluded the trustees of his estate from selling the building until at least ten years after the death of his daughter Julia. Under his will, rental income from the building went to his daughters. The original Carson Pirie Scott Building's third and final phase ultimately opened in October 1907, providing additional space for men's, women's, and children's clothing departments.

== Operational history ==
=== 20th century ===
==== Late 1900s to late 1920s: Expansion ====
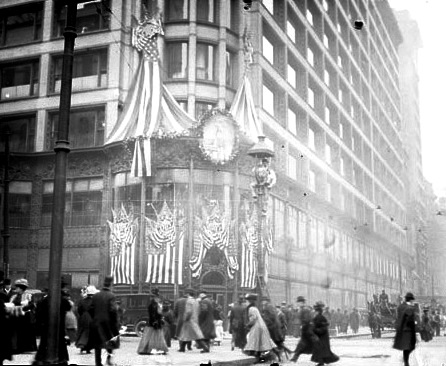
Decorations to celebrate Abraham Lincoln's 100th Birthday in 1909

Initially, Carson's used its storefront windows for elaborate displays. The city government directed Carson's to remove protruding signage from the Madison Street facade in 1909 as part of a signage ban along that street. In 1912, the Crozer family—the legal owner of the lots at 145–153 State, by then renamed 25–29 South State Street—sold these parcels to the Field estate.

In 1922, Carson's bought the Thomas Church Building at 32–34 South Wabash Avenue, adjoining its existing Wabash Avenue frontage. Carson's obtained the Mentor Building at State and Monroe two years later. This gave the company full control of State Street's eastern frontage between Madison and Monroe streets. Following these land acquisitions, Carson's contemplated expanding the existing building farther south. Concurrently, Burnham & Co. was erecting the Wabash Monroe Building, at the northwest corner of Wabash Avenue and Monroe Street on the same block, for another developer. The company leased several floors in the Wabash Monroe Building for its men's store in late 1926. At the time, several of Carson's competitors had men's departments facing Wabash Avenue, while Carson's men's store still occupied the building on State Street. Carson's had leased the entirety of the Wabash Monroe Building by that December, and it also evicted the Church Building's tenants to provide space for the men's store.

The men's store moved to the Wabash Monroe Building in July 1927. Carson's also moved several other departments to the new building, allowing the company to renovate the older building. The main entrance was relocated southward, away from the curved corner. The interior was reconfigured to provide wider aisles. Several existing departments were enlarged, and new counters were built around existing columns to take advantage of the open-plan interiors. A footbridge was built to connect the shoe departments in the Carson Pirie Scott and Wabash Monroe buildings. Carson's postponed its plans for a southward expansion of the original building, instead leasing out the Mentor Building.

==== Early 1930s to early 1950s ====
Carson's had acquired two further plots on Wabash Avenue by 1930, connecting the interiors of these buildings and remodeling their storefronts. By then, the original Carson Pirie Scott Building on State Street and the store's Wabash Avenue expansions, which were offset from each other, covered much of the block. In 1935, Carson's announced plans to spend $1.25–1.5 million on renovations, (Note: Equivalent to $23.1–27.7 million in 2025) including heating, air conditioning, and elevators. Escalators were also added, necessitating the rearrangement of interior spaces, including new diagonal aisles on the second floor. A plaque to World War I soldiers was dedicated at the building in 1938, and four budget-merchandise departments opened two years later. When the State Street subway was proposed in 1941, Carson's received permission to construct an entrance from the subway (between Washington and Monroe stations, which shared a continuous platform) to the original Carson Pirie Scott Building. The subway entrance opened in 1944.

By the mid-1940s, Carson's sought to expand its building, though World War II-era material restrictions prevented work from beginning immediately. Carson's received a permit in 1947 to expand into the north–south alley running midblock between Madison and Monroe streets. The next year, the facade decorations were removed from the top floors of Sullivan's sections. Carson's also announced plans for another building on Monroe Street, consisting of modifications to an existing 10-story building there. The Monroe expansion opened in 1950. The downtown Chicago buildings were Carson's only store location until 1952, when the company opened its first branch. Carson's leased space in the building to Childs & Wood for an insurance bureau the next year. By then, the original building was known as the North State Street Building.

==== Mid-1950s to late 1960s: Further expansion ====
Seen from street level

In 1954, Carson's proposed buying the original building at State and Madison from Otto Young's estate for $6,321,503, (Note: Equivalent to $59.2 million in 2025) but the trustees could not sell the building without court permission because Julia Young was still alive. If acquisition were not possible and Young's trustees could not lower the rent, Carson's threatened to relocate. Carson's submitted an updated bid of $7.25 million in January 1955, (Note: Equivalent to $67.9 million in 2025) but federal judge Michael L. Igoe restarted the bidding process the next month. In response, Carson's proposed expanding the Wabash Avenue properties—forming an L shape around the original building—for $5 million. (Note: Equivalent to $46.8 million in 2025) Carson's also sought to sell the lease, which ran five more years. When a New York company offered $7.5 million for the building that July, Igoe withheld approval of the bid contingent on Carson's ability to match the order. (Note: Equivalent to $70.3 million in 2025) After Carson's agreed to pay that amount, Igoe gave Carson's the right to buy the building.

Carson's finalized its purchase in October 1955, paying about 25% of the cost in cash and taking out a mortgage for the remaining amount. The same year, Carson's announced plans to condense its selling areas, since it no longer needed to reserve space in the Wabash Avenue properties for a potential relocation. The top floors of the original building and the Wabash Monroe Building were converted to offices, and new air conditioning and escalators were added on the original building's lowest eight floors. The original decorations at the corner entrance, on State and Madison, were removed or concealed. The renovation program was half-complete by 1958, at which point sales departments had been consolidated in the basement through seventh stories; many of the departments had also been rearranged between different floors. The Heather House restaurant opened on the eighth floor in 1959. Despite Carson's rapid growth in the suburbs, its downtown store was still its primary operation.

By 1960, Carson's had acquired three buildings south of the Carson Pirie Scott Building, having leased the sites for several years. That July, Carson's announced plans to spend $2 million (Note: Equivalent to $16.7 million in 2025) on an eight-story annex south of the existing building, designed by Holabird & Root and spanning 59,500 square feet (5,530 m^{2}). The annex was one of several ongoing major expansions of department stores on State Street during that time. By then, the store occupied over 1 million square feet (93,000 m^{2}) on the block, but the company was considering leasing out space in its adjacent buildings. The annex was finished by 1961, (Note: Holabird & Root's addition is also cited as dating from 1960.) and O'Connor & Goldberg leased a shoe store on the annex's lower floors. Carson's also restored other parts of its existing structures and continued to seek additional property on the same block during the decade. Large parts of the Carson Pirie Scott Building were damaged by arson in 1968, causing $20 million in damage; (Note: Equivalent to $141.1 million in 2025) some departments reopened quickly, but the flagship store still lost money due to the fire.

==== 1970s to 1990s ====
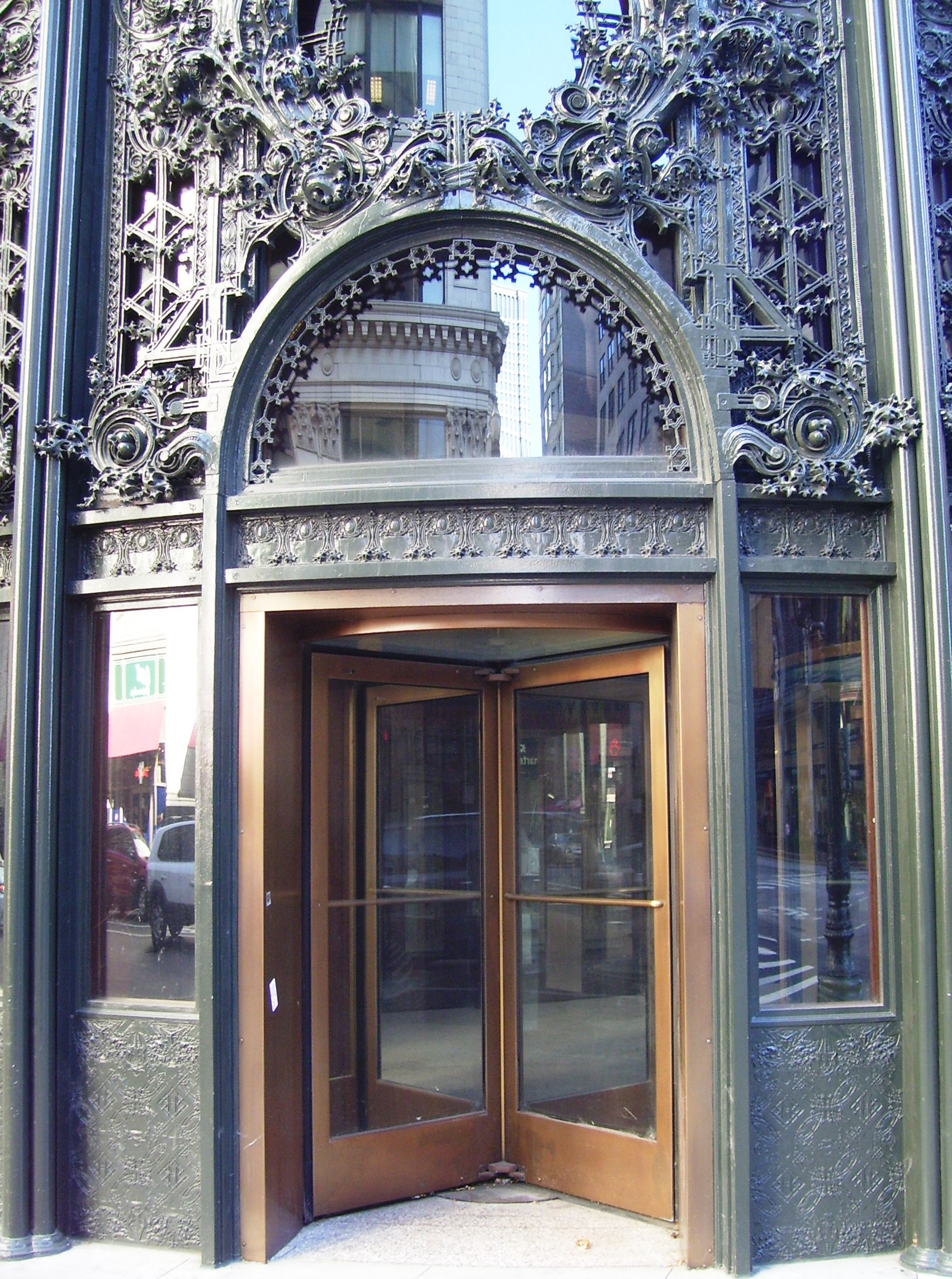
Revolving door at the main entrance

A Honey Bear Farm gourmet shop opened at the building in 1970. During that decade, the Field Museum still owned the site, with the United Methodist Church and the Northern Trust Company as co-owners. Carson's bought the Field Museum's section of the land in 1978 for $2 million, (Note: Equivalent to $7.7 million in 2025) gaining full control of the property. The land acquisition ensured that ownership of the building would not revert to the landowner when the leasehold expired. Concurrently, Carson's had announced plans in 1977 for a renovation of the building's first floor, part of a wider-ranging initiative to rehabilitate State Street. Architect John Vinci was hired to oversee the renovation, which involved cleaning the upper facade and repainting the base. The work also involved restoring the original ornamentation in the corner entrance's vestibule, which was rededicated in mid-1979.

The first floor was renovated in 1984. Carson's also spent $2–3 million (Note: Equivalent to $5.2–7.9 million in 2025) converting the basement into a Corporate Level store for women, which opened that August. The next year, Carson's divided the second floor into 30 small apparel shops, renovated the men's departments, and opened a Corporate Level men's store next to the women's store. Carson's evicted O'Connor & Goldberg from the State Street annex in 1986 to expand its own departments, and a grocery store opened at the building the following year. By the late 1980s, the site occupied a blighted portion of State Street, and many nearby upscale stores had moved to the Magnificent Mile on Michigan Avenue. Bergner's, which acquired Carson's in 1989, considered closing and redeveloping the Carson's flagship building.

The 1992 Chicago flood damaged equipment and closed the building for two weeks; by then, Bergner's owed $1.4 million in property taxes. (Note: Equivalent to $2.9 million in 2025) By 1994, the sixth floor was being renovated, and Bergner's (rebranded Carson's) was planning to remodel the first floor. At that point, the original interior design had been significantly altered, and the top five stories were being rented out. The restoration had been completed by the late 1990s. Afterward, Carson's proposed selling the building in 1998 to Joseph Freed and Associates, which agreed the next year to buy the building. Carson's also requested that the city provide tax increment financing (TIF) to help fund further restoration. The Chicago government approved $5.5 million in TIF funds for terracotta restoration (Note: Equivalent to $10.0 million in 2025) and agreed to buy out the remaining sites. Another $8 million was allocated for other aspects of the project. (Note: Equivalent to $14.5 million in 2025)

=== 21st century ===
==== 2000s: Initial renovations and Carson's closure ====
In late 2001, Freed Associates finalized its purchase for $19 million. Carson's occupied about 620,000 square feet (58,000 m^{2}) in the original Carson Pirie Scott Building and neighboring structures under a leaseback agreement, spanning the lowest seven stories. The upper stories of these structures were to be redeveloped as 400,000 square feet (37,000 m^{2}) of office space, rebranded as Sullivan Center. About half of the office space was to be renovated from existing space, while the remainder was to be new construction. The $50 million cost was to be funded primarily by Sherwin-Williams and the National City Bank of Cleveland, with some city and federal tax credits. A new lobby was created to serve the upper stories. GFRC of Lincoln, Nebraska, rebuilt the terracotta decorations on the top stories of Sullivan's two phases. During renovations in 2002, the roof caught fire. By the mid-2000s, most of the office space had been leased.

Bon-Ton Stores Inc. acquired the Carson's chain in late 2005. It considered downsizing the Chicago flagship, which was five to six times larger than the company's average store, or alternatively renovating the building. The first phase of renovations, including restoration and cleaning of the upper facade, was completed in 2006. That August, Bon-Ton announced that the flagship store would close early the next year, after Freed Associates bought out Bon-Ton's lease. By then, the store was losing money due to reduced visitation, but there was increasing demand for commercial and residential space in the Loop. The store closed in February 2007. Afterward, only a small restaurant remained in the building's retail space, and there were concerns that future tenants might not preserve the historical design details.

As part of the Sullivan Center project, Freed Associates wished to convert most of the former Carson's space into offices, retaining only 250,000 square feet (23,000 m^{2}) on the lowest two floors for retail uses. Freed Associates initially sought to lease the downsized retail space to grocer Fox & Obel and clothing store Billabong, both of which withdrew. Meanwhile, in late 2007 the city provided $9.5 million for ironwork restoration. During the renovation, workers uncovered pieces of a storefront Sullivan had designed during the 1903 modifications to the Wabash Avenue buildings. The Wabash Avenue facades were completed in 2009, followed by the original building's facade the next year. The ironwork restoration received a preservation award from Landmarks Illinois.

==== 2010s to present ====
The interior of the Target store

By the early 2010s, the renovation's cost had increased to $190 million. The renovation was financed by a loan from PNC Bank, which repeatedly extended the loan's due date during the 2008 financial crisis but refused to extend the loan after 2010. An effort to lease some retail space to City Winery was unsuccessful, while department store Target had expressed an interest in occupying other parts of the retail space. Target finalized a lease for 125,000 sq ft (11,600 m^{2}) in February 2011, and it sought permission to restore the lower floors and add its logo to the exterior. In February 2012, Freed Associates sold a 60% stake in the development to Winthrop Realty Trust and Elad Canada. Winthrop and Elan renovated the retail space for $4.4 million. The Target store opened that July and won an architectural preservation award from the American Institute of Architects. The Financial Times wrote that Sullivan Center was among "the most beautiful stores in the world [that] are now either empty or occupied by discount stores".

Sullivan Center and the neighboring structures were placed for sale in 2014 and sold to a joint venture led by Madison Capital in April 2016 for $257 million. The sale included a provision allowing the retail and office floors to be split up into different ownership condominiums; at the time, the buildings had tax credits that prohibited such an ownership split. That August, the Madison Capital joint venture sold the retail space to Acadia Realty Trust for $147 million. 601W Companies bought the office space in 2018 for $176 million, upon which the offices were nearly fully occupied. At the time, the School of the Art Institute of Chicago and Gensler were among the office tenants.

By 2022, the building had 70,000 square feet (6,500 m^{2}) of unoccupied office space; amid a decline in office occupancy rates, its owners had renovated some of the space to attract tenants. Tenants who moved in during the 2020s included the Chicago Community Trust.

== Architecture ==
Sullivan Center is an example of the Chicago school of architecture. The style is generally characterized by limited decoration, tripartite windows, steel frames, and masonry facades, though Sullivan Center has elaborate ornamentation. It was constructed in three phases: the first two by Louis Sullivan and the third by Daniel Burnham's D. H. Burnham & Company. George Grant Elmslie, Sullivan's colleague, is credited with much of the ornamental detail. Many of Elmslie's decorations have egg-and-dart moldings and other motifs of classical or Gothic origin, while others were variations of naturally occurring motifs. William Gray Purcell, one of Sullivan's young apprentices, also worked on some details. The ornamentation contrasted with that of earlier department stores, which were largely utilitarian. The building is among the relative few Sullivan works still standing in Chicago, as most of his designs there have been demolished over the years.

When Carson's was in existence, it occupied a number of other buildings on the same block, which were internally connected with the Carson Pirie Scott Building. These included the Thomas H. Church Building at 32–34 South Wabash Avenue, a 13-story building designed by Hill & Woltersdorf and built in 1903. Also connected was the Wabash Monroe Building, designed by Burnham & Co. and completed in 1927. Rising 16 stories, the Wabash Monroe Building continued the design of the Carson Pirie Scott Building. Holabird & Root's annex copies the exterior of Sullivan's and Burnham's original design but is only eight stories high.

=== Facade ===
The building is divided vertically into six bays on Madison Street to the north and twelve bays on State Street to the west. It is composed of two sections: a cast-iron base and a terracotta upper section; the upper section's top story differs in appearance from the rest of the facade, giving the appearance of a traditional tripartite facade. The first section of the building is nine stories high and is three bays wide on Madison Street. The rest of the original building is twelve stories high. The 12-story corner of Madison and State streets is curved, with an arc length of 55 feet (17 m). The width of the bays, 21 11/12 feet (6.7 m) between the centers of each column, was dictated in part by Carson's need for large display windows and expansive open plan spaces with few columns inside. Except at their respective top stories, Sullivan's and Burnham's phases are designed in the same way.

==== Base ====
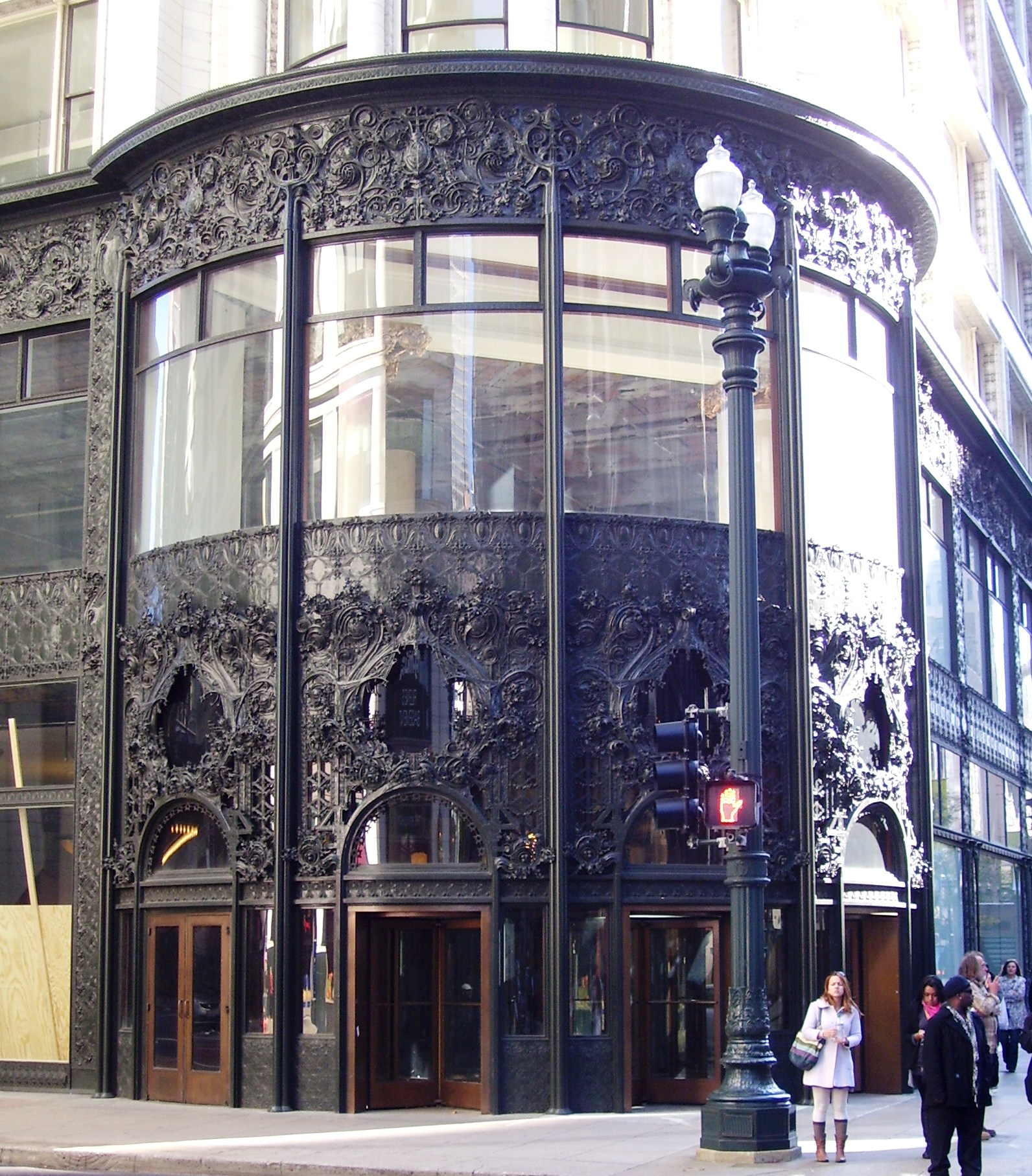
The corner entrance

Sullivan's early proposal called for the two-story base to be clad with bronze, but he ultimately used cast iron, a cheaper material. The cast iron is about 1/2 inch (13 mm) thick and was supposed to be electroplated for added durability. To save money, it was covered with asphaltum primer and green and red coats of paint, mixed to resemble a bronze patina; by the mid-20th century, it had been repainted gray. The cast iron was designed so that, seen from a certain angle, the natural lighting and shadows would give the appearance that the upper stories were floating. Kristian Schneider, who had previously produced ornament for other Sullivan buildings, made the plaster casts for Elmslie's designs. The decorations themselves were cast by Winslow Brothers, whose other works included the Rockefeller and Society for Savings buildings in Cleveland. After the lower stories became a Target store, the cast-iron facade was nicknamed the "Goth Target".

In Sullivan's original plans, the corner of State and Madison streets would have contained a polygonal display window, flanked by entrances on both streets. Ultimately, a circular entrance bay was built there, designed in a similar fashion to an entrance that Paul Sédille designed for the Printemps flagship store in Paris. Sullivan designed the corner entry to be seen from both streets, with elaborate ornamentation above it, such as wreaths above the doorways. The initials L.H.S., for the architect's full name Louis Henry Sullivan, are inscribed within the wreaths. The New York Times dubbed the wreaths "a sensational encrustation of cast iron ornamentation". On Madison Street, at the eastern end of that elevation, is a canopy overhanging another entrance. A third entrance exists at the southern end of the State Street elevation.

The display windows are surrounded by additional ironwork, which Sullivan considered "a garment of poetic imagery". The windows' ironwork was intended to frame the merchandise on display, attracting the attention of shoppers, who at the time were primarily women. To further entice shoppers, Sullivan wanted the display windows to protrude past the lot line onto the city-owned sidewalk, but since these incurred rental costs, later phases did not incorporate protruding windows. Both stories are topped by lintel panels. Behind each window were two display areas, which each measured 6–8 feet (1.8–2.4 m) deep. Prismatic glass panes above the window panes themselves reflected sunlight and, by extension, better illuminated the merchandise inside. Sullivan initially wanted the second-floor windows to be an open loggia but initially placed standard windows there.

==== Upper section ====
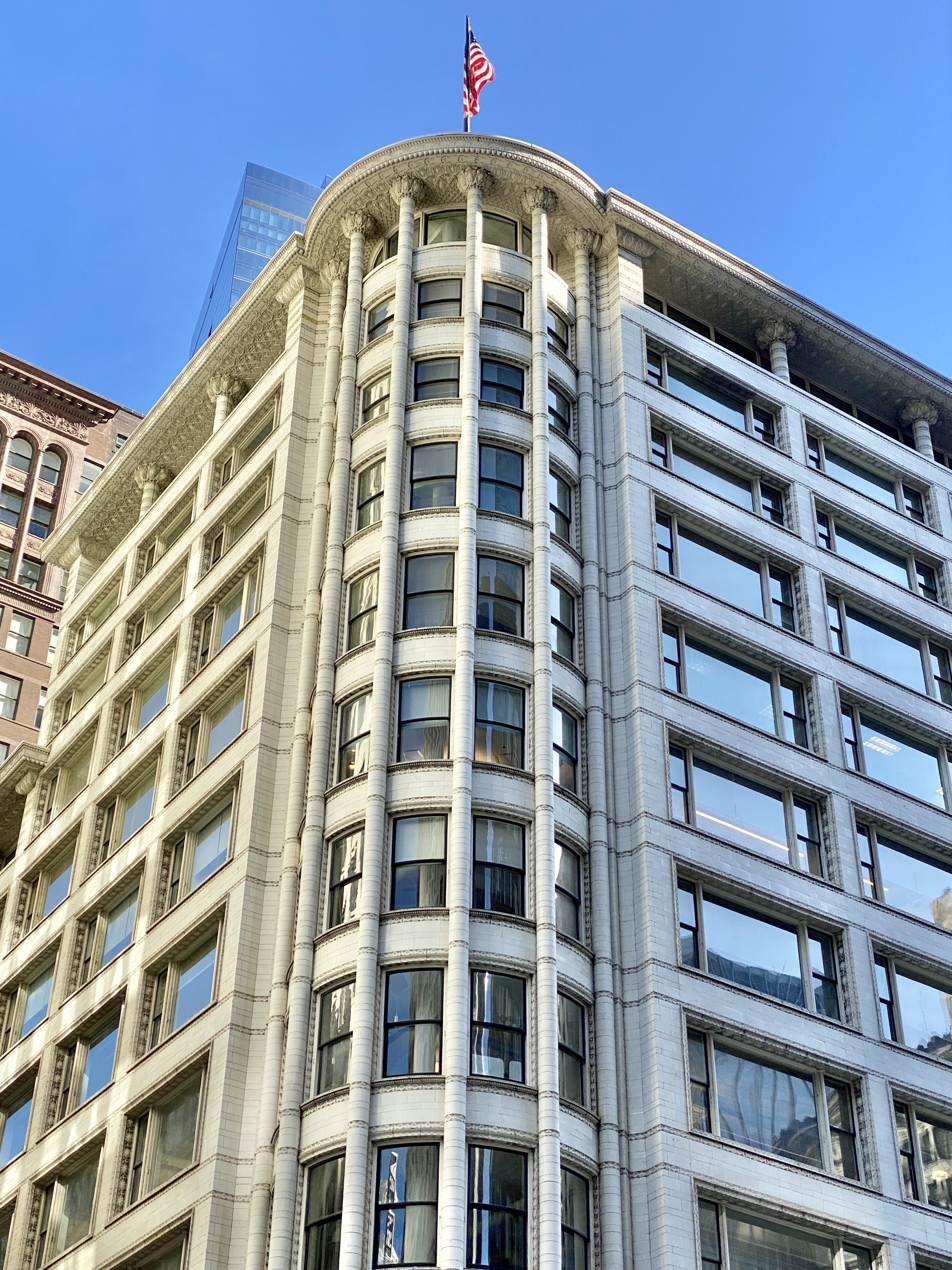
View of terracotta colonnettes at the corner, along with horizontal spandrels and vertical piers on either corners

Originally, Sullivan wanted the 3rd through 12th floors to be clad with white marble, cut to exacting dimensions and left exposed. Marble had been used in Schlesinger & Mayer's earlier building and other comparable department stores, and the material was selected for its fireproof quality and for its use in other classical buildings in the eastern US. As built, these floors are covered in terracotta tiles. Sullivan had used terracotta in his earlier high-rise buildings, and at the time of the first phase's construction, a stonecutters' strike made it difficult to obtain marble. Sullivan also reduced the heights of the 10th to 12th floors between his original and final plans.

The Northwestern Terra Cotta Company manufactured the terracotta tiles. Each tile measures about 2 feet (0.61 m) long, about one-tenth the width of each bay, and is laid in alternating thin and thick courses. Within the first section, the terracotta is clad with a matte finish to resemble natural stone, more specifically Sullivan's original conception for the marble. The terracotta tiles interlock, with gaps of less than 1/16 inch (1.6 mm) between each tile, and were smoothened prior to installation. The terracotta spandrels are laid horizontally, interrupting vertical piers. Sullivan wanted to place greater prominence upon the horizontal details, in contrast to his emphasis of vertical details on his earlier Guaranty and Wainwright buildings.

On the State and Madison elevations, the steel frame allowed Sullivan Center's windows to span the entire width of their bays. The windows consist of large plate glass sections flanked by smaller sash windows. This specific window layout later became known as the Chicago window. At the curved corner are narrow windows separated by protruding colonettes, which are closely spaced to create vertical emphasis. The windows between these colonnettes were originally curved windows that swung horizontally, later replaced with conventional double hung sash windows.

The respective top stories of Sullivan Center's first two phases (9th in the first phase, 12th in the second) have recessed windows between freestanding columns. This gave the appearance of an attic, contrasting with the spare decoration on the middle stories, and comported with Sullivan's belief that the top of a facade be decorated. Cornices protruded beyond the walls. The top stories' original decorations were removed in 1948 and were replicated in 2006, with new cornices made of fiberglass. The third phase, by Burnham, did not include a special facade treatment on the top story; all floors from the 3rd above were designed the same way.

=== Structural and mechanical features ===
The first section rests on 50-foot-deep (15 m) wooden piles. The second section rests on caissons; there are 56 or 59 caissons extending 60–80 feet (18–24 m) deep. Each caisson is placed within a 6-foot-wide (1.8 m) hole, lined with wooden lagging and iron rings, then filled with concrete and backfilled with sand. Sullivan later recalled that, although there had been soft clay immediately below ground level, workers had encountered a harder blue clay at a depth of 15 feet (4.6 m), which at greater depths required workers to wet the clay. The bottoms of the caissons were installed when workers reached shale.

Above ground level, the building's superstructure was akin to that of a skyscraper. The frame uses a post and lintel system, articulated in the vertical piers and horizontal spandrels of the facade. Cast iron was used for parts of the superstructure, even though such materials were going out of style by the 1900s. The superstructure of the first and second sections was planned with a steel frame. During the second phase of construction, the demand for rapid construction necessitated the use of cast iron columns, which could be readily fabricated, in the northern section at the corner. The second section's southern section was supported on Z-bar columns. For fireproofing, Sullivan surrounded the steel and cast-iron beams with terracotta. The third phase by Burnham has a cast iron superstructure. Cylindrical columns are used because, at the time, the prevailing architectural belief was that angles were more likely to weaken in a fire.

The floor slabs are constructed on segmental arches made of hollow terracotta. Ceilings, made of plaster and metal lath, are hung from the slabs above. The ceiling heights were influenced by practical considerations: When Sullivan Center was built, the lowest stories of multistory department stores could be reached without using elevators and were, as such, highly coveted. The ground story has the highest ceilings, up to 20 feet (6.1 m), and ceiling heights on the upper stories decrease to as low as 11 2/12 feet (3.4 m). (Note: The ceiling heights are: 1st floor: 20 ft (6.1 m); 2nd floor: 16 ft 3 in (4.95 m); 3rd floor: 14 ft 8 in (4.47 m); 4th to 9th floors: 13 ft 9 in (4.19 m); 10th to 11th floors: 11 ft 2 in (3.40 m); 12th floor: 12 ft 11 in (3.94 m))

From the outset, the building had a coal-fired power plant for the artificial light, which initially provided insufficient illumination, requiring Carson's to continue relying on natural light from the windows. The building's mechanical equipment also included a heating and ventilation plant in one basement and elevator equipment on the roof. Steam engines in the basement produced heat, which was distributed through radiator coils in the lower stories' floor slabs and radiators on the upper stories. As the windows could not be opened, this initially kept heat in during the summer, though air conditioning was added in the 1930s. The building also includes a fire suppression system, originally supplied from tanks on the roof, which incorporates exposed water pipes running below the ceilings.

=== Interior ===
Floor plan of the third story, facing east. The floor plan depicts only the original Sullivan Center building, not the adjacent buildings to the south or east.

The lowest stories span 100,000 square feet (9,300 m^{2}) and continue into adjacent buildings, while the upper stories are as small as 22,000 square feet (2,000 m^{2}). There are three basements. To maximize selling space, Sullivan designed a largely open plan space interrupted only by columns. This contrasted with earlier structures, where a single store extending into multiple buildings often was subdivided by party walls, thereby limiting sightlines. As another space-saving measure, the building lacked an open atrium, in contrast to older department stores such as Chicago's Marshall Field Building or New York's A. T. Stewart Building. Stairs and elevators for vertical circulation were relegated to the southern and eastern walls; the main staircases occupied the building's northeastern and southeastern corners. As built, there were two banks of elevators, set along the eastern wall of the selling space, between the main stairs.

The floor arrangement of Schlesinger & Mayer's departments was influenced by shopping patterns and to expedite inventory handling. Originally, merchandise was delivered from the eastern alley and stored on the top floors. Wide corridors were placed between different departments to comply with city building codes. Mahogany woodwork was used throughout the interior, and columns were topped by tapering plaster capitals. The elevators were encased in wrought-iron enclosures (later removed), and there were glass showcases. Stairs had elaborate grilles.

==== Interior layout ====
Originally, the first (uppermost) basement was part of the store's selling spaces. The main corner entrance, at State and Madison streets, leads to a vestibule (also known as the rotunda), originally separated into two sections. The vestibule has mosaic-tile floors, later divided by bronze strips. The vestibule's walls and ceiling have a mahogany veneer, and the vestibule is flanked by two columns; a cast-iron lamp is suspended from the ceiling between the columns. The rest of the first floor originally had small clothing items and jewelry, which Schlesinger & Mayer hoped would entice shoppers to go upstairs. The first floor had a 16-foot-wide (4.9 m) aisle, advertised as the widest in the city.

The second to seventh stories had departments with larger clothes items, along with more substantial product lines such as art, millinery, fabrics, carpets. There were elaborate ladies' parlors in the curved corner on the third and ninth stories. As built, the eighth floor was for dining and had a grill room with onyx pillars and mosaic floors; a kitchen occupied the south side of that floor. There was a dressmaking department on the ninth floor and offices on the top three floors. Holabird & Root's annex also has a 500-seat auditorium. Since the 2000s, only the lowest two floors have contained retail space, while the remaining space is used as offices.

== Impact and legacy ==
=== Reception ===
Sullivan Center's novel design received widespread notice in the architectural community. It has been described as one of the more architecturally significant structures to arise in Chicago after the 1871 fire. Architecture critic Blair Kamin wrote that "no State Street department store, not even Marshall Field's, is more important in the history of architecture", and architect Tammy Eagle Bull called it "one building every architectural student studies". The New York Times wrote that the building was "venerated like a shrine" among architects and preservationists.

==== Contemporary ====
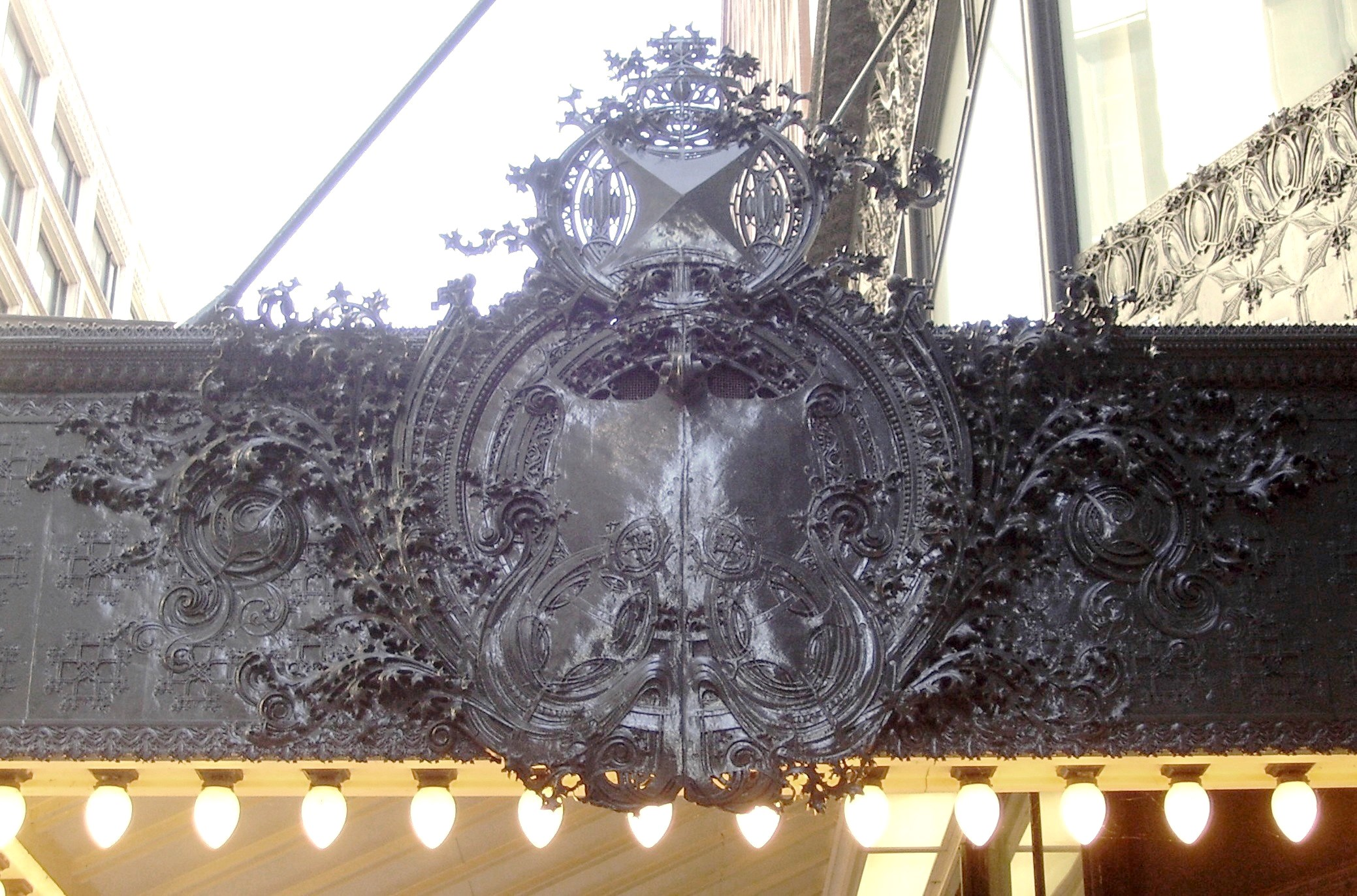
Several early critics deemed the base too elaborate for the building's function.

When the first phase on Madison Street was completed, it immediately drew contrasts with the older Bowen Building. Scholar Juan Pablo Bonta retrospectively wrote that contemporary critics had mixed perceptions of the decoration, which they felt was either well-suited or poorly integrated. Several early critics deemed the base too elaborate for the building's function. Bonta also wrote that observers disagreed on whether the building's facade was vertically or horizontally oriented, and that some critics (particularly those who had never physically visited the building) may have been unaware of the upper-story ornamentation.

In 1904, Henry W. Desmond of the Architectural Record wrote that Sullivan "has certainly evolved and elaborated a highly artistic form of superficial decorative expression in logical connection with the American steel skeleton building". Architecture critic Claude Bragdon wrote the next year that the Carson Pirie Scott Building extended upon the architectural technologies of Sullivan's earlier Wainwright and Guaranty buildings, calling Carson's "a crystal palace of glass and masonry, and iron overwrought". Dutch architect H. P. Berlage was particularly impressed by the Carson Pirie Scott Building when he toured Chicago in 1911, writing that it was "overloaded with ornament, but nevertheless it makes a quiet and distinguished impression". The next year, the Chicago Daily Tribune wrote that the building demonstrated "what beauty and symmetry may be achieved in a frank facade of iron, glass, and terra cotta".

The Carson Pirie Scott Building was less widely covered in American publications of the 1920s (particularly after Sullivan's death), and Sullivan himself never claimed it as a major work during his lifetime. An exception to the muted American reception was Lewis Mumford, who regarded Carson's as "more decisive in every way, it seems to be, than his skyscrapers".

==== Retrospective ====
The store continued to attract visiting architects in the mid-20th century. Bauhaus architect Walter Gropius, touring Chicago in 1938, claimed that "had the avant-garde in Europe known the Carson-Pirie-Scott Building, the evolution of modern architecture there might have been accelerated by fifteen years". Historian Sigfried Giedion similarly credited the Carson Pirie Scott Building as having improved upon earlier attempts to articulate a steel frame in a way that was both functional and decorative, backing his view with pictures of the middle stories in his 1941 book Space, Time and Architecture. Ludwig Hilberseimer, a colleague of Bauhaus architect Ludwig Mies van der Rohe, perceived the upper stories as having "a cleanliness and precision so nearly absolute that the most minute changes in proportions could be detected". In 1946, Architectural Review writer Henry Hope said that, although the large windows had long been admired, "many of us have been embarrassed by the highly ornate main entrance to the store". The Chicago Daily Tribune, in 1956, cited the Carson's and Auditorium buildings as Sullivan's two major accomplishments in Chicago. That year, a 1956 poll in Architectural Record magazine named the Carson's building one of the United States' most significant 19th-century commercial buildings, tied with Adler & Sullivan's Wainwright Building in St. Louis.

Historian Carl W. Condit, writing in 1964, called it "the ultimate achievement of the Chicago School and one of the great works of modern commercial architecture in the world". Condit viewed Frank Lloyd Wright's Larkin Administration Building as possibly Carson's only true rival among commercial buildings. In 1970, architecture critic Ada Louise Huxtable wrote that the building and the Chicago Stock Exchange's headquarters "still maintain a tremendous presence", akin to Italian Renaissance palazzi. During that decade, Country Life magazine called the decoration "incredibly luxuriant", on par with the European Art Nouveau movement, and a Critical Inquiry journal article described Sullivan Center as one of several late-19th-century Chicago buildings to demonstrate novel building technologies. United Press International called the building "possibly the most beautiful department store in the world", saying it contributed to the beauty of State Street's retail district. Paul Gapp regarded it as "the most familiar example of Sullivan's ornate work". Historians William Pierson Jr. and William Jordy wrote that, out of Sullivan's works, the Guaranty and Carson Pirie Scott buildings were most commonly upheld as examples of Sullivan's use of ornate ornament.

In the late 1980s, architectural historian Joseph Siry wrote that the building was "a monument characteristic of a place and time, as well as the work of a remarkable architect", though Building Design magazine perceived only the exterior as noteworthy. Historian Andrew Saint, writing in 1991, perceived the second floor's facade as more esthetic than functional, since it was seldom used for displays. During the 2000s, Sullivan biographer Hugh Morrison described Sullivan Center as "of equal significance with the Wainwright Building", despite their highly divergent appearances. The American Institute of Architects' 2007 List of America's Favorite Architecture ranked Sullivan Center 145th on a list of the top 150 buildings in the United States.

=== Architectural influence, media, and exhibits ===
Schlesinger & Mayer initially depicted the design of the building's windows in its advertisements.

Sullivan Center has been described as Sullivan's last skyscraper, coming a decade after the Wainwright Building in St. Louis, sometimes described as his first. It was also Sullivan's last major commercial design. Despite the building's prominence, Sullivan did not receive many commissions as a result, not even for the building's third phase, as he had relied on his partnership with Dankmar Adler to secure his largest commissions. Sullivan's most notable subsequent works were his jewel box banks in the Midwestern US. The building's architecture did inspire the design details of a nearby power plant. Sullivan Center is an early example of a superstructure that is articulated on its facade, a design choice popularized several decades later by mid-century modern architects. The building also inspired other architects such as Pritzker Architecture Prize winner Arata Isozaki.

When the building was being developed, Sullivan's associate Albert Francois Fleury drew renderings of it. Schlesinger & Mayer depicted the design of the building's windows in its advertisements. The Library of Congress collected photographs and construction drawings of the building, and Siry wrote a book in 1988 detailing Sullivan Center's development. Two panels from the building's original staircase are in the collection of the Mississippi Art Association.

=== Landmark designations ===
Chicago's Commission on Architectural Landmarks designated the Carson Pirie Scott Building as a landmark in 1958, citing the building's ornamentation and "serene horizontals of window and wall". The building was one of the commission's first five landmarks, along with the Auditorium, Rookery, and Monadnock buildings and Robie House. After the Commission on Chicago Landmarks replaced the Commission on Architectural Landmarks in 1968, Carson's supported redesignating the building as a landmark; the site owners opposed the designation, forcing the City Council to vote on the matter. The council redesignated the building in November 1970, making it the third designation under the new commission. The latter designation required that the city review any significant changes or proposed demolition.

The Carson Pirie Scott Building was added to the National Register of Historic Places (NRHP) on April 17, 1970. It was re-added to the NRHP as a National Historic Landmark (NHL) on May 15, 1975, for significance in the architectural field. The NHL designation includes only the original three phases west of the alley. The Carson Pirie Scott Building is one of several Adler & Sullivan buildings to be granted NHL designation. (Note: Adler & Sullivan's Auditorium Building, Wainwright Building, Guaranty Building, and James Charnley House are also designated as NHLs. Other National Historic Landmarks designed by Sullivan alone include the Bayard–Condict Building, Harold C. Bradley House, Farmers and Merchants Union Bank, Merchants' National Bank, National Farmers' Bank of Owatonna, People's Federal Savings and Loan Association, and Van Allen Building.) The original phases are a contributing property to the Loop Retail Historic District, added to the NRHP in 1998. In 2017, Sullivan Center and several other early skyscrapers in Chicago were identified as possible future nominees to UNESCO's World Heritage List under the name "Early Chicago Skyscrapers".

== See also ==
- List of National Historic Landmarks in Illinois
- National Register of Historic Places listings in Central Chicago
- Other National Historic Landmark department stores:
  - John Wanamaker Store
  - Macy's Herald Square
