= Chicago Building =

Building in Chicago, Illinois

- Chicago Savings Bank Building
- U.S. National Register of Historic Places
- Chicago Landmark
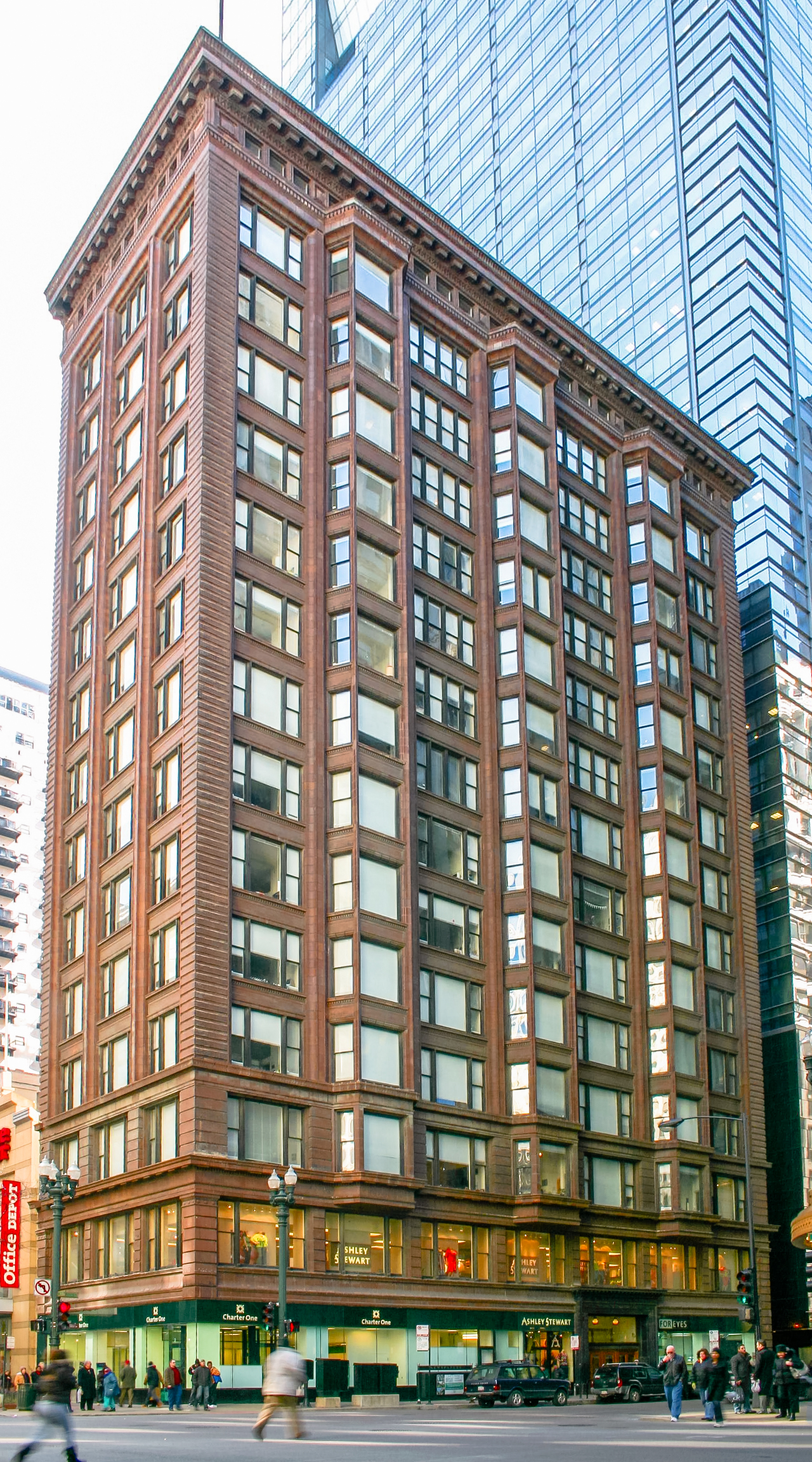
- Chicago Savings Bank Building

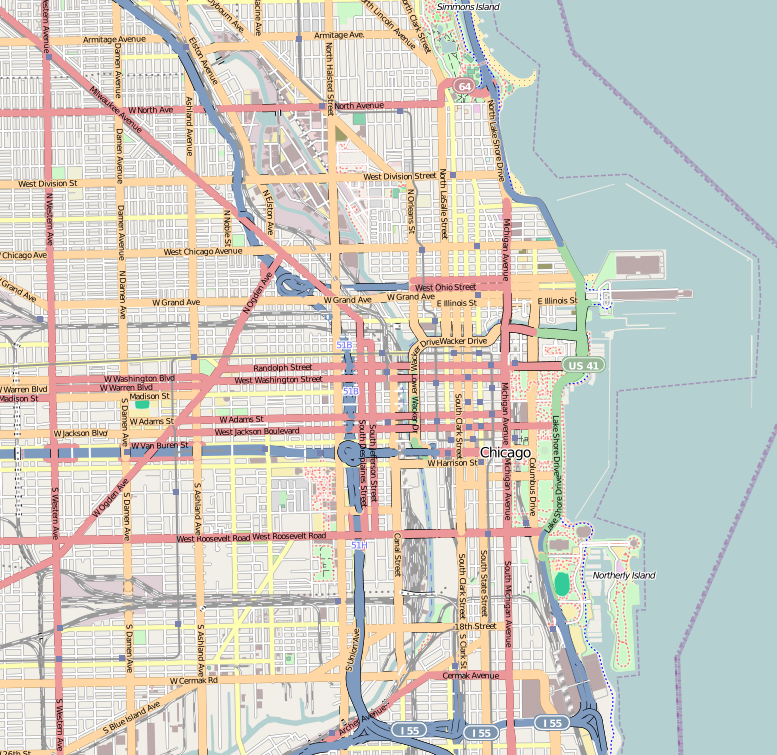
- Location within Central Chicago Location within Illinois Location within the United States
- Location: 7 W. Madison Street, Chicago, Illinois 60602
- Coordinates: 41.881826°N 87.628151°W
- Built: 1904–1905
- Architect: Holabird & Roche
- Architectural style: Chicago School
- NRHP reference No.: 75000645

Significant dates
- Added to NRHP: September 5, 1975
- Designated CHICL: March 26, 1996

The Chicago Building or Chicago Savings Bank Building is an early skyscraper, built in 1904–1905. It is located at 7 West Madison Street in Chicago. Designed by the architecture firm Holabird & Roche, it is an early and highly visible example of the Chicago school of architecture.

The building's features characterize this style through the use of large "Chicago windows", metal frame construction, distinctive bays, and terra cotta cladding. The combination of the north side projecting bay windows, and the east side rectangular "Chicago windows" with movable sashes is representative of the two typical Chicago school window types. The building is prominently located on the southwest corner of State Street and Madison Street; the two streets are misaligned at this intersection, increasing the building's visibility.

The building is a critical component of a grouping of significant structures, including Carson Pirie Scott and the former Mandel Brothers Store, at what was once labeled the "World's Busiest Corner". The building was designated a Chicago landmark on March 26, 1996. In 1997, it was converted to a dormitory for the School of the Art Institute of Chicago. The corner of the 3rd floor of the Chicago Building contains the cornerstone of Chicago. It is the 0-0 degree point of the city, and is the location from which all addresses in Chicago begin.

== See also ==
- National Register of Historic Places listings in Central Chicago
