= Northwestern Terra Cotta Company Building =

- U.S. National Register of Historic Places
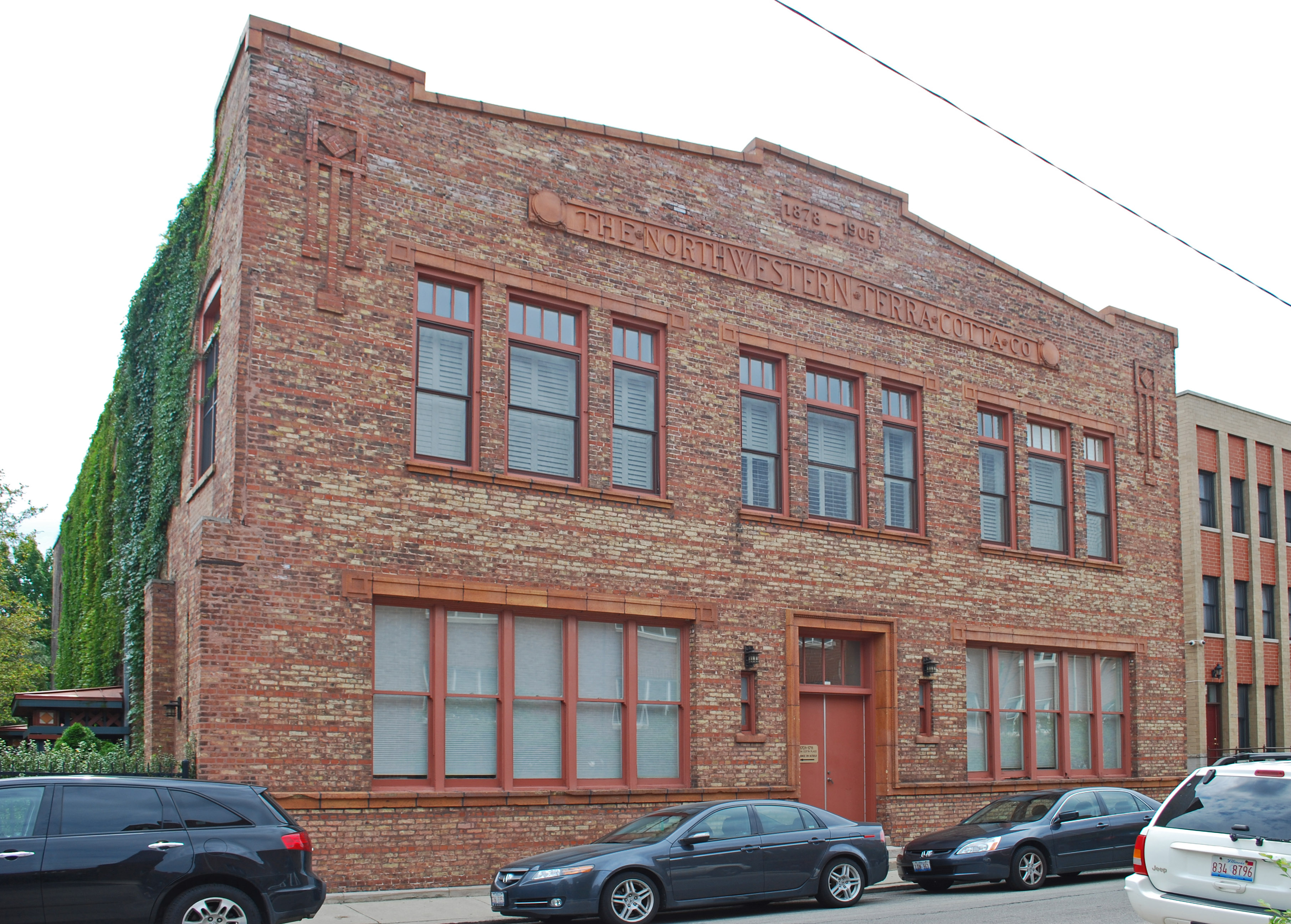

- Location within Chicago metropolitan area Location within Illinois Location within the United States
- Location: 1701-1711 W. Terra Cotta Pl., Chicago, Illinois
- Coordinates: 41°55′40″N 87°40′17″W
- Area: less than one acre
- Built: 1905
- NRHP reference No.: 88003245
- Added to NRHP: February 8, 1989

The Northwestern Terra Cotta Company Building is a historic building at 1701-1711 W. Terra Cotta Place in the Lincoln Park neighborhood of Chicago, Illinois. Constructed in 1905, the building housed the offices for the Northwestern Terra Cotta Company's terra cotta production plant.

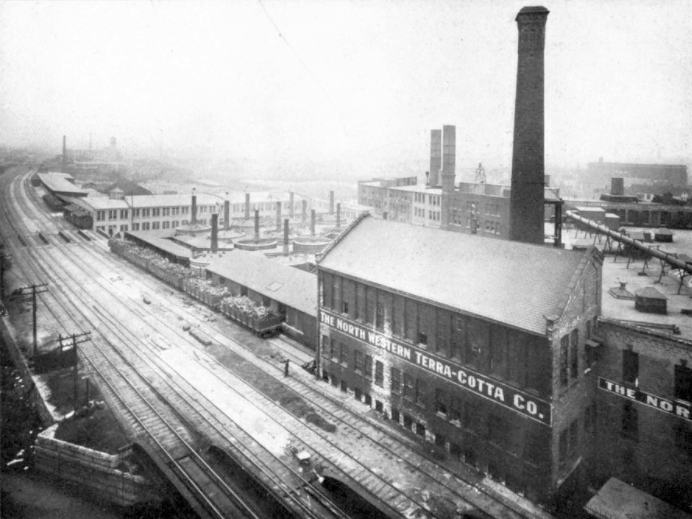
The plant c. 1905

In the early twentieth century, terra cotta was a popular decorative building material in both Chicago and the country as a whole; the newly developed Chicago school of architecture in particular used terra cotta extensively. The Northwestern Terra Cotta Company was one of the leading national producers of the material, and its terra cotta was used in Chicago architectural landmarks such as the Rookery Building, the Wrigley Building, and the Sullivan Center.

The plant closed in 1932 and has been largely demolished, leaving the office building as its only major remnant.

The building was added to the National Register of Historic Places on February 8, 1989.
