= Joseph Siry =

American architectural historian

Joseph M. Siry is a leading American architectural historian and professor in the Department of Art and Art History at Wesleyan University. Siry's publications have focused particularly on the architecture of Louis Sullivan, Frank Lloyd Wright and the Prairie School.

Siry received his education at Princeton University (B.A.), the University of Pennsylvania (M.Arch.), and the Massachusetts Institute of Technology (Ph.D.).

Siry's book, The Chicago Auditorium Building: Adler and Sullivan's Architecture and the City received the Alice Davis Hitchcock Award of the Society of Architectural Historians in 2003. He is a member of the Connecticut Academy of Arts and Sciences.

== Books ==
- Siry, Joseph M., Carson Pirie Scott: Louis Sullivan and the Chicago Department Store, University of Chicago Press, Chicago and London 1988, ISBN 0-226-76136-3
- Siry, Joseph M., The Chicago Auditorium Building: Adler and Sullivan's Architecture and the City, University of Chicago Press, Chicago and London 2002, ISBN 0-226-76133-9
- Siry, Joseph M., Unity Temple: Frank Lloyd Wright and Architecture for Liberal Religion, Cambridge University Press, London and New York 1998, ISBN 0-521-62991-8
- Siry, Joseph M., Beth Sholom Synagogue: Frank Lloyd Wright and Modern Religious Architecture, University of Chicago Press, Chicago and London 2012, ISBN 0-226-76140-1
