= Chicago window =

Type of large fixed glass panel

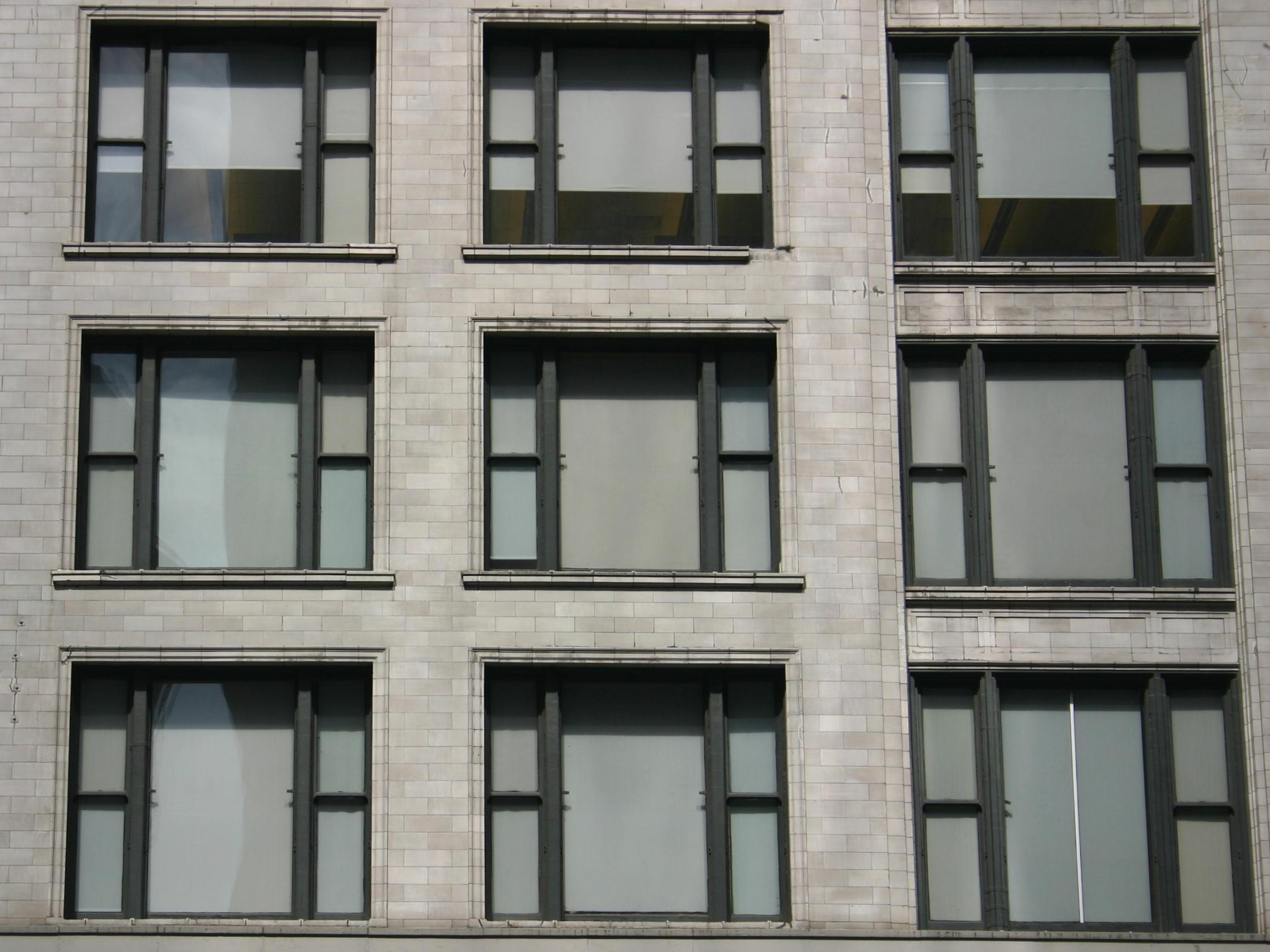
Chicago windows

A Chicago window is a large fixed glass panel flanked by two narrower sashes of the same height, filling a structural bay. The large pane is a single panel of plate glass, and the flanking elements are vertical double-hung sash windows with no dividing muntins. The fenestration was first used by architect William LeBaron Jenney in the 1884 Home Insurance Building, and immediately after by several of the Chicago School architecture firms such as Holabird and Root in their Marquette Building (Chicago), Daniel Burnham's Fisher Building (Chicago), and Louis Sullivan's Carson Pirie Scott department store. The window design was made possible by advances in glass-making technology and steel structural framing, and became a defining feature of the Chicago school style. The design offered both abundant natural light and practical ventilation. Projecting oriel bays are a common variant of the Chicago window, as seen here in the Reliance Building (1895) by Burnham and Root.
