= Chicago Stock Exchange Arch =

Preserved 19th-century building fragment

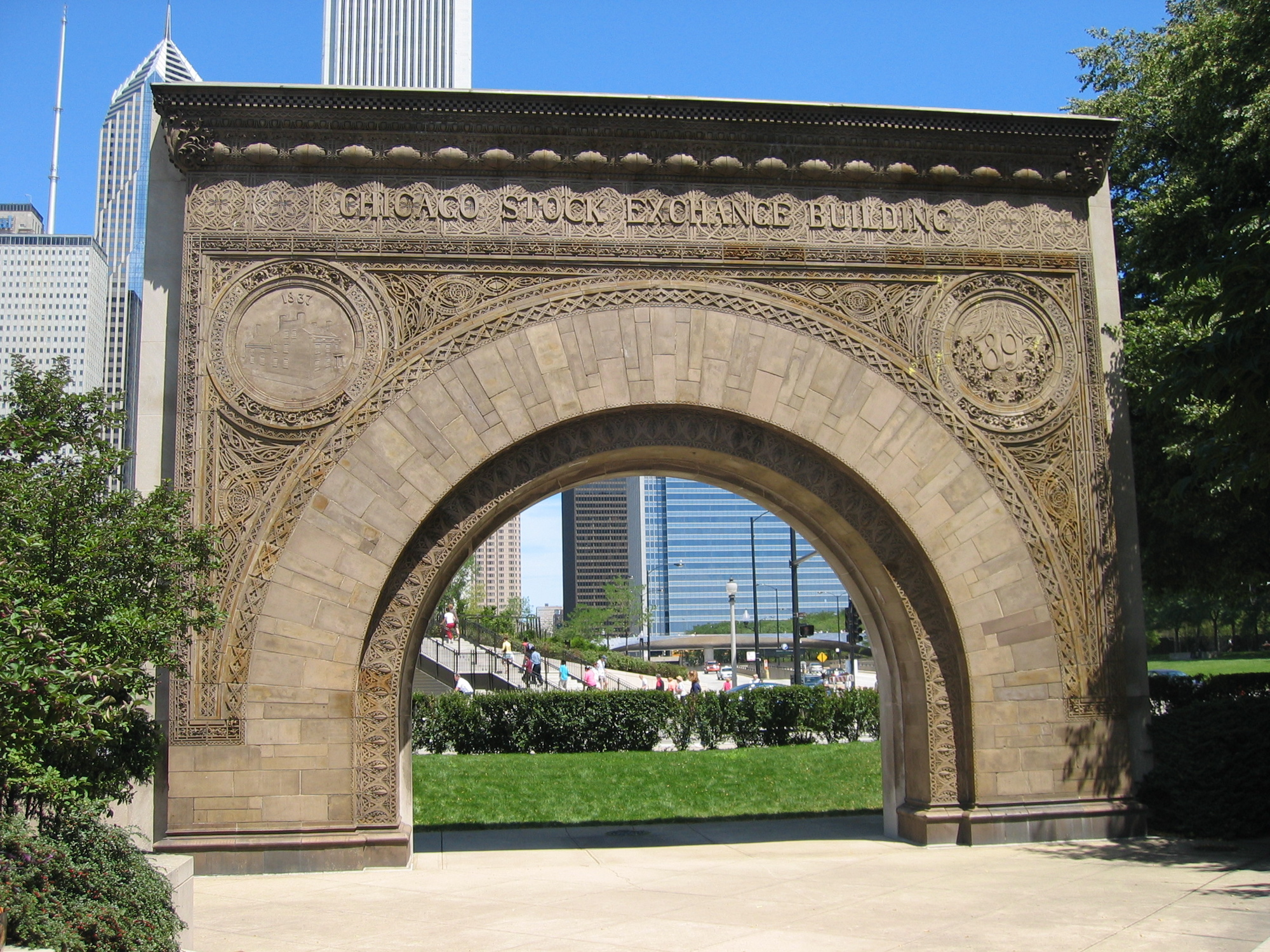
- The arch in 2004
- Artists: Dankmar Adler & Louis Sullivan
- Year: 1893 (133 years ago)
- Medium: Terra-cotta slab
- Condition: Relocated
- Location: Art Institute of Chicago, Chicago; 41.881°N 87.621°W
- Owner: Art Institute of Chicago

The Chicago Stock Exchange Arch is a piece of historical architecture located in Chicago, Illinois, United States. Installed outside of the Art Institute of Chicago, it is one of the few surviving large-scale fragments from the 1893 Chicago Stock Exchange Building.

== History ==
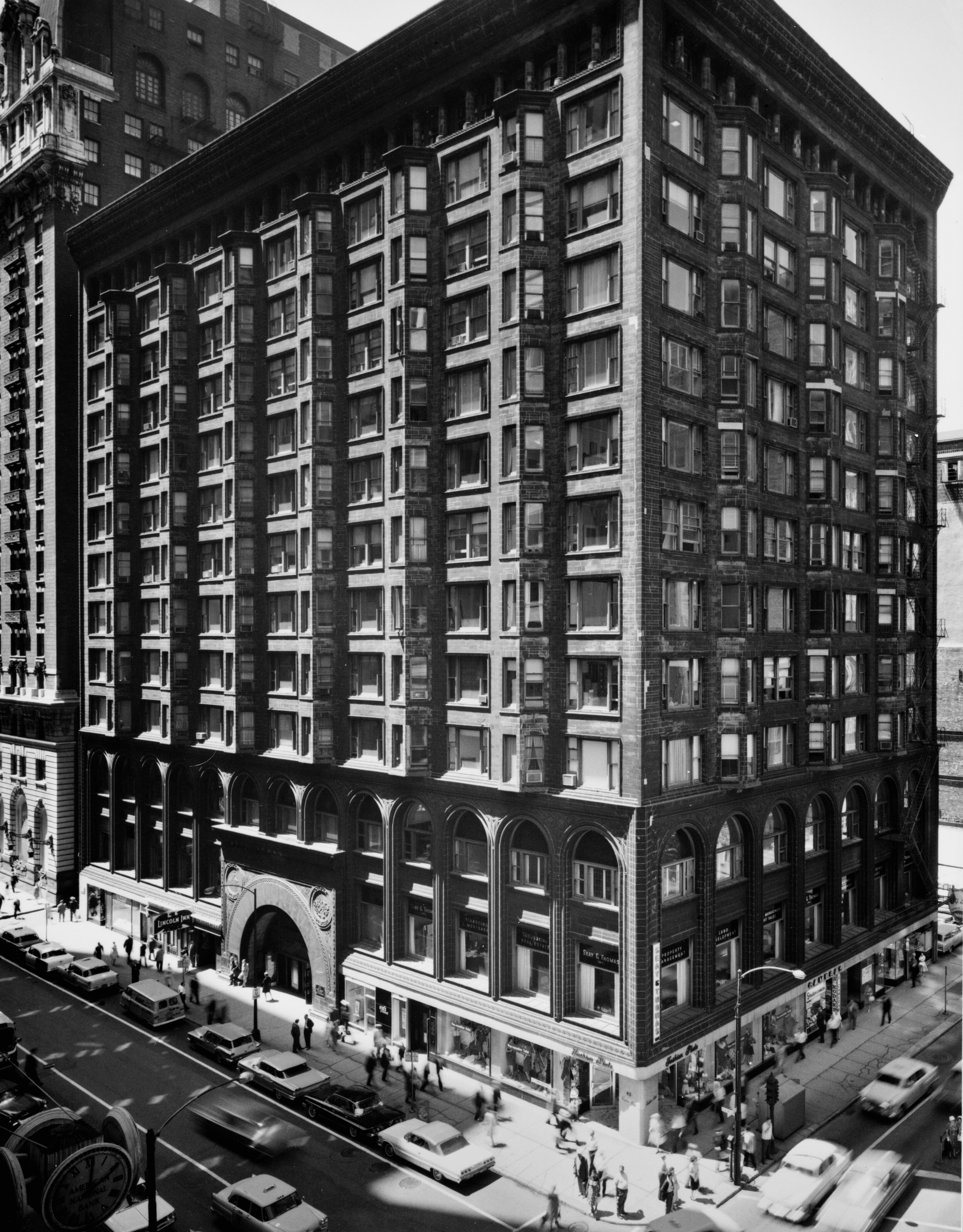
The arch as installed on the bottom center of the longer façade the Chicago Stock Exchange building.

The arch was sculpted by Dankmar Adler and Louis Sullivan in 1893 for the Chicago Stock Exchange Building. Prior to the building's demolition in 1972, the entryway arch and the trading floor were saved for preservation by the Art Institute of Chicago. Other architecturally significant fixtures and pieces from the exchange were preserved, including a staircase saved by The Met Fifth Avenue, and a baluster saved by the Kirkland Museum of Fine & Decorative Art. The building itself was replaced by 30 North LaSalle.

A 1974 donation of $520,000 by Walter E. Heller Foundation allowed for the preservation and reinstallation of the arch and former trading floor. The arch was installed outside the Art Institute of Chicago's east entrance in 1977.

The arch is presently located outside of the Modern Wing of the Art Institute. During the three-and-a-half-year construction of the Modern Wing, the arch had to be shrouded in fabric mesh and scaffolding to protect it from possible construction damage.

== Design ==
Architectural drawings for the arch

The arch was originally installed at the entrance of the Chicago Stock Exchange Building, a thirteen story building housing the city's stock exchange. While doors were originally present in the arch, they were removed when relocated to the Art Institute of Chicago.

== See also ==
- Architectural sculpture in the United States
- List of public art in Chicago
