= Desenberg Building =

Commercial building in Michigan

- U.S. National Register of Historic Places
- U.S. Historic district – Contributing property
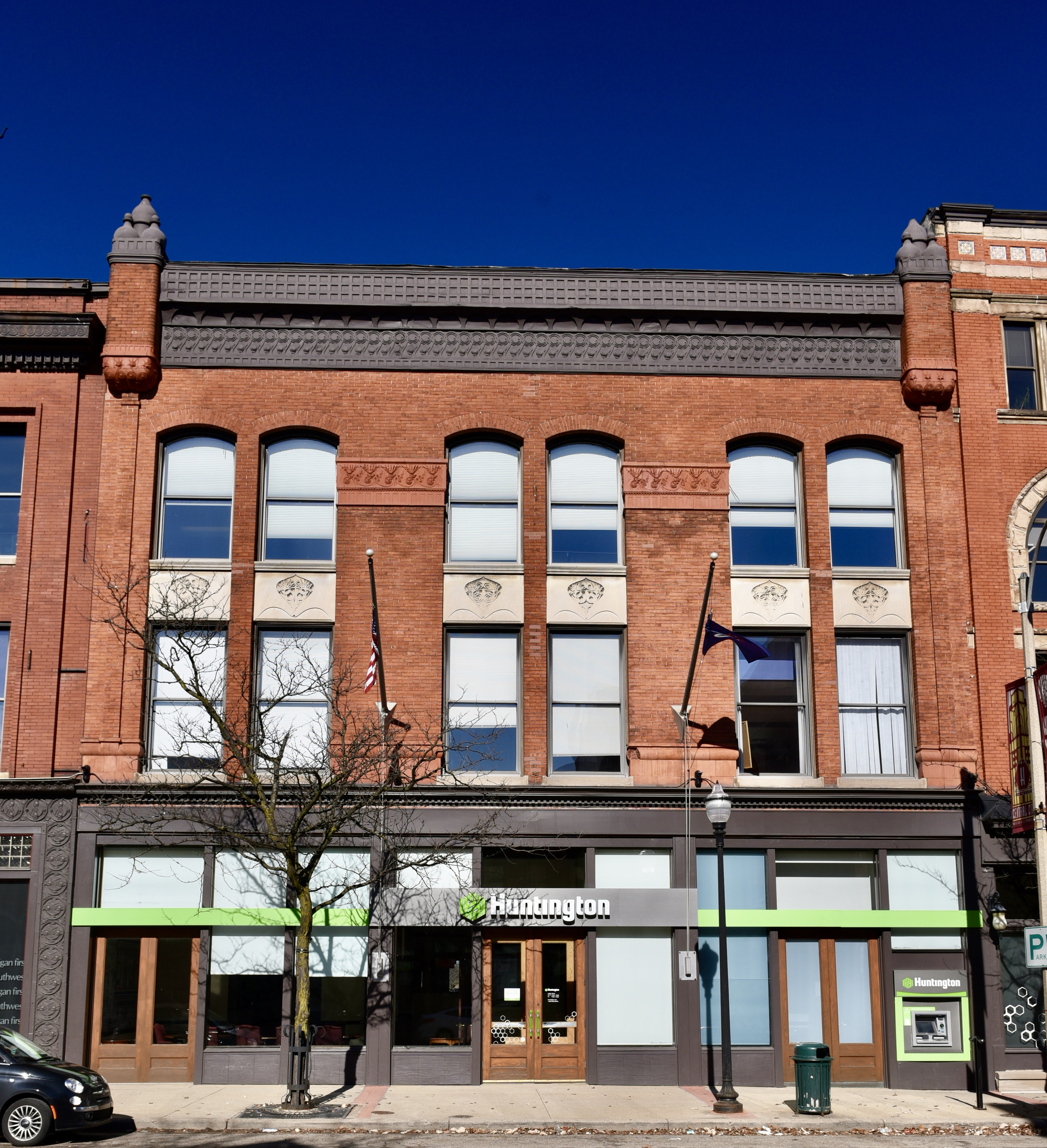
- Interactive map
- Location: 251 E. Michigan Ave., Kalamazoo, Michigan
- Coordinates: 42°17′33″N 85°34′51″W
- Area: less than one acre
- Built: 1885
- Built by: Bush & Patterson
- Architect: Adler & Sullivan
- Architectural style: Chicago
- Part of: Haymarket Historic District (ID83000860)
- NRHP reference No.: 79001158

Significant dates
- Added to NRHP: August 13, 1979
- Designated CP: May 27, 1983

The Desenberg Building is a commercial building located at 251 East Michigan Avenue in Kalamazoo, Michigan, within the Haymarket Historic District. It was listed on the National Register of Historic Places in 1979.

== History ==
In 1885, Bernhard Desenberg planned on building a large commercial block for use as a wholesale grocery. He hired the Chicago firm of Adler & Sullivan (whose principals were Dankmar Adler and Louis Sullivan) to design the building. Adler & Sullivan had previously designed the 1882 Academy of Music Building in Kalamazoo (now demolished), and may have been recommended to Desenberg by Frederick Bush of the contracting firm Bush & Patterson.

== Description ==
The Desenberg Building is a three-story rectangular commercial building with three storefront bays. The building measures approximately 58 feet by 90. The front facade is divided into three horizontal elements: the broad first-floor storefronts, the upper two stories, and the prominent sheet metal cornice running across the top. The upper floors are clad in orange brick. The windows are arranged in three groups of paired windows, with broad piers containing terra cotta bands between the groups.
