= Liebman Adler =

German-American Rabbi (1812–1892)

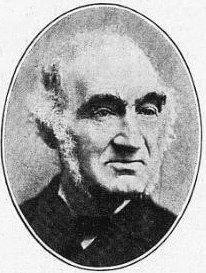
- Born: 1812; Lengsfeld, Saxe-Weimar, Germany
- Died: 1892 (aged 79–80)
- Occupation: Rabbi
- Known for: Rabbi at Temple Beth El, Kehillath Anshe Maarabh
- Notable work: Sabbath Hours (1893)
- Children: Dankmar Adler

Liebman Adler (1812 – 1892) was a prominent U.S. rabbi. Adler was born in the town of Lengsfeld in the Grand Duchy of Saxe-Weimar, Germany. After studying under many prominent Hebrew scholars, he immigrated to America in his early forties, serving as rabbi at Temple Beth El in Detroit, the oldest Jewish congregation in Michigan, before assuming the pulpit of Kehillath Anshe Maarabh ("K.A.M.") in Chicago, the oldest Jewish congregation in Illinois, in 1861. A self-styled "orthodox reformer", he served the congregation for over 20 years, delivering his sermons in German. An "avowed abolitionist", he spoke out forcefully against slavery during the American Civil War. In History of the Jews of Chicago (1924), Hyman L. Meites wrote that Adler was "one of the most beloved rabbis to be found in the country", explaining:

"At last K.A.M. had a rabbi of whom it and the community could be proud, a rabbi who was a tower of strength to the congregation and the community for many years, and who won recognition at once not only for his high-mindedness and earnest Jewish spirit but for his timely patriotic endeavors. He preached many a memorable sermon against slavery, some of which were printed and distributed, and gave a striking proof of the sincerity and depth of his war spirit by sending his son, Dankmar Adler, a mere lad, to the front. Dr. Adler's arrival in Chicago was most timely and seemingly providential."

Adler's fame extended to his writing, as he frequently contributed to Jewish journals and wrote many scholarly articles on a variety of subjects.

In 1884, an historic celebration of Chicago's Jewish history took place to honor the hundredth anniversary of the birth of noted Jewish philanthropist Sir Moses Montefiore. Celebrants of many faiths congregated at the "finest hall in Chicago", the Central Music Hall, a "beautiful and spacious structure" that had been designed by Adler's son, Dankmar. Liebman Adler sat on the daïs for the proceedings.

Shortly after Adler's death, his sermons were translated into English and published in book form in Sabbath Hours (1893).

== Personal ==
His son, Dankmar Adler, was a noted architect and civil engineer who designed several historically important skyscrapers in the 1890s and mentored Frank Lloyd Wright.
