= Richard Nickel =

American photographer, preservationist (1928–1972)

- Born: May 31, 1928; Chicago, Illinois, U.S.
- Died: April 13, 1972 (aged 43); Chicago, Illinois, U.S.
- Resting place: Graceland Cemetery
- Occupations: Architectural photographer, Historical preservationist
- Spouse: Adrienne Dembo (m. 1950)

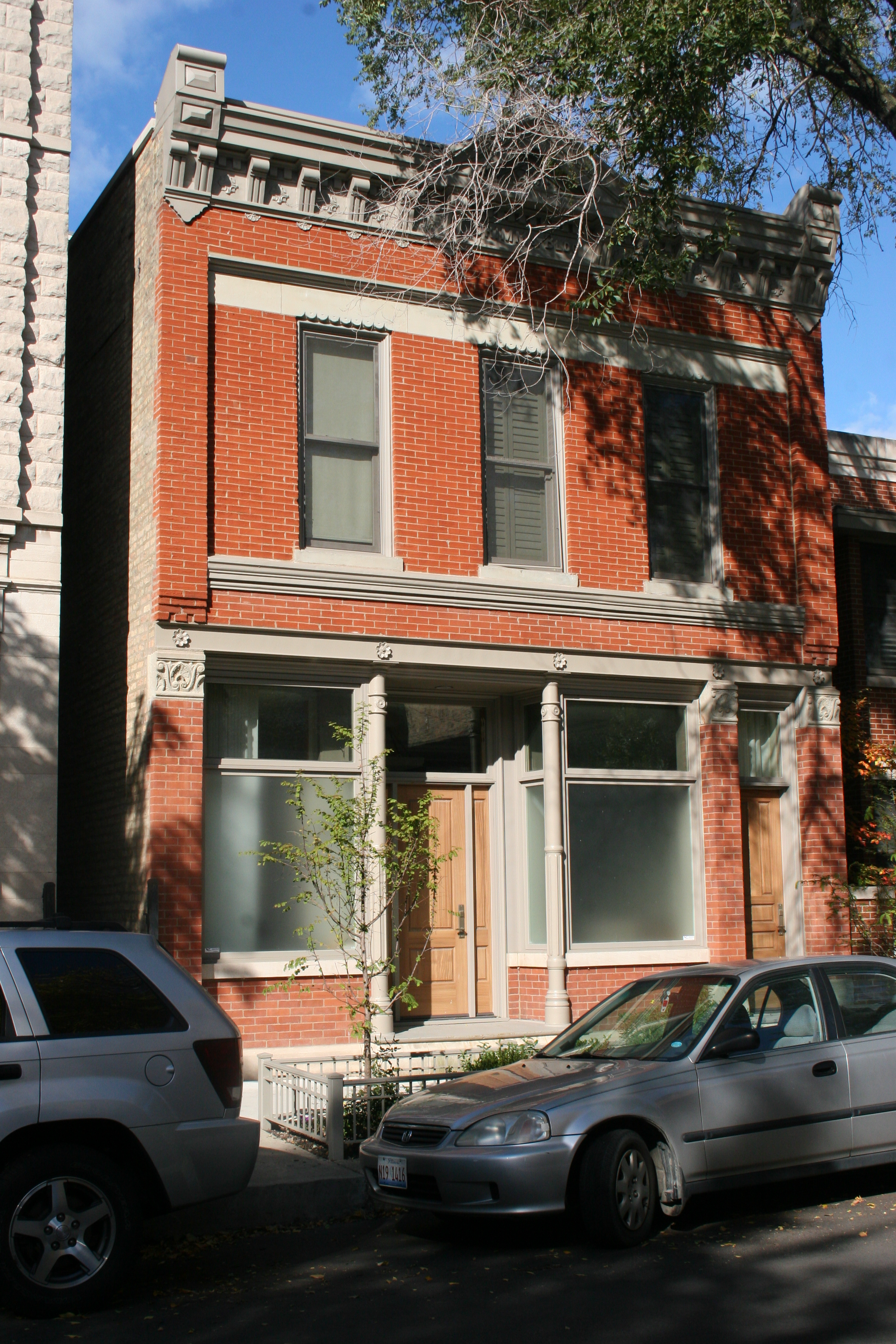
Richard Nickel Studio and residence, in Bucktown Chicago

Richard Stanley Nickel (May 31, 1928 – April 13, 1972) was a Polish American architectural photographer and historical preservationist, who was based in Chicago, Illinois. He is best known for his efforts to preserve and document the buildings of architect Louis Sullivan, and the work of the architecture firm of Adler & Sullivan.

== Early life ==
Richard Nickel was born in the Chicago neighborhood of Humboldt Park in a two-flat located at 4327 W. Haddon. He was raised by first-generation Polish Americans with his grandfather John Nikiel, born in Posen, Germany in 1880. Richard's father, Stanley, a driver for the Polish Daily News, Americanized the surname to Nickel in the face of Anti-Polish sentiment. The family soon moved to 4329 W. Crystal where a young Richard attended grammar school at St. Cyril and Methodius. It was here that Richard first became fascinated by light as he stared at the saintly figures drawn in stained glass. Nickel would tell a reporter in 1969 "That makes an impression on you that you never completely forget. It might be subconscious and, at some point, something triggers it."

The family moved to a second floor apartment at 2457 N. Rockwell in the Logan Square community, while Nickel was in fifth grade and enrolled at St. John Berchman's School. At the time the neighborhood was predominately Polish, and years later Nickel described it as the "Polish neighborhood where I became happily abnormal". The family lived near Logan Boulevard, an area lined with historic mansions and wide parkways that would later become recognized as a Chicago Landmark. More important was his father Stanley's acute interest in photography which Richard would take up as well.

In 1948 after leaving the Army, Nickel was given a victory medal and subsequently enrolled at the Institute of Design, which became part of IIT- The Illinois Institute of Technology. The school was housed in the former Chicago Historical Society building, located at 632 N. Dearborn (northwest corner of Dearborn and Ontario streets).

Nickel married a young Polish American girl named Adrienne Dembo at St. Wenceslaus Church, noted for its Art Deco design, on June 10, 1950. Shortly after, Richard was recalled to serve in the Korean War. After Richard's return a few years later, he was a changed man, with recurring nightmares that he was still in Korea. His mother-in law commented that she saw him as a "casualty of war." The marriage finally ended in divorce.

== Photography and historic preservation ==
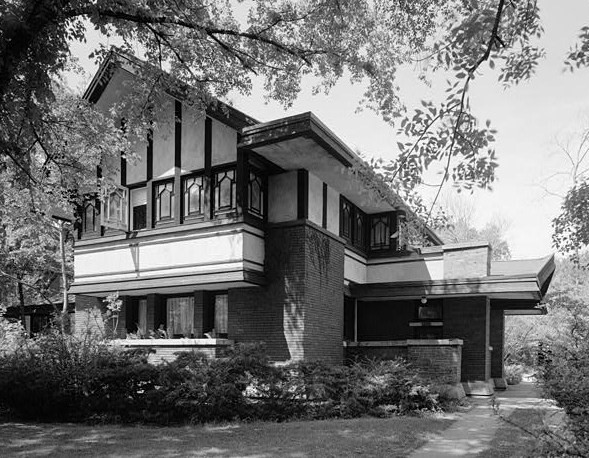
Frederick B Carter, Jr. House, in Evanston, by architect Walter Burley Griffin in the Prairie School style (1910). 1967 HABS image by Richard Nickel.

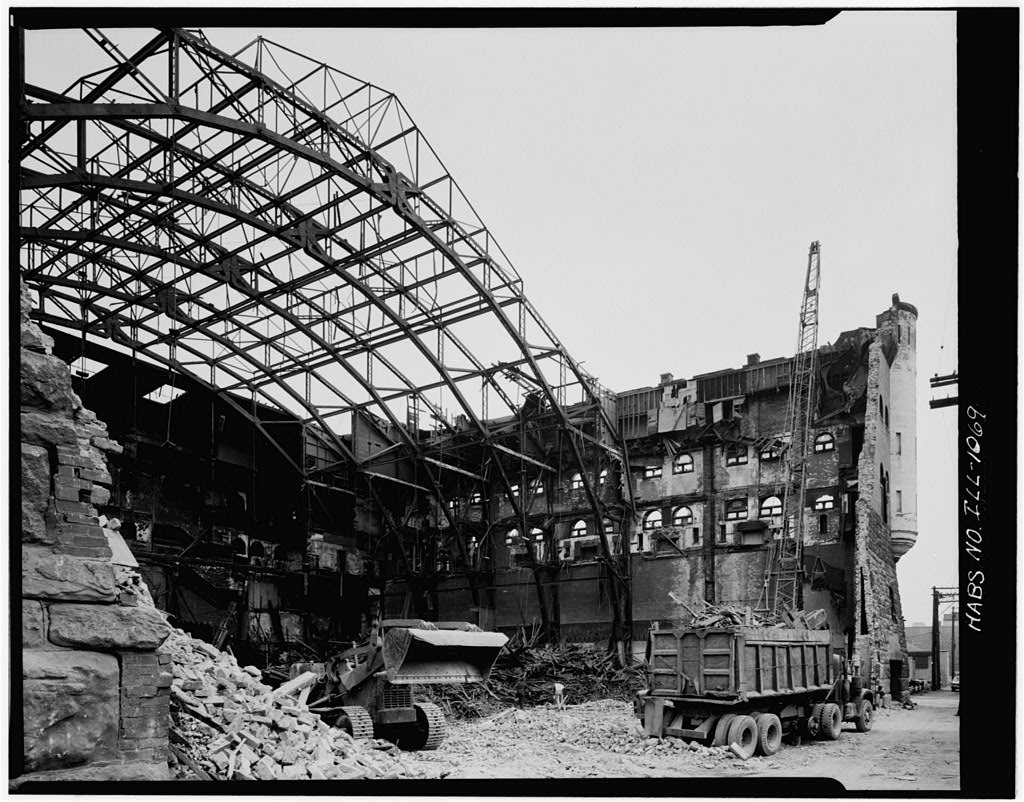
Demolition of the First Regiment Infantry Armory, Chicago. 1967 photograph by Richard Nickel for the HABS—Historic American Buildings Survey.

During the urban regeneration of the 1960s and 1970s, scores of 19th century buildings in Chicago were being demolished. Among these were the works of Louis Sullivan and of other architects designing in the Prairie School style.

By this time many of the buildings were neglected, with little public interest in their retention. Nickel encountered Sullivan's work while photographing the architect's buildings for a school project at the IIT Institute of Design in Chicago under Aaron Siskind. Studying and photographing Sullivan's buildings quickly became an obsession for him. Ultimately, he devoted much of his life to photographing them, hoping to produce a comprehensive photographic compendium. Some were documentation projects for the federal HABS—Historic American Buildings Survey.

Richard Nickel came to believe that such buildings were an important part of Chicago's architectural and cultural heritage. Realizing that the pace of urban renewal and development seriously threatened many of these historic buildings, Nickel campaigned and lobbied for their preservation. Celebrated buildings such as the Garrick Theater and the Chicago Stock Exchange Building were torn down despite the best efforts of Nickel and others to preserve them. However, after Nickel's death, his crusade gained momentum and was responsible for many of Sullivan's buildings eventually being spared. Of the ongoing threat to Chicago's buildings Nickel said "Great architecture has only two natural enemies: water and stupid men."

In the cases where he was unable to protect a building, Nickel extensively photographed both its interior and exterior to archive the craftsmanship and attempt to preserve the buildings' character in his images. He also stripped some of the doomed buildings of their distinctive ornamentation before their destruction. Dozens of such items were sold to Southern Illinois University Edwardsville (SIUE) and are still on display.

Richard Nickel documented many of the architectural masters of Chicago, photographing the work of Burnham & Root, Holabird & Roche, Ludwig Mies van der Rohe, C. F. Murphy Associates, Frank Lloyd Wright, and Skidmore, Owings & Merrill.

=== Residence ===
Nickel's home at 1810 West Cortland Street in Bucktown, Chicago served as his base for photography and salvage operations. Infatuated with the brick building's front elevation, simple floor plan, and history, Nickel referred to it as his "Polish Palazzo". He worked hard to restore the building.

== Death and legacy ==
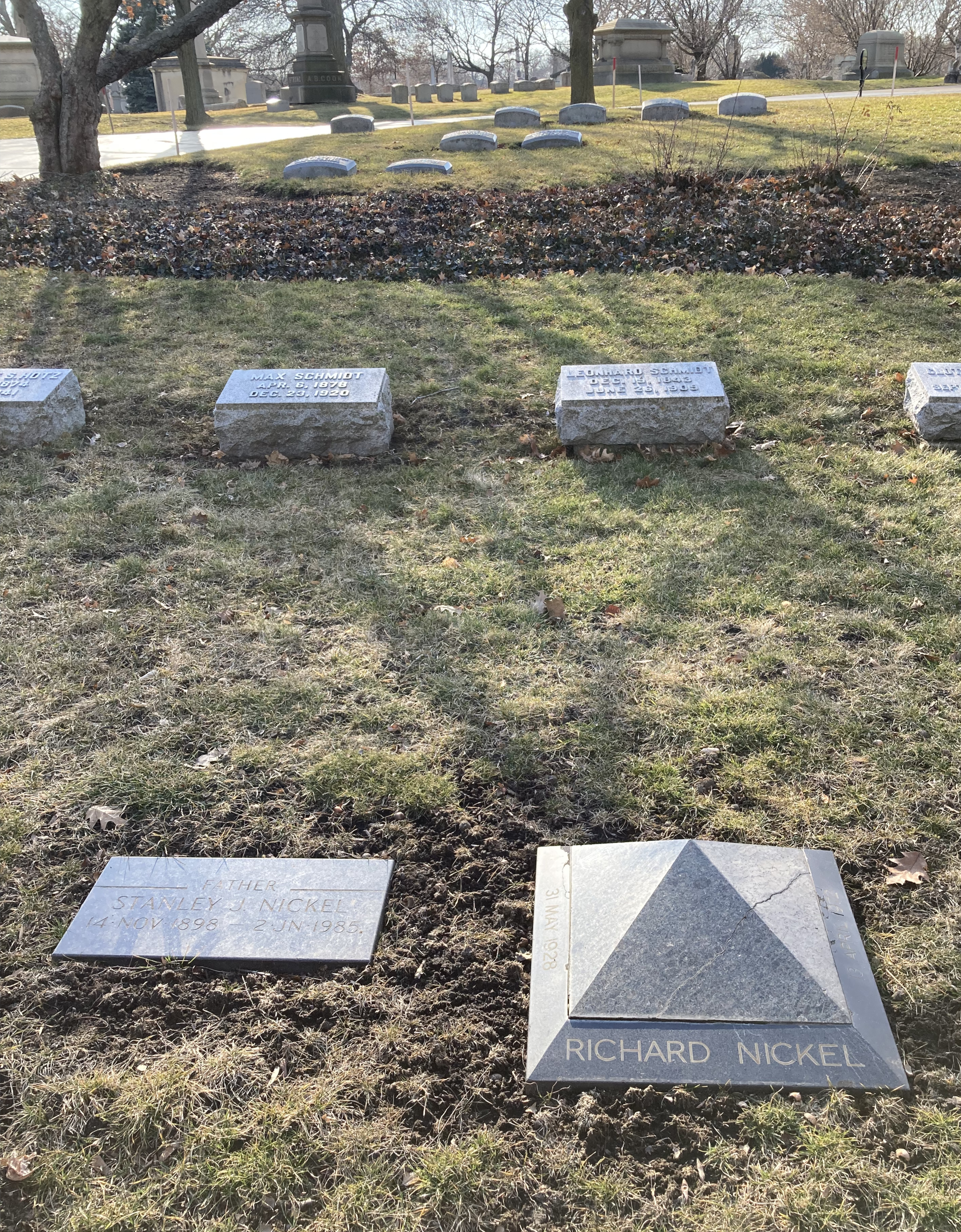
Nickel's grave at Graceland Cemetery

Richard Nickel was killed on April 13, 1972, while attempting to salvage more architectural items when a portion of the old Chicago Stock Exchange Building collapsed on him. His body went unnoticed for some four weeks, until it was uncovered by demolition workers on May 9. He is buried in Chicago's Graceland Cemetery, not far from Louis Sullivan.

The 1994 book by Richard Cahan, They All Fall Down: Richard Nickel's Struggle to Save America's Architecture, is about Nickel's lifelong effort, with friend and architect John Vinci, to preserve Chicago's architectural heritage. Richard Cahan and Michael Williams co-edited a collection of Nickel's photography, titled Richard Nickel's Chicago: Photographs of a Lost City.

=== Works ===
Nickel's black-and-white photos have been displayed at the Art Institute of Chicago and elsewhere. The Richard Nickel Committee and Photographic Archive, a non-profit organization was devoted to preserving the photographer's work for more than 40 years, and holds the copyrights for most of his pictures.

Nickel died without completing a book that he had begun in the 1950s, of his large collection of photographs of Sullivan's work that he took. The book was finally completed and published in 2010, The Complete Architecture of Adler & Sullivan — by Richard Nickel, with Aaron Siskind, John Vinci, and Ward Miller.

==== Richard Nickel Archive ====
Richard Nickel's works, which include negatives, photographs, and research papers, have been donated to the Ryerson and Burnham Libraries at the Art Institute of Chicago by the Richard Nickel Committee in 2010.

The Richard Nickel Archive collection is accessible to the public at the Art Institute, along with a finding aid to the collection. Also, more than 1,300 images from the Richard Nickel Committee's donated collection are available for viewing online at the Ryerson and Burnham Libraries' website pages for the Richard Nickel Archive.

Numerous duplicate photographs have been donated over time to other institutions, including The Arts Club of Chicago, the Society of Architectural Historians, Landmarks Illinois, and Preservation Chicago. Photographs of the Garrick Theatre were donated by the Richard Nickel Committee to the collection of the Polish Museum of America in Chicago.
