= Fountainhead (Jackson, Mississippi) =

Historic house in Mississippi, US

- U.S. National Register of Historic Places
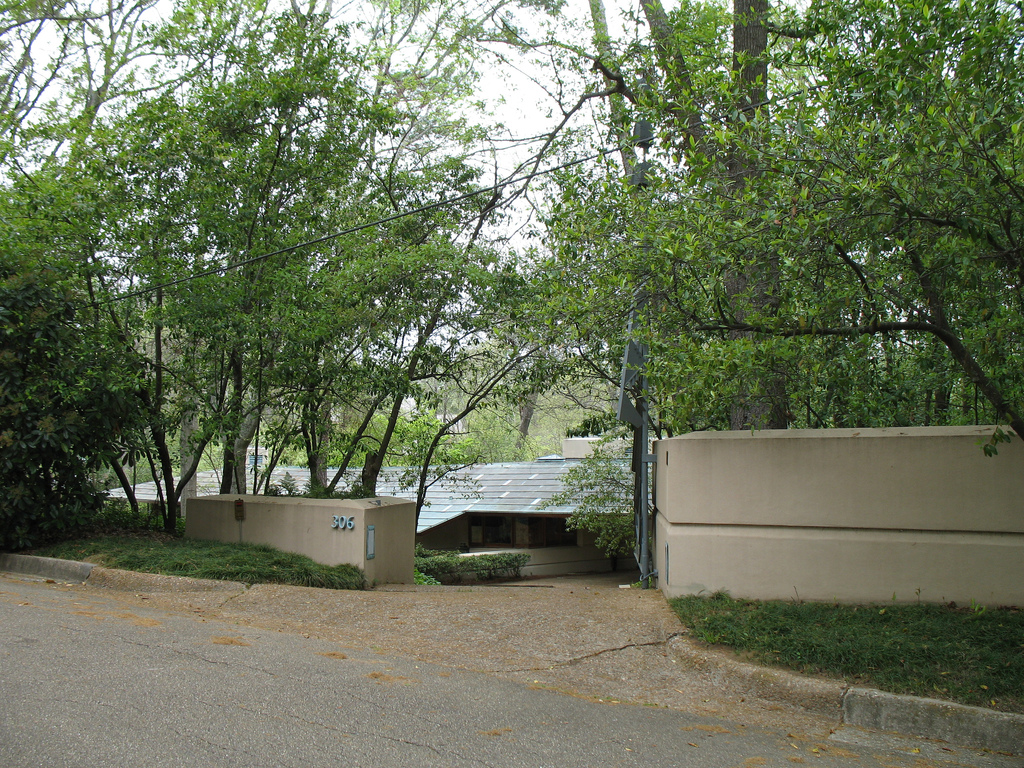

- Location within Mississippi Location within the United States
- Location: 306 Glenway Drive, Jackson, Mississippi
- Coordinates: 32°20′09″N 90°10′08″W
- Built: 1950–54
- Architects: Wright, Frank Lloyd
- Architectural style: Modern Movement, Usonian House
- NRHP reference No.: 80002246
- Added to NRHP: November 28, 1980

Fountainhead (also known as the J. Willis Hughes House) is a house at 306 Glenway Drive in Jackson, Mississippi, United States. Designed in the Usonian style by architect Frank Lloyd Wright for the family of the oil businessman J. Willis Hughes, it is arranged in a Y shape and is made of tidewater red cypress, copper, glass, and concrete. The floor plan is arranged around a grid of 30-60-90 triangles, which create a grid of rhombuses. The interior consists of a living-room wing facing northeast, a carport wing facing southeast, and a bedroom wing facing west toward a fountain.

Hughes hired Wright to design the house in 1948, and it was built between 1950 and 1954. During development, Hughes named the house Fountainhead, a reference to both the fountain outside the bedroom wing and the 1943 novel The Fountainhead, by Ayn Rand. He lived there for 25 years, but the building fell into disrepair after Hughes's wife died in 1964. The architect Robert Parker Adams bought the house in 1979 and restored it, living there for over 45 years before selling it to the Mississippi Museum of Art in 2025. The house, one of Wright's few designs to be constructed in Mississippi, is listed on the National Register of Historic Places.

== Description ==
Fountainhead is located at 306 Glenway Drive, at the intersection with Woodland Drive, in the Fondren neighborhood of Jackson, Mississippi, United States. The house is placed on a tree-lined slope on a plot of land spanning 0.97 acres (0.39 ha). The plot slopes downward from both roads. The house is part of the Woodland Hills subdivision, which was originally intended to be the site of a cemetery before being split into multiple lots in 1928. At the western end of the plot, water cascades from the fountain into a pool and a pond, leading to a nearby creek.

Built for the family of the oil businessman J. Willis Hughes, Fountainhead is one of two extant works designed by Frank Lloyd Wright in Mississippi, (Note: Some sources cite the house as Wright's only Mississippi design or one of two Wright designs ever constructed in the state.) as well as one of four buildings he designed in the state and the only such work outside Ocean Springs. Of his other three works, the Charnley–Norwood House still exists, while Welbie L. Fuller Residence and Louis Sullivan Bungalow in Ocean Springs are no longer extant. Fountainhead is designed in the Usonian style, making it one of about 60 Usonian houses created by Wright. It is made of four materials: Tidewater red cypress, copper (which is used in the roof), glass, and concrete.

=== Exterior ===
The house is arranged in a Y shape. The building is arranged around a grid of 30-60-90 triangles, which create a grid of rhombuses, or equilateral parallelograms. Each rhombus measures about 4 feet (1.2 m) on each side. The use of rhombuses was influenced by the site's topography, and the door sizes and wall placements were influenced by the rhombus grid. Due to the house's floor grid and relative lack of right angles, its second owner Robert Parker Adams quipped that the house had "no square feet, only triangular feet". The exterior terraces and driveway, which are made of concrete, are constructed on this rhombus grid. The dining-room terrace, accessed by a series of glass doors, faces northeast to maximize sunlight exposure at sunrise.

As designed, the main entrance was not easy to reach, consisting of a Dutch door concealed behind a triangular concrete planter. Next to the main entrance is a glass window wrapping around one corner, as well as a carport. The exterior walls are made of concrete slabs measuring between 12 and 24 inches (300 and 610 mm) thick and finished with a layer of sand. The shutters have Japanese- and Native American-inspired geometric motifs. To make the interior rooms feel like they were outdoors, Wright did not add either shutters or window screens to the windows.

The roof is made of copper and cantilevers outward from the facade on all sides. Underneath the copper roof are a series of plywood boards and fir joists, and there is a steel I-beam supporting the roof on the northern elevation of the facade. The roof above the living room protrudes up to 16 feet (4.9 m) above the living-room terrace.

=== Interior ===
The interior covers either 2,600 square feet (240 m^{2}), 3,500 square feet (330 m^{2}), or 3,558 square feet (330.5 m^{2}). The house includes three bedrooms, in addition to four bathrooms (two of which are full baths). The walls and ceilings are made of Tidewater red cypress. The interiors are subdivided by triple-layered sandwich walls, which consist of a central layer of plywood, wedged between two layers of battens and horizontal cypress boards. The floor slabs are made of red-tinted concrete, with ruts in the floors corresponding to the rhombus floor grid. The spaces are illuminated by triangular skylights in the ceiling and triangular lights built into the floor slab. Doors throughout the house are narrower than typical doors, since Wright designed them around his own dimensions. There are three fireplaces throughout the house, in addition to a radiant heating system embedded in the floors. The house originally did not have an air-conditioning system, but it did have two fans in the attic, and natural ventilation was provided by the windows.

In general, the interiors are arranged in an open plan layout. Similar to Wright's other houses, there is built-in storage space and furniture, including dressers, seats, tables, and beds embedded into the walls. Wright designed the built-in furniture, and he also built standalone furniture such as 20 stools and various tables and chairs. Next to the entrance is a large fireplace, which adjoins a living room. The living room extends to the northeast of the house. It has a ceiling measuring 13 or 14 feet (4.0 or 4.3 m) high, with a tall glass wall. Within the living-room wing is a dining alcove with a three-section dining table and built-in seating. The living-room wing also has a guest bathroom and a kitchen, the latter of which has European-style open shelves.

The bedroom wing forms the western arm of the "Y", overlooking the fountain. These rooms include built-in dressers and other furniture designed by Wright. The master bedroom was originally intended for the Hughes parents, and there is a dormitory-style room for their four sons and a third room used by their only daughter. The master bedroom contains a fireplace and an en-suite bathroom. The daughter's bedroom has a fireplace as well, and the bedroom wing also has a standalone full bathroom and a half-bathroom. The sons' dormitory originally included bunk beds, a chest of drawers, and a desk for four people. As built, there was also a guest bedroom. A gallery with open shelves connects all of the rooms in the bedroom wing, terminating at a door that overlooks the waterfall. There is a carport wing extending to the southeast of the "Y", as well as a utility room, boiler room, and bathroom in the basement.

== History ==
=== Development ===
The house was built for J. Willis Hughes, an oil-industry businessman who had decided to hire Wright after reading an essay by the architect in the 1920s, while Hughes was in college. Hughes eventually commissioned Wright in 1948 to design a house for his family. Hughes initially obtained a flat piece of ground and sent photographs of it to Wright, who asked Hughes to find him a more topographically complicated site. This prompted Hughes to acquire a wooded, hilly site on Glenway Drive, abutting a stream. Hughes named the house "Fountainhead" in part because of the fountain outside the house. The name was also a reference to Ayn Rand's novel The Fountainhead, whose main character was allegedly inspired by Wright.

The Hughes House was built between 1950 and 1954. The family lived in tents, then in the house's basement, as work proceeded. The project experienced multiple delays; the bulk of construction did not start until 1952, as Hughes initially could not afford the house due to fluctuating oil prices. Wright had wanted to use native stone, but after finding that there were no nearby expanses of stone, decided to use brick. The final design substituted brick with concrete, which was brought to the site in small truckloads. The house's concrete slabs were vandalized during construction, so workers covered up the vandalism by spraying layers of paint and sand on it. Hughes's son Michael Hughes recalled that Wright had found solutions for various aspects of the design, including the cantilevered roof, that Hughes had believed were impossible to construct. One neighbor later recalled that the house's construction had received little publicity.

=== Usage ===
==== Residential use ====
The Hughes family lived there with their five children; the family owned it for 25 years, during which it sustained gradual deterioration. Although Wright had been satisfied with the sloped site, the ground was made of Yazoo Clay, which led to structural issues after the house was finished. The varying moisture of the Yazoo Clay caused the floor slabs and windows to crack, and the house experienced further leaks, which damaged the ceilings and walls. Other issues arose because of the slope of the land. At its worst extent, the floor sloped down 19 inches (480 mm) between the living-room terrace and the westernmost bedroom. Hughes's wife died in a car crash in 1964. After that, he let the house crumble into such disrepair that there were discussions about destroying the building.

The next owner of the Hughes House was a local architect, Robert Parker Adams, who bought the residence in 1979 and lived there with his wife Mary. The building was added to the National Register of Historic Places in 1980; it was cited at the time as the most valuable modern-style structure in Mississippi. Adams restored the house after acquiring it, adding an air-conditioning system and resurfacing the floor slab. Adams injected a composite material of clay, sand, and mud beneath the foundation to reduce the floor's slant, dug trenches around the house, filled cracks in the floor, and cleaned the concrete and wood inside. Though he spent three years on the project, Adams said the renovation was a "work of love" and that he was not tired of it. He characterized the house as growing out of the ground and stated that he liked the house's floor grid, sloped walls, and roof. During his 45 years in the house, Adams gave tours of his residence, which often lasted at least two hours.

==== Museum use ====
In 2025, Adams placed the house for sale for $2.5 million, several weeks before he died. The Mississippi Museum of Art (MMA) negotiated to acquire it, and it requested and received a zoning variance that October, allowing the house to be repurposed for public use. The MMA finalized its purchase that November, with plans to renovate and open it to the public. As part of the purchase, the MMA agreed to preserve Fountainhead's furniture and architectural details, making it one of a few museums in the U.S. to own a Wright-designed house. At the time, the building needed structural repairs; there was a crack on a rear wall, and parts of the floor had settled due to shifting clay underneath.

The renovation was scheduled to cost $2 million and last one year; two donors had agreed to pay the renovation's cost. Jennifer Baughn was appointed as the house's first curator in April 2026, and Belinda Stewart Architects was hired that July to manage the renovation. By late 2026, the renovation was about to begin, and the house was scheduled to reopen in 2028. Once the renovation was completed, the MMA planned to operate a shuttle service between the house and the main museum building.

== Reception ==
A writer for The Washington Post wrote that the building was almost imperceptible from the road, but that "its low copper roof and slab chimneys declare 'Frank Lloyd Wright'". When the house was placed for sale in 2024, a Wall Street Journal writer stated that the house was "a powerful composition in which every part of the building complements every other", in part because of its rhombus layout. Wright's acolytes also compared Fountainhead to the architect's better-known Usonian works.

== See also ==
- List of Frank Lloyd Wright works
- National Register of Historic Places listings in Hinds County, Mississippi
