= Central Music Hall =

Central Music Hall may refer to:

- Central Music Hall (Steinway Hall) (1915–1923), a theater in the Steinway Hall building at 64 E. Van Buren Street, Chicago
- Central Music Hall (Chicago) (1879–1900), a building and theater at SE corner of State and Randolph Streets, Chicago.
