= Haymarket Historic District =

- U.S. National Register of Historic Places
- U.S. Historic district
- Michigan State Historic Site
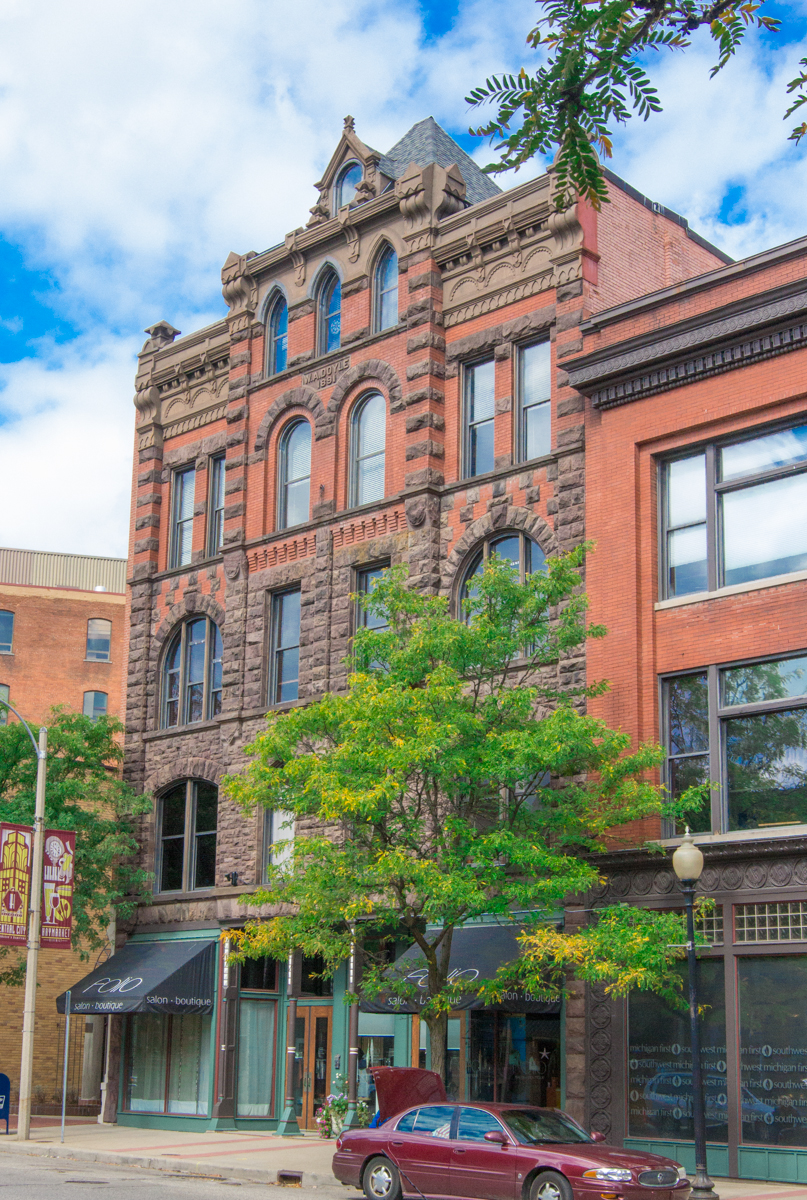

- Location within Michigan Location within the United States
- Interactive map showing the location for Haymarket Historic District
- Location: Michigan Ave. between Portage St. and Grand Rapids & Indiana RR, Kalamazoo, Michigan
- Coordinates: 42°17′33″N 85°34′49″W
- Area: 5.5 acres (2.2 ha)
- Architect: Adler & Sullivan
- Architectural style: Chicago, Mixed (more Than 2 Styles From Different Periods)
- MPS: Kalamazoo MRA
- NRHP reference No.: 83000860 (original); 11000221 (increase)

Significant dates
- Added to NRHP: May 27, 1983
- Boundary increase: May 2, 2011

For other Haymarket districts see Haymarket District (disambiguation)

The Haymarket Historic District is a primarily commercial historic area in Kalamazoo, Michigan. It was listed on the National Register of Historic Places on May 27, 1983. The area includes Michigan Avenue between Portage St. and the Grand Rapids and Indiana Railroad line; also 105-141 E. Michigan Avenue. It covers 55 acres and includes 22 buildings. The district's boundaries were increased on May 2, 2011.

== History ==
Early commercial development in Kalamazoo was along the Michigan Avenue corridor, just west of the Haymarket Historic District. In 1867, the Lake Shore and Michigan Southern Railway constructed a rail line to the east of the commercial district, followed in 1870 by another line built by the Grand Rapids and Indiana Railroad, which crossed Michigan nearby. The opportunities of the railroad spurred commercial growth farther to the east, into the Haymarket area. This area developed rapidly, with buildings constructed between 1870 and the end of the century.

The railroads also spurred an influx of German and German Jewish residents, following earlier emigrants who had settled in Kalamazoo in the mid-1800s. Many of these set up shop in the new Haymarket district. The commercial buildings in the Haymarket Historic District are associated with Kalamazoo's German and German Jewish communities, which established a presence in the area during the late 1800s and early 1900s. Early German and German Jewish businesses located in the district included the Sam Rosenbaum & Sons Company clothing factory and the Desenberg Grocery Company wholesale grocery.

In the 21st century, the area offers shopping and dining opportunities and is home to the Kalamazoo Ballet Company. There are also several banks and the Arcadia Creek Post Office. Prominent buildings in the district include Arcus Depot (formerly the Grand Rapids and Indiana Line Station of the Grand Rapids and Indiana Railroad), The Wine Loft, London Grill, Kalamazoo City Savings Bank, Olde Peninsula Brewpub, and Ouzo's European Grill.

== Description ==
The Haymarket Historic District is notable for the concentration of fine Victorian and early twentieth-century commercial buildings. The architectural styles represented range from Italianate and Late Victorian Panel Brick to Richardsonian Romanesque and to Sullivanesque (including one building actually designed by Louis Sullivan) to Neoclassical and Commercial Brick style.

The Desenberg Building, individually listed on the National Register, is located within the district.

== See also ==
- National Register of Historic Places listings in Kalamazoo County, Michigan
