= Chicago Stock Exchange Building =

Building in Chicago, Illinois (1894–1971)

- Formerly listed on the U.S. National Register of Historic Places
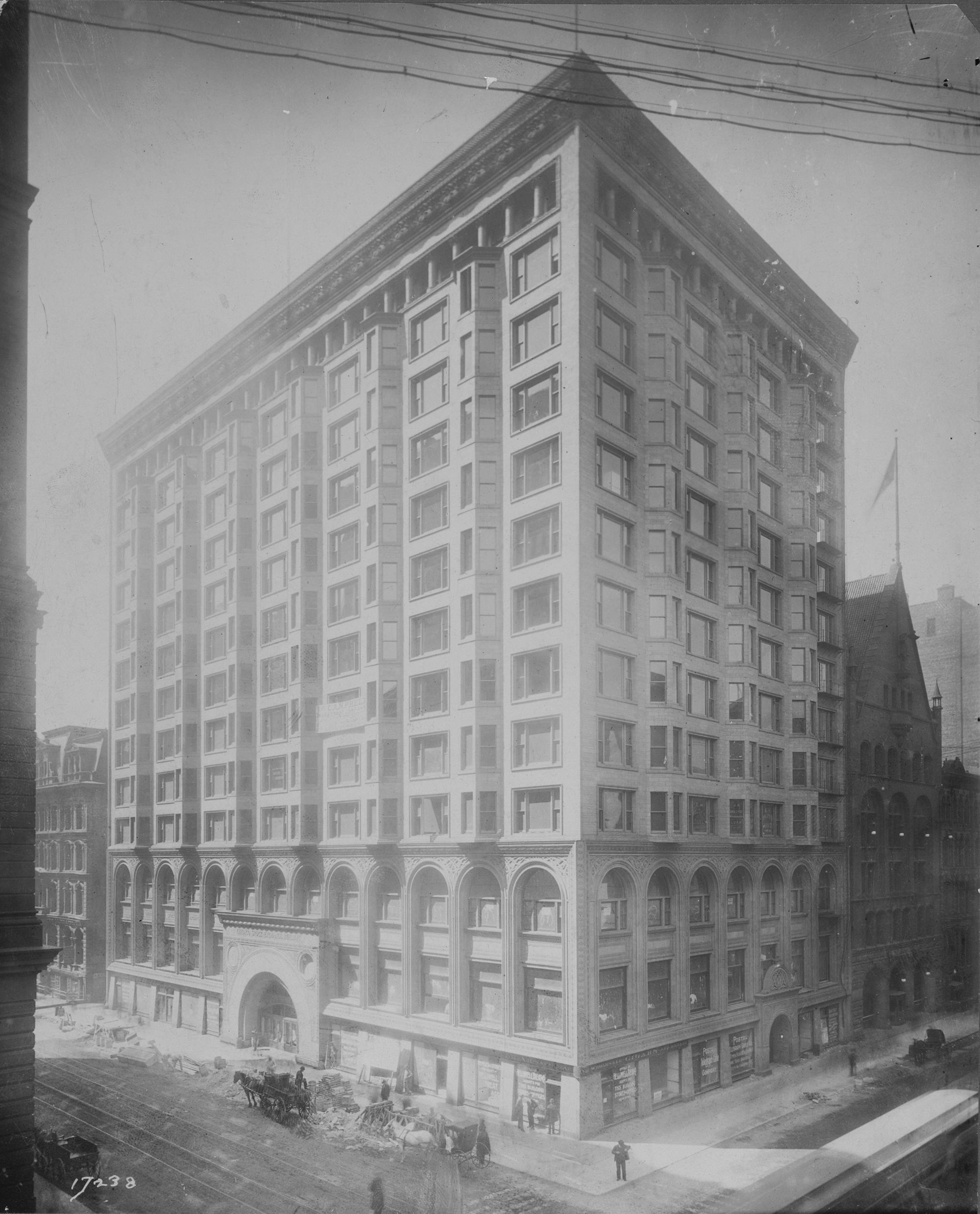

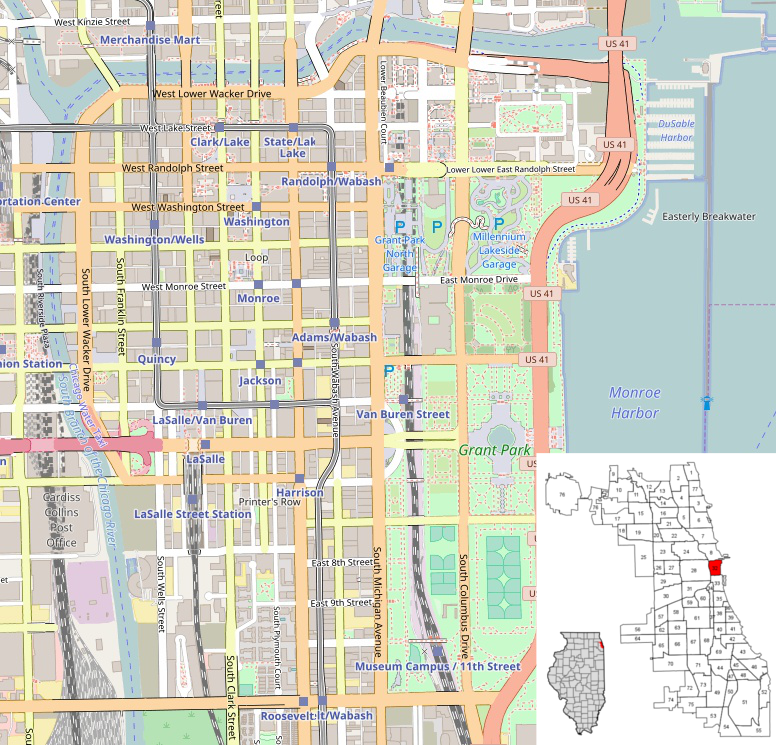
- Location within Chicago Loop Location within Chicago metropolitan area Location within Illinois Location within the United States
- Location: 30 N. LaSalle St., Chicago, Illinois
- Coordinates: 41.8823°N 87.6324°W
- Area: 9.9 acres (4.0 ha)
- Built: 1893
- Architect: Adler & Sullivan
- NRHP reference No.: 70000911

Significant dates
- Added to NRHP: March 26, 1970
- Removed from NRHP: December 7, 1971

The Chicago Stock Exchange Building was a 13-story office building at 30 North LaSalle Street in the Loop community area of Chicago, Illinois, United States. Designed by Dankmar Adler and Louis Sullivan of Adler & Sullivan in the early Chicago school style, it opened in 1894. The building was named for the Chicago Stock Exchange, which originally occupied a trading room inside. The building's demolition between 1971 and 1972, in the face of major efforts to save it, spurred preservation and salvage efforts across Chicago and the US.

The Stock Exchange Building occupied the southwest corner of LaSalle and Washington streets, with an E-shaped massing surrounding two light courts to the west. The main facades were made of buff-colored terracotta, grouped vertically into bays, while other facades were made of white enameled bricks. The lowest three stories constituted the base and included a large entrance arch, and the upper stories had protruding bays. The building rested on a foundation of pilings and caissons, with a steel frame above. There were a lobby and shops at ground level, a double-height trading room on the second floor, and offices above.

The Stock Exchange Building was erected in 1893–1894. The Chicago Stock Exchange occupied it only until 1908, though the building was known for the Stock Exchange Building for the remainder of its existence. It was sold to the Cyrus McCormick family in 1898, then to Sudler & Co. in 1957. The building was dilapidated and unprofitable by the late 1960s, prompting Sudler to resell it for development. Despite repeated efforts to preserve the Stock Exchange Building, it was ultimately demolished and replaced with the 30 North LaSalle skyscraper; preservationist Richard Nickel, who tried to preserve some of the design features, was killed during its demolition. The arch and trading floor were eventually relocated to the Art Institute of Chicago Building in 1977, while other parts of the building, such as stairs, were dispersed elsewhere.

== Site ==
The Chicago Stock Exchange Building occupied the southwest corner of LaSalle and Washington streets in the Loop community area of Chicago, Illinois, United States. The building measured approximately 100 by 180 feet (30 by 55 m) across. The building's longer frontage was on LaSalle Street to the east, where the main entrance was located, while the secondary frontage and entrance faced Washington Street to the north. An alley adjoined the building to the south. The site's western lot line adjoined a light court belonging to the Chicago Herald American building to the west. To the south was the Oriental Building, later replaced by the La Salle Hotel in the 1900s.

The site was previously a swamp located 5 feet (1.5 m) above the high-tide level of Lake Michigan; subsequent filling works raised the site to 14 feet (4.3 m) above the lake. When the town of Chicago was settled in the early 19th century, the site was originally designated as block 55, lot 1. On the site was originally the house of P. F. W Peck. Built in 1837, Peck's house was originally thought to be the first brick house in Chicago. but this was later discovered to be untrue. Peck's house was demolished in 1868 to make way for the Union Building, which in turn burned during the Great Chicago Fire in 1871. Peck's son was businessman Ferdinand Peck, who previously hired the firm of Adler & Sullivan to design the Auditorium Building several blocks away.

== Architecture ==
The Chicago Stock Exchange Building was designed by Dankmar Adler and Louis Sullivan, of Adler & Sullivan, as an early Chicago school-style work. William Sooy Smith was the foundation engineer, and Falkenau and Company is credited as the building's general contractor. A. Gottlieb and Co. was involved with the steelwork. The design was similar to that of the Ashland Block, designed by Daniel Burnham in 1892. it reportedly used 2.5 million bricks, 2,800 plate glass windows, 1,000 doors, 3,220 short tons (2,880 long tons; 2,920 t) of iron, and 100,000 square feet (9,300 m^{2}) of marble slabs.

=== Exterior ===
The building was 13 stories high. Its roof was variously cited as being 161 feet (49 m) or 172 feet (52 m) above ground. There were two light courts to the west (at the building's rear), which gave the building an E-shaped massing with three wings. The exterior was divided vertically into thirteen bays on the east and seven on the north. Above the third story, the southern elevations was recessed 13 feet (4.0 m) from the alley to the south. There were also two chimneys protruding above the roofline.

The eastern and northern elevations were made of buff-colored terracotta. LaSalle Street narrowed as it continued south, giving the impression that the eastern elevation loomed over the street. The interior courts and the side walls were made of white enameled bricks; unlike with Adler & Sullivan's other buildings, the western wall was designed as a plain flat-plane surface, without ornamentation. The decorative details on the northern and western elevations lacked a dominant vertical or horizontal orientation, in contrast with the firm's other designs. The design continued Sullivan's "form follows function" philosophy and was visually divided into three sections: a base, shaft, and attic.

==== Base ====
The base comprised the first through third stories. The ground or first floor was visually treated as a basement. The main entrance arch on LaSalle Street, protruding into the second story, was part of a portal measuring 40 by 30 feet (12.2 by 9.1 m) across. The portal spanned three bays, but the arched opening inside it was only 23 feet (7.0 m) wide. It had an ornamental panel above it, which was later replaced with glass. The spandrel above the arch's upper-left corner depicted the house of P. F. W. Peck, while the spandrel above the upper-right corner depicted the year 1893. The arch originally had four bronze doors, but by the 1960s, it contained a revolving door. A side entrance existed on Washington Street, measuring 11 feet (3.4 m) across.

The second and third stories consisted of double-height arches superimposed above the ground-floor storefronts, acting as an arcade. The designs of these stories was intended to indicate the presence of the trading rooms inside.

==== Upper stories ====
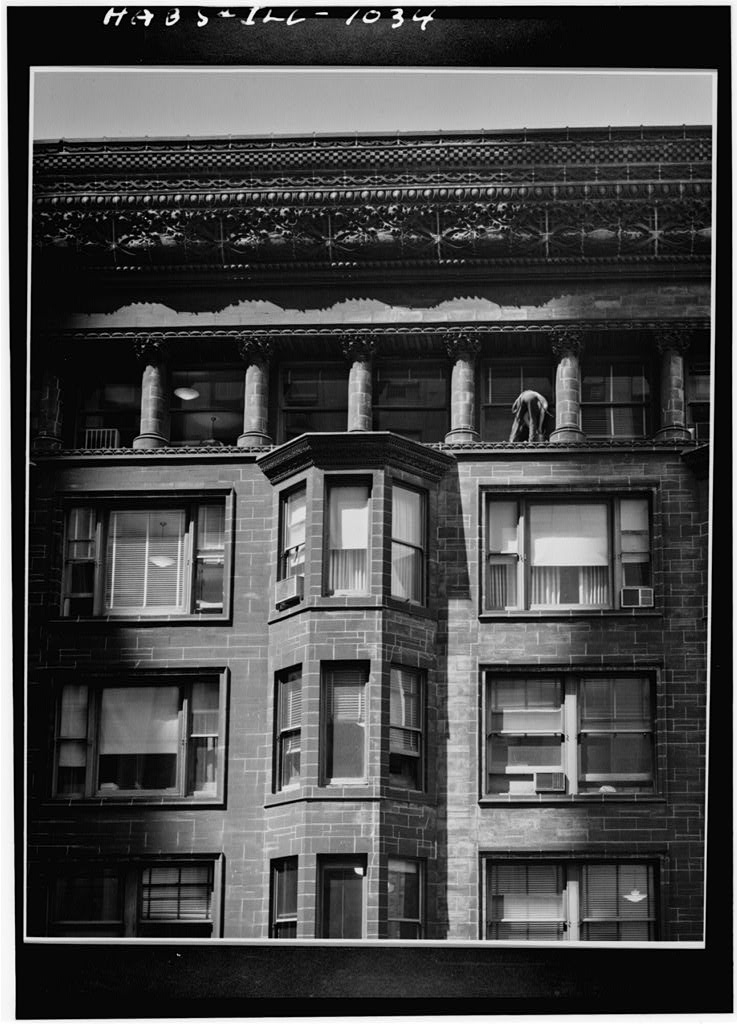
Detail of bay windows

The facade was relatively plain above the base. Bay windows extended from the fourth through the twelfth floors, a refinement of the oriel windows that Adler & Sullivan had planned for St. Louis's unbuilt Mercantile Club. There were three groups of bay windows on the northern elevation and six on the eastern elevation. The bay windows, which served no structural purpose, were intended to maximize natural light exposure for the offices inside. Combined created the appearance of a corrugated surface. The bay windows slanted inward on either side, visually interrupting the horizontal windowsills.

The wall surfaces between the bay windows were interspersed with plain rectangular openings, which were filled with horizontally oriented Chicago windows. These windows consisted of large central panels flanked by one-over-one sash windows. The top floor was treated like an attic. and it functioned as a colonnade with additional windows. The building was topped by a cornice measuring 9 feet (2.7 m) tall.

=== Foundation ===
The building had a mixture of foundation designs. Most of the building rested on pilings, which were made of wood and supported most of the building's weight. The underlying earth was made of clay, which varied greatly in texture and strength. The clay could carry loads of 2,500 to 4,000 pounds per square foot (12,000 to 20,000 kg/m^{2}), so to prevent uneven settlement, the foundations distributed structural loads evenly across the site. The use of pilings, a technology endorsed by Smith, contrasted with typical buildings in downtown Chicago of the time, which were built on a bed of concrete laid onto the clay. Smith's method involved drilling wooden piles until they reached hard clay or rock, then cutting off the tops of the piles above the lake's water level. The pilings were then topped by a grillage made of timbers, which in turn was topped by layers of concrete and I-beams. The bases of the superstructure's columns were installed atop the grillages.

Under the western boundary, there was a party wall consisting of caissons extending down to the underlying hardpan; the caissons were the first to be used in Chicago. Created by backfilling deep wells with concrete, the caissons extended to the underlying bedrock, which at some places dipped to a depth of 75 feet (23 m). The caissons measured 5 to 6 1/3 feet (1.5 to 1.9 m) across at their bases and 6 1/2 to 8 feet (2.0 to 2.4 m) across at their tops. The caissons were a refinement of previous foundation designs that Adler & Sullivan had contemplated for the unbuilt Fraternity Temple and the piles used in the Schiller Building.

=== Interior ===
The building had two banks of five elevators each, located at the center of the building. The elevators had cast-bronze grilles with organic and geometric motifs, such as floral and seed shapes. There were two sets of double iron stairs between the fourth and thirteenth floors. The stairs had mahogany rails and white marble treads, along with ironwork manufactured by the Winslow Brothers Company. As built, the corridors all had mosaic-tile floors and marble wainscoting. The building's superstructure used a fireproof steel frame.

==== Trading room ====
The trading floor

The grandest space in the building was its double-height trading room, located in the Art Institute of Chicago's museum building since 1977. It originally occupied the second story and was used by the Chicago Stock Exchange. The room is variously cited as measuring 64 by 81 feet (20 by 25 m), 60 by 100 feet (18 by 30 m), 70 by 100 feet (21 by 30 m), or 75 by 100 feet (23 by 30 m) across. The room has green and gold decorations, painted in 52 distinct colors. (Note: Another source cites a figure of 55 distinct colors.) These decorations have foliate motifs stenciled onto them. Other woods, along with gold leaf, are also used throughout the room. Healy and Millet, who were also responsible for the Schiller Theater, Auditorium Theatre, and World's Columbian Exposition decorations, oversaw the trading room's decorations.

The Art Institute of Chicago could not ascertain the floor's original material, but the room had a marble floor during the Stock Exchange Building's final years. After the room was relocated, the Art Institute added a wooden floor, based on correspondence in which Sullivan referenced an oak floor. The walls originally had backboards, and the exit signs were cast bronze with red letters. As originally built, the eastern wall adjoined the LaSalle Street windows. Additional windows faced south toward the alley. There was also a callers' rostrum to the north, along with seats for 150 people in its original configuration. Four columns create a gallery on the room's western border. The gallery initially contained a coatroom, sitting room, and secretary's offices.

The ceiling is cited as measuring 27 feet (8.2 m) high or 30 feet (9.1 m) high. As built, it was decorated in a Moresque style and painted sea green. There are red, gold, and green friezes on the ceiling, decorated with monograms containing the initials "CSE". The ceiling is supported by four octagonal Siena marble pillars with gilded capitals. The pillars measure 20 inches (510 mm) wide on each face, and originally supported seven concealed trusses spanning the room. Four trusses formed a rectangle above the four octagonal pillars, while the other three trusses spanned west–east between the longer north–south sides of the rectangle. The locations of the former trusses are denoted by the decorations on the ceiling. The columns and trusses helped distribute weight from the upper stories around the room. The ceiling also has skylights embedded into it, divided into more than 400 panels. Sullivan later repeated some of the trading room's decorative features, including the use of windows on two sides, in the National Farmers' Bank of Owatonna in Owatonna, Minnesota.

==== Other interior spaces ====
Past the main entrance was a small entrance vestibule with a mosaic-clad vaulted ceiling. The lobby was originally planned with a double-height barrel-vaulted ceiling. As built, two staircases connected the lobby to the trading room on the second floor. The staircases, which continued to the third floor and had elaborate iron balusters, originally obstructed the lobby ceiling. By the 1960s, the staircases had been removed, and the lobby had been re-clad in travertine marble; part of the ceiling was re-exposed. There were also shops on the ground floor. Grilles at the first and second floor had ornamental cast iron panels.

The upper floors were devoted to offices, which flanked a central corridor in both the main section of the building and its rear wings. When the building was completed, it was divided into 400 or 480 offices. This made it Adler and Sullivan's largest commission since the Auditorium Building. The offices were built with flexible partitions, allowing the interior spaces to be reorganized as needed. Elevator grilles on the third through thirteenth floors were made of iron with cast-bronze T-plates, painted dark blue and black. The basement had the building's power plant, which had four boilers, three compound engines for the building's electric lights, an engine for the elevators, and air compressors for removing sewage. By the first decade of the 20th century, the basement and sub-basement had bank vaults.

== History ==
=== Development ===
Site map of the block; the building was located at the northeast (top right) edge

The Chicago Stock Exchange was established in 1882 and moved to a building at Monroe and Dearborn streets (now the Inland Steel Building site) in 1890. Within a few years, it was looking to relocate again. By June 1892, the stock exchange's building committee was discussing acquiring the Peck family's site at the southwest corner of LaSalle and Washington streets. Initially, the exchange sought only the Peck property, which measured 100 by 100 feet (30 by 30 m) across and was occupied by the Western Union Building. The Peck family subsequently leased a neighboring property from the Fuller family, nearly doubling the land area. The Peck estate made an offer to the exchange in December 1892, promising a 100-by-180-foot (30 by 55 m) plot for a nominal fee of $1 per year. (Note: Equivalent to $32 in 2025) Under this deal, the exchange was to occupy a trading room on the new building's second floor, measuring 60 by 80 feet (18 by 24 m) across. The Peck estate also agreed to name the new building for the exchange. The Peck family hoped that the exchange's presence would attract brokerage tenants to the building. A construction permit was issued the next month.

To fund the building's construction, the Chicago Stock Exchange more than doubled its annual membership fees from $700 to $1,500. (Note: Equivalent to an increase from $22,403 to $48,007 in 2025) Local firm Adler & Sullivan prepared plans for the building, which were announced in February 1893; the firm continued working on the design for several months, with financial assistance from Ferdinand Peck of the Peck estate. The New York Life Company provided a $600,000 mortgage loan to help fund construction. (Note: Equivalent to $20 million in 2025) The foundations were built before the Western Union Building had been fully demolished. The previous building took six weeks to demolish; during that process, part of the building collapsed on several workers. A retaining wall was built on the site's southern boundary, adjoining the Oriental Building, and water was extracted from the underlying clay to reduce the possibility of settlement. Caissons were used on the site's western boundary to prevent vibrations in the Herald building, but the rest of the foundation was constructed by driving piles into the ground, which caused the facade of the Oriental Building to settle and crack.

The foundations were completed in July 1893, and Falkenau & Co. was hired as the project's general contractor that month. Work on the superstructure began on August 15. While the building's entrance arch was being constructed, Daniel F. Criller, the owner of the previous Chicago Stock Exchange building at Monroe and Dearborn, obtained an injunction preventing the new building from being named the Chicago Stock Exchange Building. The injunction was lifted the next month, and the roof was complete by December 29. Various strikes among laborers delayed the installation of finishes, and the 1893 United Kingdom miners' strike also delayed deliveries of enamel brick. By the following February, the steel frame was complete, and the restaurant, cafe, and several offices had been leased out; workers were completing the interior finishes. That month, physical conflicts arose between unionized and non-unionized laborers working on the building. To compensate for delays caused by strikes, laborers had to continue their work through the middle at night, in temperatures that sometimes dropped below 0 °F (−18 °C).

=== Usage ===
==== 1894–1907: Early years ====
The Chicago Stock Exchange moved in on April 30, 1894.

The building was dedicated on April 30, 1894; it ultimately cost around $1.1 million (Note: Equivalent to $35.2 million in 2025) or $1.3 million. (Note: Equivalent to $41.6 million in 2025) The structure had been budgeted at $1.8 million, (Note: Equivalent to $57.6 million in 2025) but the Panic of 1893 had resulted in lower-than-expected costs, as contractors had submitted lower bids for various parts of the project. Architectural fees from the development of the Stock Exchange and Guaranty buildings helped keep Adler & Sullivan solvent after the Panic of 1893, since only the firm's largest projects provided sufficient income for the firm. Although the firm had designed 40 buildings following the completion of the Auditorium Building, they completed only two buildings together after 1893: the Chicago Stock Exchange Building, and the Guaranty Building in Buffalo, New York.

Initially, the Stock Exchange held a 15-year lease on the building's trading room. Other early tenants included the Title Guarantee and Trust Company, as well as the Postal Telegraph Company, which had to install 250 miles (400 km) of wiring for its offices there in 1895. The Peck family originally owned the building and the northernmost 100 feet (30 m) of the site, while they leased the southern 80 feet (24 m) of the site from the Fuller family. In June 1898, the Pecks sold the building, the northern parcel, and the lease on the southern parcel to the family of Cyrus McCormick as part of a $2.5 million transaction involving several properties. The McCormick family initially gave the building to the trustees of their estate before retaking ownership in 1900.

The Chicago Stock Exchange was already considering constructing another building by 1902, even though its lease did not expire for six years. The exchange incorporated the Chicago Stock Exchange Building Company in 1904 to develop a new building. By then, the existing structure at LaSalle Street was no longer physically near Chicago's financial center, and the exchange was considering move to Jackson Boulevard. Following a fire at the Stock Exchange Building in 1905, inspectors found that the standpipes for the fire suppression system were completely defective, requiring their replacement.

==== 1908–1967: After the Stock Exchange's relocation ====
The Stock Exchange moved out of the building in 1908, relocating to the Rookery Building at LaSalle and Adams streets. The move came amid a wider-scale relocation of the city's financial center to Monroe Street, stranding the Stock Exchange even at its new location. The Foreman Brothers Bank moved into the trading room that September. The bank gutted the trading room except for the viewing gallery, repainted the space, and added furnishings; these changes damaged the room's architecture. The building continued to be known as the Chicago Stock Exchange Building, even after the exchange closed and merged with the Midwest Stock Exchange. The Foreman Brothers Bank grew rapidly and had to lease additional office space in the building.

Additional tenants during the early 20th century included the Bureau of War Risk Insurance, the National Transportation Institute, a Horn & Hardart automat, and federal financial company Fannie Mae. Foreman Brothers Bank vacated the former trading room in 1929, and that space went unused for about a decade. Foreman Brothers Bank's relocation also freed up ten storefronts, of which six had been leased within a year. By then, eighty-five to ninety percent of the office space was occupied. Bell Savings and Loan Bank leased the trading room in 1939 and added a dropped ceiling about 10 feet (3.0 m) above the floor. The McCormick estate continued to own and manage the building for a half-century until 1957, when the building was sold to Sudler & Co. The McCormick family retained an office at the building,

By the 1960s, the building was known as 30 North LaSalle Street, and it was one of several buildings in downtown Chicago managed by Sudler & Co. The firm rented out the offices to tenants who were enticed by the building's architecture. The offices were gradually being renovated as they were leased to new tenants. The stock exchange's former boardroom, long since remodeled, had been leased to the United Service Organizations' Chicago center, which moved in during 1965. Also in 1965, Sudler & Co. hired Daniel Brenner to restore Sullivan's original lobby. The renovation was completed by the next year; at that point, Sudler & Co. had spent $500,000 renovating the building during the decade. (Note: Equivalent to $3.8 million in 2025) By then, the Chicago government was looking to encourage redevelopment of the Loop. Several structures, such as Adler & Sullivan's Garrick Theatre, had already been demolished, and other buildings were planned to be redeveloped.

=== Demise ===
The development rights for the Stock Exchange Building and the property immediately to the west were purchased in 1968 by the Jupiter Corporation, led by Edward Ross and Jerrold Wexler. Since the site's zoning allowed a structure of up to 45 stories, Ross and Wexler wished to tear down the building to make way for a new office block. The Stock Exchange Building was earning only $150,000 a year in rental income, (Note: Equivalent to $1.0 million in 2025) while the new building was expected to generate several times as much revenue. In 1969, a group of businessmen formed the 30 North LaSalle Partnership, led by Jerome Whiston, which acquired an option to buy it for $7 million. (Note: Equivalent to $47.1 million in 2025) The building was Sullivan's only surviving steel-framed office design in the city, but it had become dilapidated.

==== Landmark efforts ====
The Commission on Chicago Landmarks had been formed in 1968 to enforce the city's landmarks law, superseding an advisory commission whose designations could not legally be enforced. The Stock Exchange Building was one of the first buildings the commission examined for preservation. The owners of most of these buildings, including the Stock Exchange Building, objected to the designations, requiring additional action from the Chicago City Council. At the time, landmarks laws such as Chicago's generally did not prevent demolition of historical buildings for which continued operation was economically infeasible. There were also concerns that, if a building was designated as a landmark over its owner's opposition, a landmarks law could be declared unconstitutional under US law.

The Commission on Chicago Landmarks voted 5–4 to recommend city landmark status for the building, and it scheduled a hearing for January 1970 regarding the proposed designation. Preservationists hoped that the landmarks law would be able to save the building and began devising ways to reuse it. While preservationists testified in support of the building's conservation, Whiston's group claimed that the building had lost its historical significance and was economically unviable; the owners' attorneys also claimed the landmark designation would reduce the site's value. A committee of the Chicago City Council ultimately rejected the designation in June 1970. The full council overwhelmingly rejected the designation soon afterward, since the city could not raise $7 million to match the developers' purchase price. The council also rejected a proposal to sell municipal bonds to fund a purchase of the building.

30 North LaSalle Partnership bought the property in January 1971 and, soon after, announced plans to begin demolition. The Commission on Chicago Landmarks asked the City Council reconsider the building's landmark designation that February, but the council rejected this request as well. The next month, Mayor Richard Daley created a committee to study the building and ordered that no demolition permit be issued until the committee's report was issued. A group of preservation groups formed the Landmarks Preservation Council to coordinate preservation efforts. The Commission on Chicago Landmarks also asked the building's owners to allow a landmark designation and later voted again to recommend designation. Harry Weese drew up plans to save the building by integrating it with a 60-story office tower on the adjacent site. Other proposals to save the building included designating it as an Illinois State Historic Site and selling the site's development rights to fund the building's purchase. A federal committee visited Chicago that July to discuss the building's preservation, and Daley's commission also recommended that the building be sold for preservation, but no buyer was ever found.

==== Demolition and replacement ====
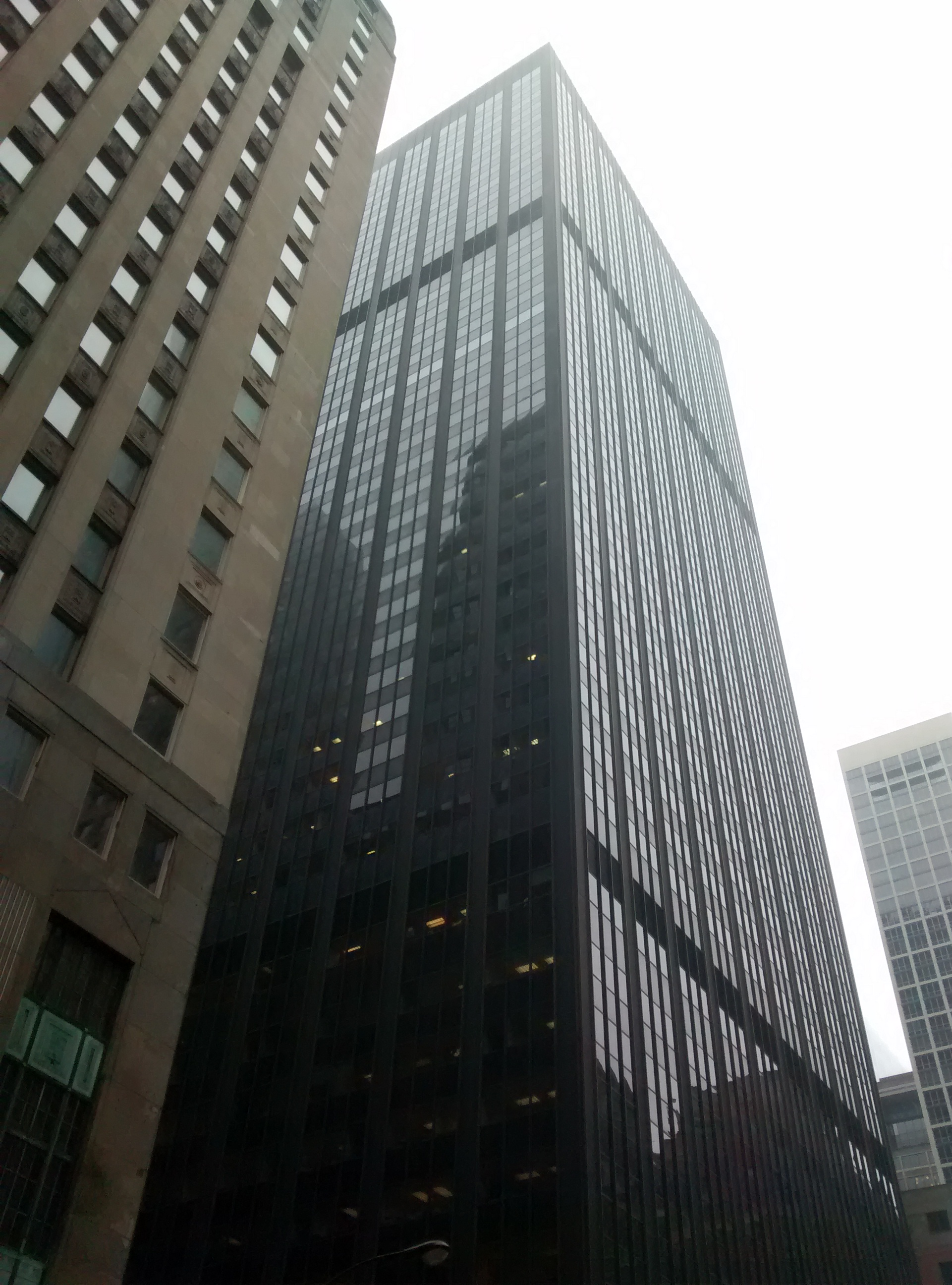
30 North LaSalle, the tower that replaced the Stock Exchange Building

A demolition permit was issued on October 1, 1971. The demolition permit was appealed to the Supreme Court of Illinois, the state's highest court, which rejected the appeal on October 19. Immediately afterward, wrecking crews arrived on site, and the four remaining tenants were forced to move out; demolition began that month. Preservationist Richard Nickel and architect John Vinci catalogued the building before its demolition, and Nickel took pictures of the building while it was being demolished. Early on in the demolition process, the developers agreed to allow museums to salvage elements such as the main entrance arch and trading room. Nickel made several trips inside the building to retrieve decorations. The University of Illinois Chicago, which had offered to buy the top floor's facade and the cornice, had to drop its offer after the cost of these elements increased 400%.

Even as the Stock Exchange Building was being demolished, architectural guides brought groups there on tours of downtown Chicago. While taking apart the building's vault, demolition workers discovered papers belonging to businessman Cyrus McCormick and other prominent Chicago families. A section of the building collapsed in March 7, 1972, injuring passersby. Nickel was retrieving additional decorations on April 13, 1972, when another part of the structure collapsed while he was inside. Nickel's body, crushed by the weight of the debris, fell to the basement and was not found for weeks.

After the Stock Exchange Building was demolished, the site became the 30 North LaSalle office tower, work on which began in October 1972. Local architecture firms were unwilling to help redevelop the site of the Stock Exchange Building. Ultimately, the office tower's developers hired an out-of-town architect, Thomas Stanley of Dallas. One of the office tower's developers likened the fight over the landmark designation to the military dictatorship of Chile's nationalization of American companies. The office building was topped out in October 1973 and initially had trouble obtaining tenants. After a half-century as an office building, the new 30 North LaSalle became apartments in the 2020s.

== Impact and legacy ==
=== Preservation ===
The Stock Exchange Building's destruction was symbolically likened to that of New York's original Pennsylvania Station. American preservationists regarded the Stock Exchange Building as a major loss magnified by Nickel's death. The Stock Exchange Building was Adler & Sullivan's second Chicago skyscraper in a decade to be demolished, after the Schiller Building. Many of Sullivan's other works met a similar fate. Though Sullivan ultimately executed 200 designs during his lifetime, only about three dozen survived into the late 20th century.

The demolition of the Stock Exchange Building helped spur modern preservation movements in Chicago. Vinci said that, because of the demolition, Chicagoans became involved in historic preservation much earlier than other cities' residents. The Landmarks Preservation Council boosted its efforts to save the city's other historical buildings and later broadened its scope to include historic sites statewide. Historic preservation in Chicago became a politically salient issue; these efforts, initially the domain of affluent white residents, had expanded to include a wider range of demographics by the 1990s. Nickel became a martyr for Chicago's preservation movement, and his death inspired preservationists to successfully advocate for stronger protections in the city's landmarks laws.

The building's demolition coincided with the growth of the American architectural salvage industry. Though pieces of previous buildings, such as Pennsylvania Station, had been sent to landfills, decorations from the Stock Exchange Building were dispersed far and wide. The salvage industry continued to grow after the building's destruction. Preservation magazine wrote in 2000 that "today, no wrecker's ball would touch the Chicago Stock Exchange until salvagers had pried loose every last sconce and batten".

==== Arch and trading room ====
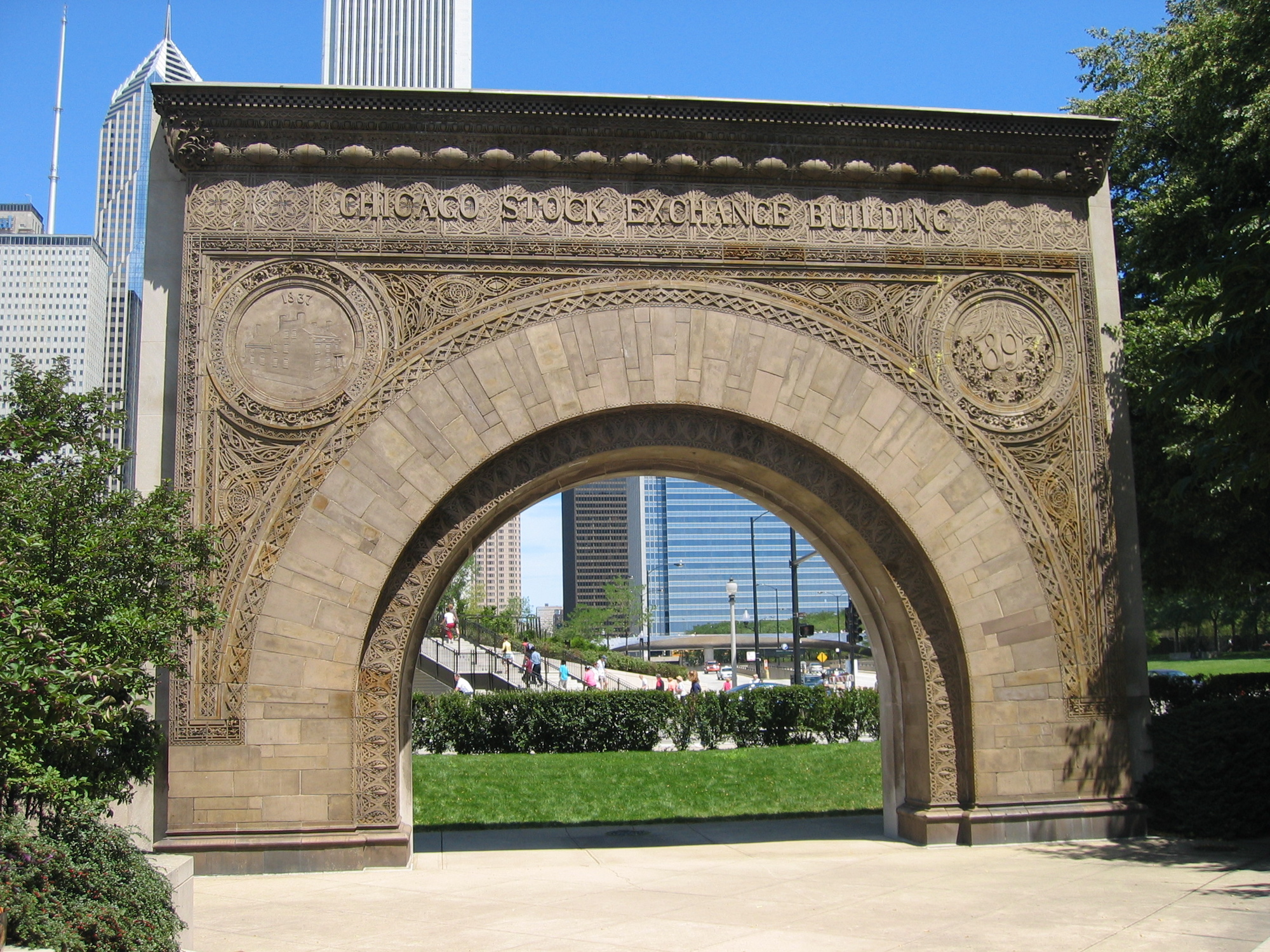
The Stock Exchange Building's trading room and its entrance arch (pictured) were saved by the Art Institute of Chicago.

The Stock Exchange Building's trading room and entrance arch were saved by a local museum, the Art Institute of Chicago. New York City's Metropolitan Museum of Art originally wanted the arch, but Chicago leaders lobbied to keep it in Chicago. At Vinci's advice, the institute moved the entire trading room as well, even though this required the museum to take out $1 million in insurance; (Note: Equivalent to $6.1 million in 2025) the museum paid the demolition contractor another $35,000 to keep the decorations intact. (Note: Equivalent to $213,000 in 2025) In 1974, the Walter E. Heller Foundation donated $520,000 (Note: Equivalent to $2.6 million in 2025) to fund the reinstallation of the trading room and arch as part of the Art Institute Building's expansion. The trading room was moved to the Art Institute's McKinlock Memorial Wing, where it was reassembled by Vinci-Kenney Architects. The reconstruction was carried out using Nickel's photographs. Some of the surviving decorations, such as friezes and capitals, were reused, but the trading room was in such poor shape that many decorative elements were instead replicated.

The rebuilt trading room was dedicated in April 1977, having cost $700,000 to restore. (Note: Equivalent to $2.9 million in 2025) The trading room functioned as a reception room and lounge, surrounded by a glass corridor designed by architectural firm SOM. The room was oriented with its windows facing east, similar to its original alignment. The arch was preserved as a standalone structure at Monroe Street and Columbus Drive, where Walter Netsch of SOM designed a rear facade to the arch, facing north toward Monroe Street. The rear facade is blank, and the arch itself does not span any paths. The arch was retrospectively described by the American Institute of Architects as "the Wailing Wall of Chicago's preservation movement", and a Chicago Tribune writer likened the trading room to a memorial for Richard Nickel. Both the arch and trading room are part of the Ernest R. Graham Study Center for Architectural Drawings.

Over the years, the relocated trading room has hosted events such as corporate meetings and weddings. The arch was covered for protection during a renovation of the Art Institute Building's modern wing in the 2000s. A renovation of the Art Institute Building was announced in 2024, prompting concerns that the room would have to be relocated. This prompted Preservation Chicago to place the trading room on its 7 Most Endangered list for 2026.

==== Other design elements ====
Two flights of stairs were salvaged by the Metropolitan Museum of Art.

Philanthropist Seymour Persky relocated some of the building's elevator grilles to the James Charnley House on the Near North Side when the Stock Exchange Building was renovated in the 1960s. After the redevelopment was announced (but before demolition had begun), decorations such as balusters, doorknobs, and lamps were removed. Photojournalist Richard Cahan said that, in light of Nickel's death, pieces of the building were seen as "kind of like blood money" for some time. Even the demolition contractor changed his attitude toward the decorations after Nickel died, storing them in a scrapyard in South Chicago, until they could be relocated. By the 1990s, items such as railings, door handles, and terracotta blocks were also being sold to private collectors. Over the years, the decorations have been resold for progressively higher prices; in 2008, a 14-foot (4.3 m) section of the elevator cabs was sold to the Seattle Art Museum for about $600,000.

Some pieces of the building have been given to museums. Grillwork was acquired by the University of Southern California, Yale School of Architecture, Art Institute of Chicago, and Chicago Historical Society. The Art Institute's Department of Architecture preserves several smaller fragments such as balusters, kick plates, and mail slots. Two flights of the Chicago Stock Exchange Building's staircases were acquired by the Metropolitan Museum, which installed them in the American Wing of its Fifth Avenue building in 1980. The staircases at the Met, located on the wing's east wall, lead to a balcony with exhibits. Other design elements were also salvaged by the Met, including a baluster. The Chicago Architecture Center salvaged additional terracotta and balusters from the building, and a piece of the cornice was reassembled at St. Ignatius College Prep. St. Louis's City Museum saved another piece of cornice, a grille, and part of the stair.

=== Reception ===
When the building was completed, the Chicago Daily Tribune called it "in some respects the finest of all the great buildings in Chicago", in that its design details conformed with the prevailing architectural tastes of the time. The Clay Record called the building "one of the most complete of its kind ever put up", despite the relatively small amounts of material used, compared with other later buildings constructed contemporaneously. Conversely, the design of the lowest three stories was criticized for its proportions, since the presence of the trading room behind the second and third stories was not readily apparent.

Retrospectively, the Chicago Tribune wrote that the 1960s changes had given the building "a modern interior yet preserv[ed] the heritage of the past". The arch was described by The Birmingham News as creating "an unerring sense of proportion and a grandeur lacking in less worthy buildings". The Blade of Toledo, Ohio, wrote that the building's trading room was "a model of elegance and style". Sullivan biographer Hugh Morrison wrote that the building "offers little of interest except in the foundations", stating that the building's design did not try to introduce "either structural symbolism or decorative adornment". Historian Robert Twombly wrote that other historians likened the plain upper facade to the Carson Pirie Scott Building or to mid-century modern facades.

When the building was set for demolition in the early 1970s, historian Paul Sprague said the building represented an architectural advance that "all mankind will look back on for all time", and Richard Bennett of the American Institute of Architects' Chicago chapter called it "an important chapter in Chicago history and the industrial revolution". Vinci wrote that it had been "a major contribution to the Chicago school of architecture", Country Life magazine wrote that the building's design represented a transitional period in Sullivan's work, where the horizontal divisions of Sullivan's previous work were being replaced by vertical divisions. Blair Kamin wrote in 2006 that the building had been "a masterful turn-of-the-century office building" from Adler & Sullivan.

==== Demolition and preservation commentary ====
Jane Holtz Kay wrote that the demolition could have been averted "if the public's architectural awareness were raised by better press coverage of our built world". Wolf Von Eckardt wrote that "the story of the building's demise is full of frightening ironies", saying the entire building could have been saved for less than what it cost to preserve some design elements. The Wall Street Journal called the building the most prominent of Chicago's notable structures "destroyed in the name of Progress". In 1988, Paul Gapp remarked, "No truly great building has been constructed on downtown LaSalle Street for more than 50 years, although more than a few good ones (including Louis Sullivan's magnificent Chicago Stock Exchange) have been torn down." Kamin wrote in 2007 that "everybody recognizes what a mistake [the Stock Exchange Building's demolition] was", and that further awareness of Sullivan's work had prompted preservation efforts for his remaining buildings. In 2019, Reader magazine wrote that the building had been "one of the masterpieces of modernist architecture" and that the arch was akin to a tombstone.

Architectural critic Ada Louise Huxtable wrote that the dispersal and relocation of the building's architectural details was "the kind of false conscience balm that can only be called stupid, willful, or otherwise". After the trading room and arch were moved, Building Design wrote that the trading room and archway" have undergone a remarkable resurrection", and Paul Goldberger praised the workmanship of the trading room's restoration. Peter Jacobi of The Christian Science Monitor called the room "a gem of architecture" in part because of its careful reconstruction, and he said the relocated arch "framed" the skyline. Conversely, multiple commentators criticized the setting of the arch and trading room. Goldberger and The Kansas City Star art critic Donald Hoffmann wrote that the arch was particularly poorly integrated, since it faced the museum campus rather than the street. Hoffmann regarded the trading room as barn-like and sterile, describing it as an inauthentic period room.

=== Exhibits, media, and landmark designations ===
Ralph M. Line documented the building in the 1950s as part of a photographic survey of Sullivan's work, and the building was also documented as part of the Historic American Buildings Survey in the 1960s. It has also been depicted in exhibits, such as a 1946 showcase of Sullivan's work at Chicago's Institute of Modern Art, a 1966 traveling exhibit by the Smithsonian Institution, and a 1982 exhibit at the Chicago Architecture Center. After the building's demolition, some decorations were exhibited at the Southern Illinois University Edwardsville in 1976, and an elevator cab was reassembled for a traveling exhibition in the late 1980s. The building's demolition was also documented in a short film made for a 1999 exhibit at the Chicago Cultural Center. The Stock Exchange Building and Sullivan's other demolished work were also the subjects of a 2022 exhibit at the Driehaus Museum.

The Stock Exchange Building was briefly added to the National Register of Historic Places in 1970. This designation did not protect the building from demolition, and the building was deleted from the register in December 1971 after demolition began. The building was also designated as a Chicago Landmark in the 1960s, under the first Chicago Historical Landmarks Commission, as an advisory-only action. It was one of several Adler & Sullivan buildings designated as city landmarks,along with the Auditorium Building, Carson Pirie Scott Building, and the James Charnley House. However, the building never received legal landmark protection from the city; Huxtable called it a "non-landmark landmark".

== See also ==
- National Register of Historic Places listings in Central Chicago
- List of Chicago Landmarks
