= Charnley–Norwood House =

House in Ocean Springs, Mississippi

Coordinates: 30°23′44″N 88°48′32″W

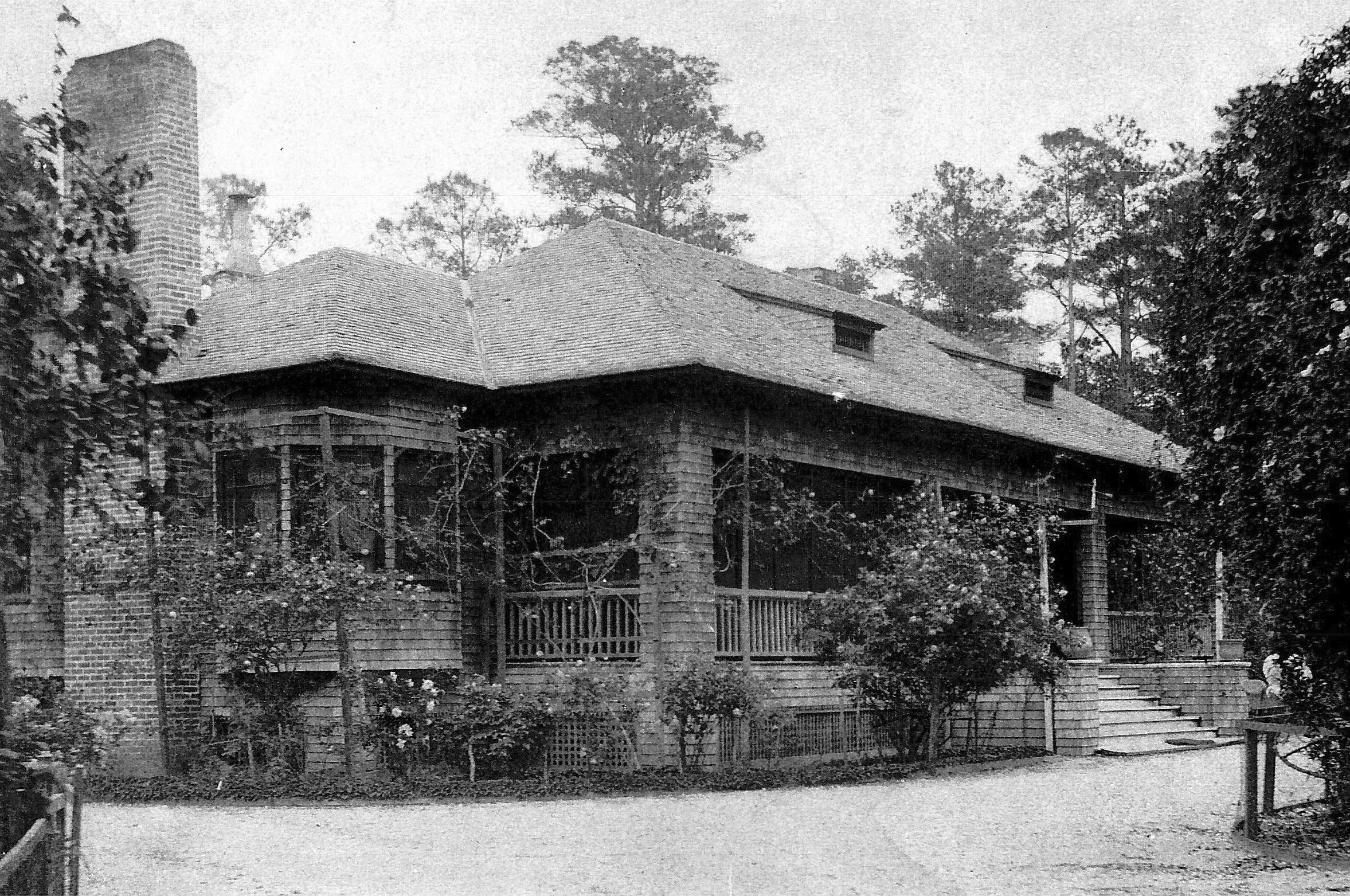
Charnley–Norwood House, circa 1910

The Charnley–Norwood House is a summer (winter) cottage designed by architects Louis Sullivan and Frank Lloyd Wright in 1890 on the Mississippi Gulf Coast in Ocean Springs, Mississippi. The home was built as a vacation residence for James Charnley, a wealthy Chicago lumber baron, and its style represents an important change in American residential architecture known as Prairie School.

== History ==
In 1890, Louis Sullivan, of Adler & Sullivan architecture firm in Chicago, designed the Charnley–Norwood House as a summer cottage for his friend James Charnley. Frank Lloyd Wright was a young draftsman in Sullivan's office at the time, but there is little evidence to suggest that Wright actually had a hand in the making of the 3,000 square foot cottage. Wright never once visited the site. In his autobiography, Sullivan recalls quickly designing the "two shacks" himself in March 1890, then the prepared plans were given to a local carpenter to construct. Beyond its experimental residential design, the Charnley–Norwood House stands out because of its association with two of America's greatest architects – Louis Sullivan, known as the "father of the skyscraper," and Frank Lloyd Wright, often called the "father of modern architecture."

Sullivan discovered the area while vacationing in New Orleans. He ran into wealthy friends, the Charnleys, who urged him to visit the "coastal paradise" they had recently explored. Ocean Springs, Mississippi was only a small village at the time, and provided a peaceful retreat from the hustle and bustle of Chicago. Sullivan's writings from the period describe the property as "[a] stately forest of amazing beauty… arranged as though by the hand of an unseen poet. Ah, what a delight, what luxury of peace within the velvety caressing air… the odor of the waters and the pines." Sullivan and Charnley purchased adjoining gulf-side properties in Ocean Springs, MS to construct their two vacation residences.

In 1895, Charnley sold the property to fellow Chicago businessman Frederick W. Norwood. Norwood's business operations were based near Brookhaven, MS, where he dealt in general merchandise as well as lumber. In 1897, the main house burned to the ground, but Sullivan modified and rebuilt it to nearly the same design. During the Norwoods' time in the home, Mrs. Norwood had a garden of Bon Silene roses planted out front. The blush-pink ruffled petals of these roses added to the charm of the property and provided the name the Norwoods used to refer to the estate, "Bon Silene."

Upon their construction, the Charnley–Norwood House and Sullivan Bungalow were two of only a few homes near the Eastern Beach of Biloxi Bay. The area was relatively undeveloped at the time and surrounded by wood and wetland. The Charnley–Norwood House is currently neighbored by a strip of beachfront homes along East Beach Drive in Ocean Springs, MS.

== Hurricane Katrina restoration ==
In 2005, Hurricane Katrina's massive storm surge destroyed Sullivan's cottage and severely damaged the Charnley–Norwood House and guest cottage. Although the main house was knocked off its piers and moved during the storm, the building survived. With one side completely collapsed and the porch washed away, the house sat in a state of disarray. The brick foundation piers pierced through the floor in the front portion of the home where the structure landed after being floated by floodwaters. Volunteers salvaged many pieces of the buildings, but due to high costs, two years passed before any significant progress could be made.

The Mississippi Department of Archives and History (MDAH) and the Mississippi Department of Marine Resources (MDMR) partnered to fund the $2.3 million acquisition and restoration project. Beginning in the spring of 2008, MDAH performed stabilization work on the home. In 2011, MDMR purchased the house and property for $1.4 million through the federal Coastal Impact Assistance Program (CIAP). MDAH contributed $300,000. Contractor J.O. Collins completed the home restoration under the supervision of Albert and Associates Architects and the Mississippi Department of Archives and History Gulf Coast Field Office staff.

== Present day ==
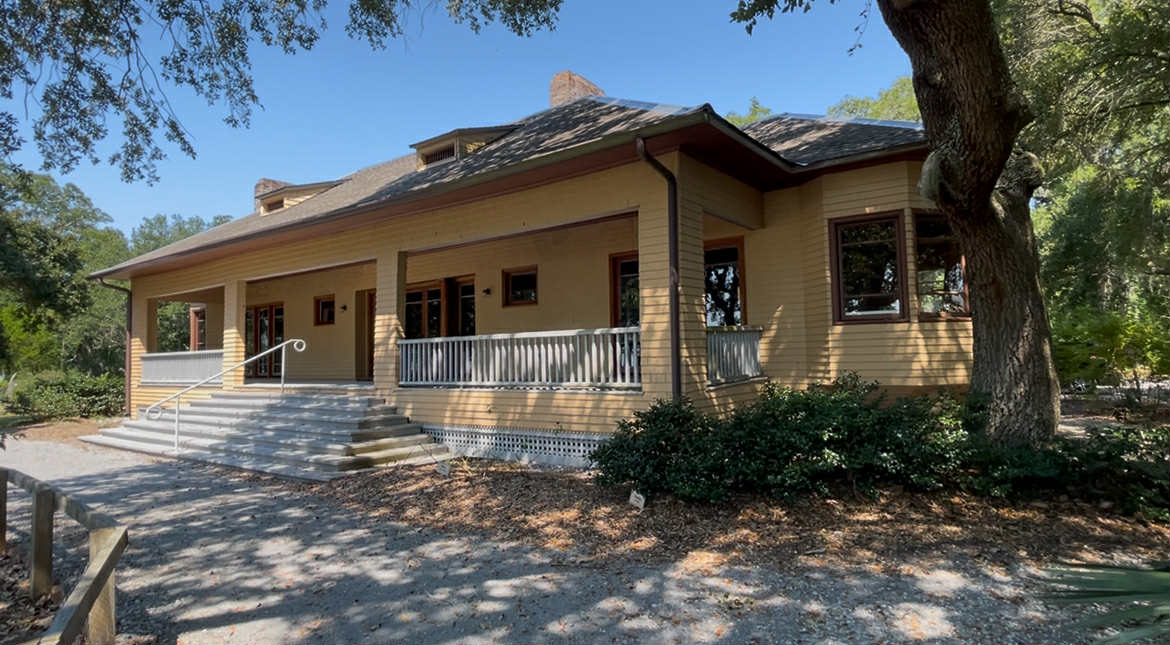
The outside of the Charnley–Norwood House in September 2025

During his lifetime, Frank Lloyd Wright designed only four homes in the state of Mississippi. Two of the four have been destroyed by hurricanes: the Welbie L. Fuller Residence, Pass Christian; and Louis Sullivan Bungalow, Ocean Springs,. Fountainhead in Jackson and Charnley-Norwood in Ocean Springs remain. Of these two, Charnley-Norwood is the only home that is open to the public. It is managed as part of the Mississippi Gulf Coast National Heritage Area.

== Design ==
The Charnley–Norwood House Complex contains the main house as well as an octagonal guest cottage. The home sits on an acre of beachfront property at 509 East Beach Drive in Ocean Springs, MS, 39564.

The design of the homes and cottage differ significantly from Victorian architecture of the era. The T-shape bungalow style incorporates horizontal design, rooms that flow from one into the next, natural materials and large glass windows throughout. The interior floors, walls and ceilings of the Charnley–Norwood House are constructed of local heart and curly pine, while the exterior walls are clad using wood shingles. To accommodate residents during the muggy and hot Mississippi summers, the home's design efficiently utilizes large roof overhangs and covered porches at the south, west, and east sides of the house provide protection from the harsh, southern sun, while offering opportunities to enjoy the serene setting of the home. Numerous doors and operable windows are arranged along the exterior of the house to efficiently distribute both onshore and offshore breezes to cool the residence. Fireplaces located in each of the bedrooms, entry hall, and dining room supply warmth for the cooler winter temperatures.

Although the style is strikingly different from typical 19th century residential architecture, the forms used for the Charnley–Norwood House later became the hallmarks of modern architecture. The home represents a watershed in residential design, offering historians insight into the evolutionary forces that powerfully reshaped 20th century American residential architecture.
