= Dexter Building =

Building in Chicago, Illinois

Coordinates: 41°52′25″N 87°37′34″W

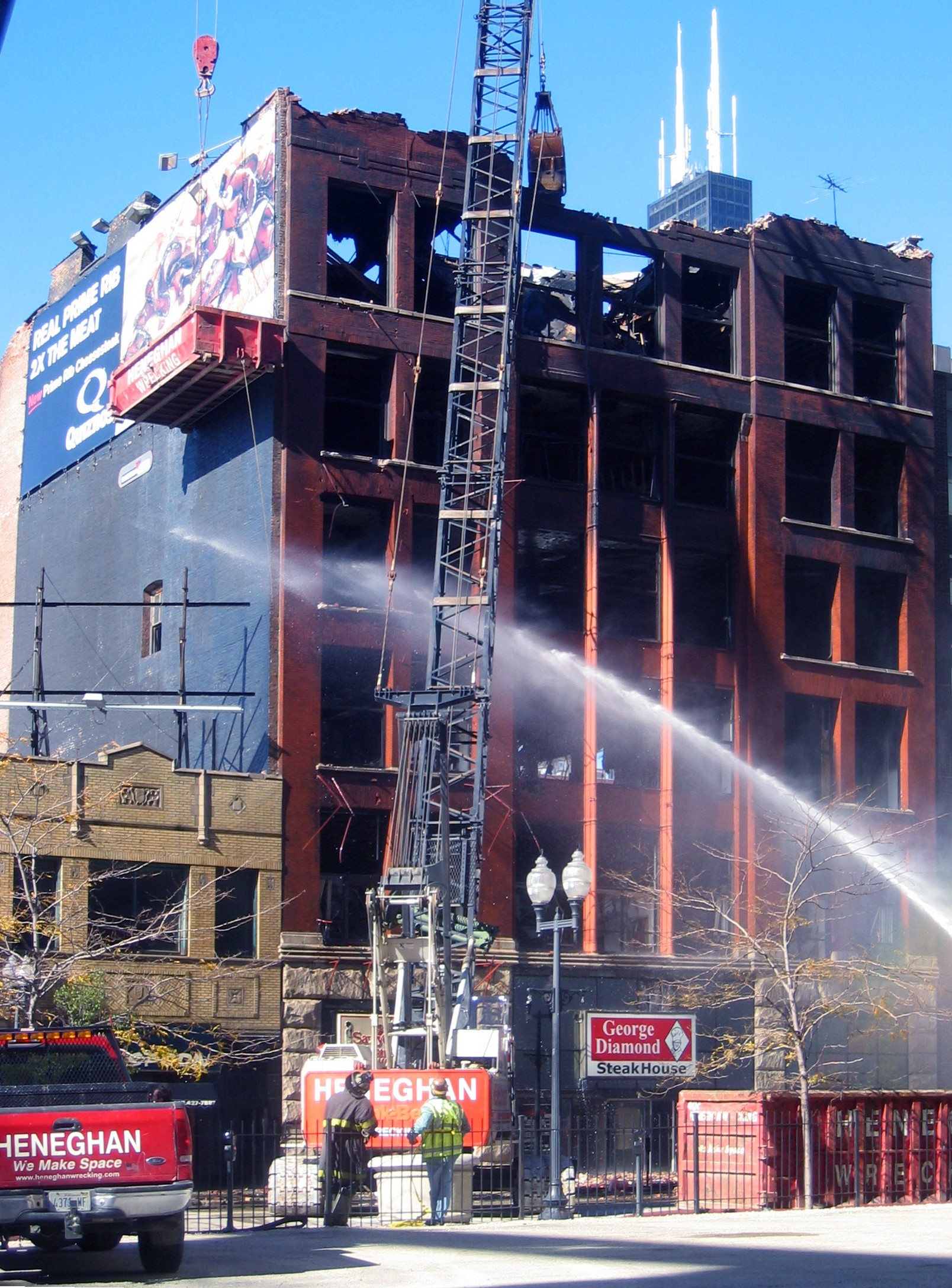
- The Dexter Building under demolition following the fire in 2006
- Interactive map of the Dexter Building area

General information
- Location: Chicago, Illinois, United States
- Opened: 1887
- Demolished: 2006

Design and construction
- Architects: Dankmar Adler and Louis Sullivan

The Dexter Building was located at 630 South Wabash Avenue, in the South Loop area of Chicago, Illinois. The building was designed by the firm of Dankmar Adler and Louis Sullivan, and built in 1887. Prior to its destruction in a 2006 fire, it was one of the earliest surviving Louis Sullivan buildings, and was considered a precursor of the nearby Auditorium Building. It was designated as a Chicago Landmark in 1996 and was described by the Landmarks Division of the City of Chicago Department of Planning and Development as an "irreplaceable link in the chain of work of one of the nation's most important architectural partnerships". It was distinctive in its use of exterior perforated girders, prefiguring designs of seven decades later.

== History ==
Architects Dankmar Adler and Louis Sullivan designed the Wirt Dexter Building as a warehouse and a furniture store for Wirt Dexter Walker, a prestigious lawyer in 1887, twelve years before his death. This building housed many businesses all around the years, from 1967 it was the home of the George Diamond Steak House, and the upper floors later housed the Sawyer Secretarial College.

== Fire ==
On October 24, 2006, workmen were cutting up a boiler in the basement for scrapping with acetylene torches that sparked a large fire. The fire was allowed to get out of control and gutted the building. At its peak, the fire, which started in the basement at around 3 pm, was a five-alarm fire, the Chicago Fire Department's highest level of alert, with over 250 firefighters responding. Following the fire, the surviving shell of the building was too unstable to save and was demolished. At the time of the fire there was no insurance on the building.

== In popular culture ==
The Wirt Dexter Building can be seen in the near background of one scene in the 2001 movie Just Visiting and 1997 movie My Best Friend's Wedding.

== See also ==
- List of Chicago Landmarks
