= John Vinci =

American architect

John Vinci (born February 6, 1937) is a Chicago-based American architect who works on architectural preservation of historic buildings in addition to new designs.

He is noted for the rehabilitation of many noted landmarks including Frank Lloyd Wright’s studio in Oak Park, Illinois, Louis Sullivan’s Carson Pirie Scott department store and the reconstruction of the Adler and Sullivan Stock Exchange Trading Room inside the Art Institute of Chicago.

== Early life, education and career ==
John Vinci was born on February 6, 1937, in Chicago, Illinois to Italian immigrants Nicholas Vinci and his wife, Nicoline and is the youngest of Nicholas' seven children. He received a Bachelor of Architecture from the Illinois Institute of Technology in 1960 and began his architectural career at Skidmore, Owings & Merrill in Chicago before moving to Brenner Danforth Rockwell Architects. He has since headed his own firms, including Vinci/Kenny Architects (1969-1979), and the Office of John Vinci, Inc. (1980-1995). He is currently partnered with Philip Hamp in Vinci | Hamp Architects (VHA)

In addition to his architectural work, Mr. Vinci has extensive experience in the design of art exhibition installations at the Art Institute of Chicago and other museums. Mr. Vinci has also been an instructor of the history of nineteenth and twentieth century architecture at the Illinois Institute of Technology (1972-1992) (2000), and at Roosevelt University (1970-1972). He has written or contributed to architectural books and publications most notably The Complete Architecture of Adler and Sullivan, (Aaron Siskind and Richard Nickel with John Vinci and Ward Miller, 2011, Published by The Richard Nickel Committee).

== Select Restoration Work ==
- Frank Lloyd Wright's Studio in Oak Park, Illinois
- Louis Sullivan’s Carson Pirie Scott department store
- The exterior masonry of H.H. Richardson's John J. Glessner House
- The Art Institute of Chicago's Grand Stair and Lobby
- The reconstruction of the Adler and Sullivan Chicago Stock Exchange Trading Room inside the Art Institute of Chicago.

== Select new designs ==
- South Kenwood Residence (2001)
- The Arts Club of Chicago (1997)
- The National Italian American Sports Hall of Fame (2000) (former) (building altered)
- The Manilow Residence., with Max Gordon (1991)

== Select Awards ==
- AIA, Chicago Chapter, Lifetime Achievement Award, 2014
- Named Legendary Landmark, 2011, Landmark Illinois
- AIA, Chicago Chapter: Honor Award for restoration of Hyde Park Historical Society (former Chicago Street Railway Company) Building, 1981
- AIA, Chicago Chapter: Honor Award for restoration of the Trading Room, Art Institute of Chicago, 1980
- AIA, Chicago Chapter: Honor Award for restoration of Carson, Pirie, Scott & Co. Department Store, 1980
