= Adler & Sullivan =

Former Chicago architectural firm

Adler & Sullivan was an architectural firm founded by Dankmar Adler and Louis Sullivan in Chicago. Among its projects was the multi-purpose Auditorium Building in Chicago and the Wainwright Building skyscraper in St Louis. In 1883 Louis Sullivan was added to Adler's architectural firm, creating the Adler & Sullivan partnership. According to Architect Ward Miller:

Adler & Sullivan are most associated with being an innovative and progressive architectural practice, forwarding the idea of an American style and expressing this in a truly modern format. Their work was widely published and at the forefront of building construction. Their buildings and especially their multipurpose structures ... were unequaled. Furthermore, the expression of a tall building, its structure with a definite base, middle section or shaft and top or cornice was a new approach for the high building design. These types of tall structures developed into a format. ... Even today, the vertical expression of a building employs these design principals.

Adler, with his engineering prowess and facility with acoustics became seen as the business genius of the partnership, while Sullivan, known for his great design talent, is recounted as the artist.

== Selected commissions ==
- Ann Halsted House, Chicago, Illinois, 1883
- Halsted Row Houses, Chicago, Illinois, 1884
- Leon Mannheimer House, Chicago, Illinois, 1884
- Desenberg Building, Kalamazoo, Michigan, 1885
- Joseph Deimel House, Chicago, Illinois, 1886
- Auditorium Building, Chicago, Illinois 1889
- Pueblo Opera House, Pueblo, Colorado, 1890
- Carrie Eliza Getty Tomb, Graceland Cemetery, Chicago, 1890
- Wainwright Building, St. Louis, Missouri, 1891
- Charnley-Norwood House, Ocean Springs, Mississippi, 1891
- Louis Sullivan Bungalow, Ocean Springs, Mississippi, 1891
- James Charnley House, Chicago, Illinois, 1891
- Albert Sullivan House, Chicago, Illinois, 1891
- Union Trust Building, St. Louis (1893; street-level ornament heavily altered in 1924)
- Chicago Stock Exchange Building, Chicago, 1893
- Prudential (Guaranty) Building, Buffalo, New York, 1894

== Notable employees ==
- Frank Lloyd Wright
- George Grant Elmslie
- Irving John Gill
