= Landmarks Preservation Council of Illinois =

Nonprofit organization

The Landmarks Preservation Council of Illinois – now known as Landmarks Illinois – is a not-for-profit organization founded in 1971 to prevent the demolition of the Dankmar Adler and Louis Sullivan designed Chicago Stock Exchange Building. Although this effort failed the organization has grown to become a 2000-member statewide voice for historic preservation.

The founding mission was "to stop the demolition of significant buildings in downtown Chicago." The LPCI has broadened its scope and geography "to embrace architecturally and historically significant archeological sites, structures, and historic districts in all the cities, towns and rural areas of Illinois." Today LPCI holds conservation easements on 341 properties. Among the historic buildings they have saved are the Marquette Building and the Reliance Building.

Landmarks Illinois was involved in a highly publicized preservation effort to save Mies van der Rohe's Farnsworth House from being dismantled and relocated from its original site along the Fox River. Modern architecture enthusiasts from around the globe answered the call to donate funds, and the house was purchased at auction from Sotheby's on December 12, 2003. A rare example of freestanding single family design by van der Rohe, the house is now operated by Landmarks Illinois and open to the public for tours.

In addition to preserving buildings, Landmarks Illinois has since 2007 also held an annual gala to acknowledge "Legendary Landmarks", described as "citizens who have made contributions to the civic and cultural life of Chicago and Illinois."
