= Haymarket District =

Haymarket District may refer to:

- Haymarket Commercial Historic District in Council Bluffs, Iowa
- Haymarket Historic District in Kalamazoo, Michigan
- Haymarket District (Lincoln, Nebraska)
