= 30 North LaSalle =

Office skyscraper in Chicago, Illinois

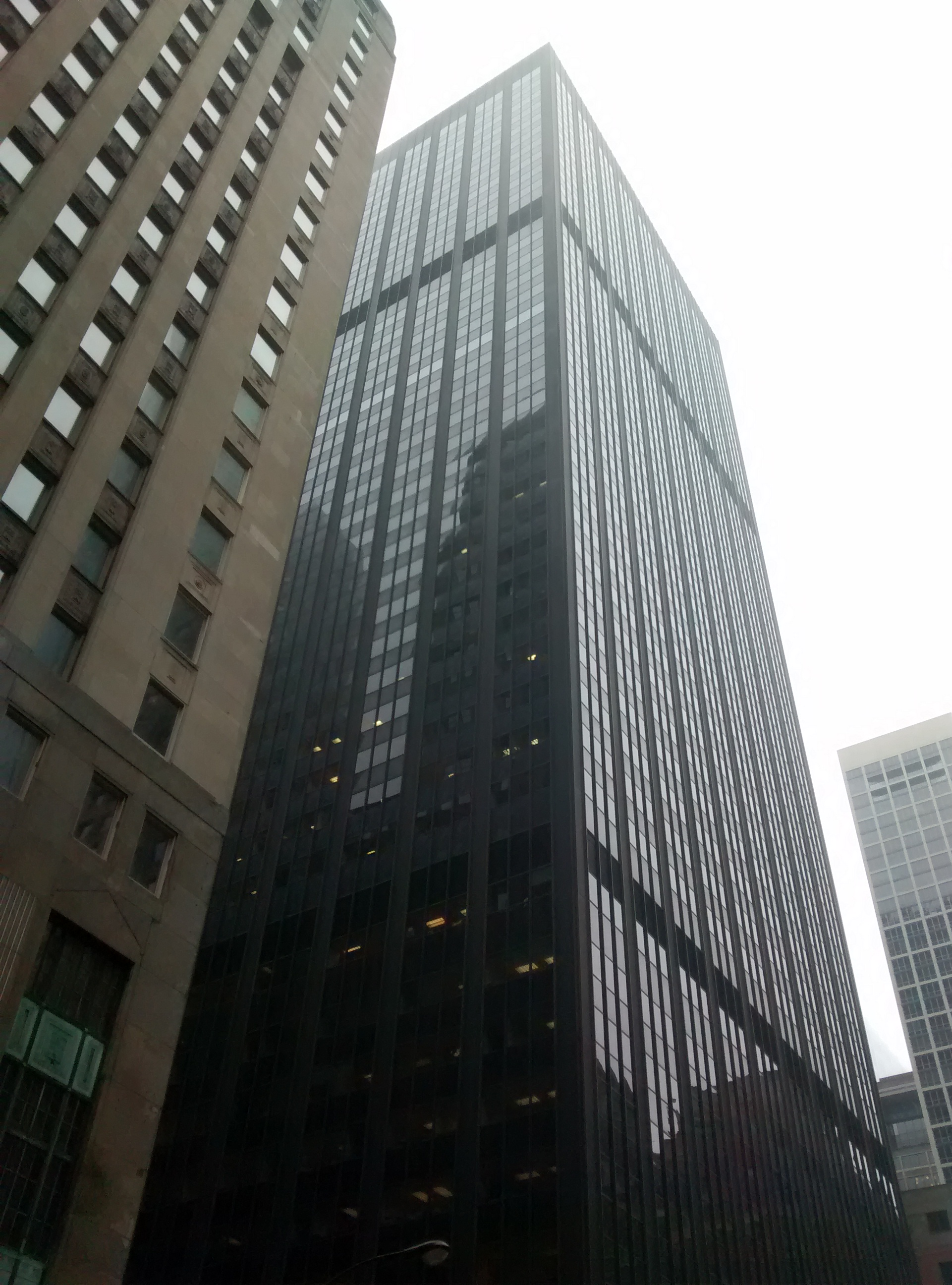

- Location within Chicago metropolitan area

General information
- Type: Office
- Location: 30 North LaSalle Street, Chicago, Illinois
- Coordinates: 41.8828°N 87.6329°W
- Completed: 1975

Height
- Roof: 553 ft (169 m)

Technical details
- Floor count: 44

Design and construction
- Architect: Thomas E. Stanley

30 North LaSalle is a 553 ft (169m) tall skyscraper in Chicago, Illinois, United States. It was completed in 1975 and has 44 floors. Thomas E. Stanley designed the building, which is the 81st tallest in Chicago.

It is built on the site of the Chicago Stock Exchange Building, designed by Louis Sullivan. A project to convert the building into 349 apartments was proposed in 2025, after the city granted $57 million in financing the previous year. The building was nominated for Chicago Landmark status in late 2025. The designation was approved in 2026, making the development eligible for temporary tax abatements. As of August 2026, the building is being converted into 432 apartments.

== Tenants ==
- Telephone and Data Systems

== See also ==
- List of tallest buildings in Chicago
