= Albert Sullivan House =

Building in Chicago, Illinois (1892–1970)

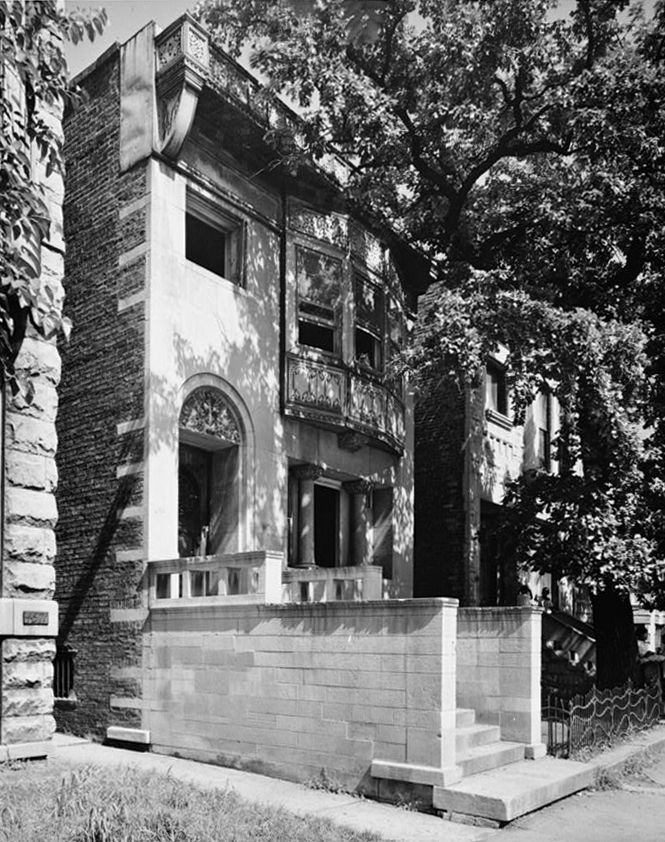

General information
- Architectural style: Chicago School
- Address: 4575 South Lake Park Avenue
- Year(s) built: 1891–1892

Design and construction
- Architect(s): Louis H. Sullivan, Frank Lloyd Wright

The Albert Sullivan House was a home located at 4575 South Lake Park Avenue in the Kenwood neighborhood of the South Side of Chicago, Illinois, from 1892 to 1970.

== History ==
The two-story brick and graystone townhouse was designed by Louis Sullivan and Frank Lloyd Wright, of the architectural firm of Adler and Sullivan, and was originally intended for Sullivan's mother, who had died around the completion of the home's construction. Following the death of his mother, Sullivan lived in the house from 1892 until 1896, when his brother, Albert and his family moved in. The Sullivan family resided there until 1905.

In 1960, the Commission on Chicago Architectural Landmarks recognized the building as a Chicago Architectural Landmark. It was demolished in April 1970.

== Architecture ==
The house, was constructed on a narrow lot (21.5 ft (6.6 m)), as part of a stretch of row houses along South Lake Park Avenue. The building was set back 10 ft (3.0 m) from the sidewalk, and the front yard was enclosed within a simple, low iron fence. The bedford limestone street facade was relatively austere, reminiscent of Sullivan's James Charnley House, although the box cornice and decorative bay window on the second floor, were sheathed in ornamented copper. The vestibule had a mosaic floor, plaster walls, with a coved plaster cornice.
