= Pueblo Opera House =

Former theater in Colorado (USA)

Coordinates: 38.2709°N 104.6091°W

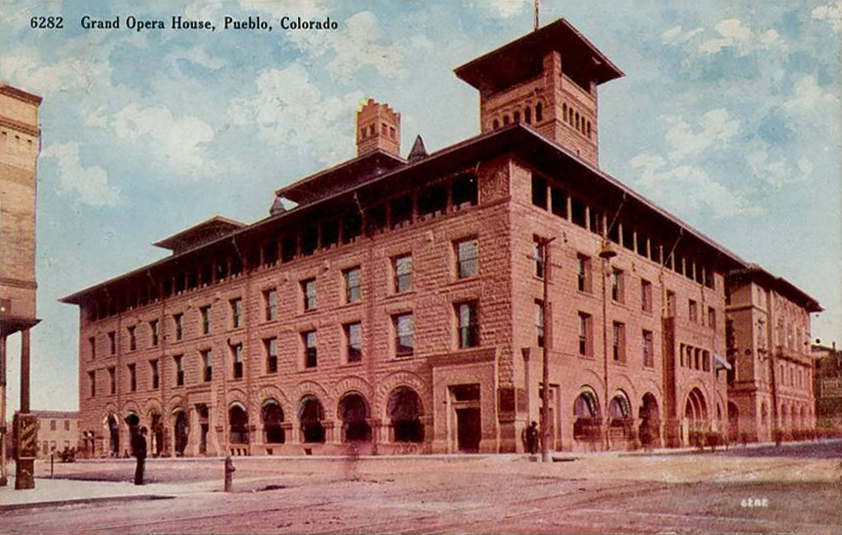
1912 postcard with a photograph of the Pueblo Opera House

The Pueblo Opera House (also known as the Grand Opera House) was a theater built in Pueblo, Colorado, and opened in 1890. The building was completely destroyed by a fire in 1922.

In June 1888 the architectural firm of Adler & Sullivan was contracted to design an opera house in Pueblo, Colorado. They were to be paid $400,000, the largest fee the firm had yet received for a building outside of Chicago.

The exterior of the four-story building was designed in a combination Richardsonian Romanesque and Italian Renaissance style, with rusticated Manitou red sandstone on a granite base.

The hall seated 1,200 people, and the balcony was the first in the United States to "span an auditorium without intermediate buttressing". The ceiling and walls of the auditorium were covered with Louis Sullivan's distinctive decorations.

Mario Elia, in his study of Sullivan and his work, suggests that the broad projecting roof was a detail contributed by Frank Lloyd Wright, who was employed at Sullivan's office at the time.

The building was topped by a tower.

On the night of February 28 – March 1, 1922, the Pueblo Grocers' Association's annual ball was held there, and it is believed that a cigarette may have ignited litter left behind after the event. The fire was discovered at 1:15 a.m., the roof collapsed at 1:50, and all the interior floors had given way by 2:10. Despite the fire department's efforts to save the building, it was a total loss.
