= Dankmar Adler =

American architect (1844–1900)

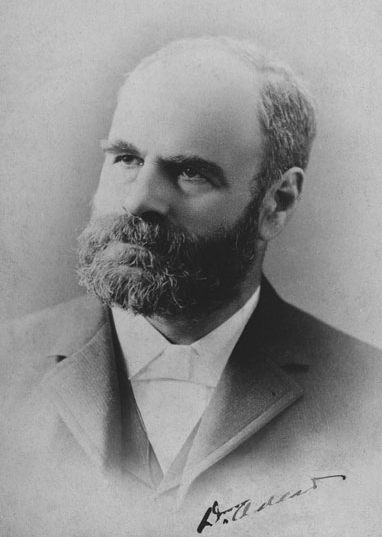
- Born: July 3, 1844; Stadtlengsfeld, Thuringia, Germany
- Died: April 16, 1900 (aged 55); Chicago, Illinois, US
- Occupation: Architect

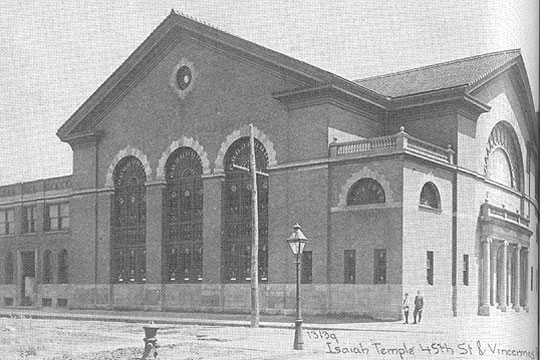
Temple Isaiah, Chicago, designed by Adler, 1898

Dankmar Adler (Stadtlengsfeld July 3, 1844 – Chicago April 16, 1900) was a German-born American architect and civil engineer. He is best known for his fifteen-year partnership with Louis Sullivan, during which they designed influential skyscrapers that boldly addressed their steel skeleton through their exterior design: the Wainwright Building in St. Louis, Missouri (1891), the Chicago Stock Exchange Building (1894), and the Guaranty Building in Buffalo, New York (1896).

== Early years ==
Adler was born in Stadtlengsfeld, Germany; his mother, Sara Eliel, died when he was born. In 1854, he came to the United States with his father Liebman Adler, a rabbi. They took up residence in Detroit, and Liebman became the rabbi of Congregation Beth-El. Subsequently, they moved to Chicago. Adler had some elementary-level education in the City of Detroit, and Ann Arbor, before leaving school to become a draftsman.

== Career ==
Adler served in the Union Army during the American Civil War with Battery "M", 1st Illinois Light Artillery Regiment. He was a private. He did engineering work in the Chattanooga and Atlanta Campaigns.

After the war, he worked as an architect in Chicago, working first with Augustus Bauer and next with Ozias S. Kinney. In 1871, Adler formed a partnership with Edward Burling that ultimately created more than 100 buildings.

Adler eventually started his own firm. He hired Louis Sullivan as a draughtsman and designer in 1880, and made him a partner three years later.

Adler's partnership with Sullivan was short-lived; due to a slump in their architectural practice brought on by the Panic of 1893, and Adler's desire to bring his two sons into the firm, there arose a rift with Sullivan, the result of which was that Adler left the partnership to join an elevator firm as engineer and salesman. After a short period, Adler returned to architecture, in partnership with his two sons, but never regaining the prominence he had with Sullivan.

Adler and Sullivan's Auditorium Building (1889) is an early example of splendid acoustical engineering, as is their Kehilath Anshe Ma'ariv Synagogue. Both drew upon the fine acoustics in Adler's earlier Central Music Hall. Adler was an acclaimed expert in acoustics, yet he was unable to explain fully the excellent acoustic properties of his buildings.

With his partner Burling and thereafter, as a partner in Adler and Sullivan, Adler was instrumental in rebuilding much of Chicago following the Great Chicago Fire. Adler is considered a leader in the Chicago school of architecture. In addition to their pioneering accomplishments with steel-framed buildings and skyscrapers, Dankmar Adler and Louis Sullivan were early employers and mentors of architect Frank Lloyd Wright, whose consistent praise for Adler ("the 'American Engineer' my 'Big Chief'") surpassed even that which he reserved for Sullivan, whom he called his "lieber Meister".

The last major building Adler designed was Temple Isaiah.

== Personal life ==
On June 25, 1872, Adler married Dila Kohn (July 5, 1850 – December 3, 1918). Their children include: Abraham K. Adler (September 13, 1873 – October 30, 1914), Sidney Adler (June 26, 1876 – November 25, 1925) and Sadie Adler (born 1878).

Adler died in Chicago, and is buried there at Mount Mayriv Cemetery.

== Legacy ==
Photographs and other archival materials are held by the Ryerson & Burnham Libraries at the Art Institute of Chicago. The Dankmar Adler Collection of letters, papers, and photographs also includes an autobiography.

== Architectural work (partial list) ==
The first group of buildings were created in partnership with Edward Burling:

- Old Chicago Tribune Building, Dearborn & Clark
- Delmonico's, Madison & Clark
- Kingsbury Hall, Clark Street
- Garrett Biblical Institute, Lake Street
- Methodist Church Block, Clark Street
- Samuel Cole Building, W. Lake Street – 1873
- William Rowney Building – 1873
- St James Episcopal Cathedral, E. Huron Street – 1875
- Row Houses, 2225–2245 N. Burling Street – 1875
- Sinai Temple, Indiana Avenue and 21st Street – 1875
- Central Music Hall – 1879
- Borden Block – 1879–80
- Grand Opera House – 1880
- Rothschild Store – 1881
- Jewelers Building 1881–82
- Revell Building – 1881–83
- Third McVickers Theatre – 1883
- Thirty-Ninth Street Passenger Station, ICR – 1883
- Troescher Building – 1884
- Springer Block and Kranz Buildings – 1885–87
- Selz, Schwab & Company Factory – 1886–87
- Wirt Dexter Building – 1887
- Standard Club of Chicago – 1887–88
- James H. Walker Warehouse – 1888
- Auditorium Building – 1887–1889
- Hebrew Manual Training School – 1889–90
- Pueblo Opera House – 1890
- E. W. Blatchford Warehouse – 1889
- Kehilath Anshe Ma'ariv Synagogue (later Pilgrim Baptist Church) – 1890–91, interior destroyed by fire in 2006
- Wainwright Building, St. Louis, Missouri – 1891
- Schiller Building – 1891–92
- James Charnley House – 1891–92
- Albert Sullivan Residence – 1891–92
- Transportation Building, World's Columbian Exposition – 1891–93
- Guaranty Building, Buffalo, New York – 1894
