= Central Music Hall (Chicago) =

Mixed-use building in Illinois (1879–1900)

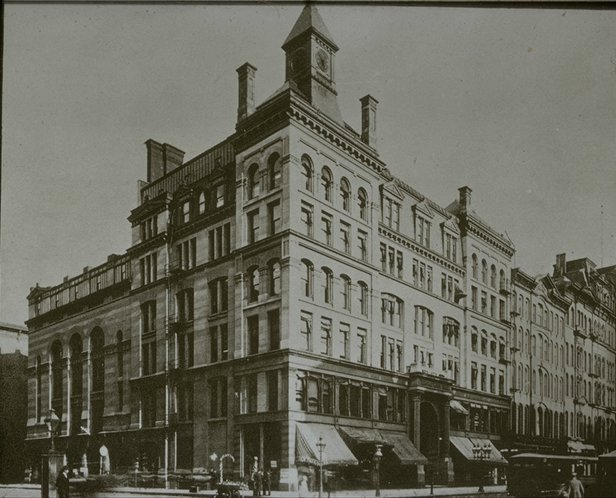
- Interactive map of Central Music Hall
- Location: Southeast corner of State and Randolph Streets, Chicago, IL
- Coordinates: 41.8842°N 87.6275°W
- Type: Office building / Indoor theater

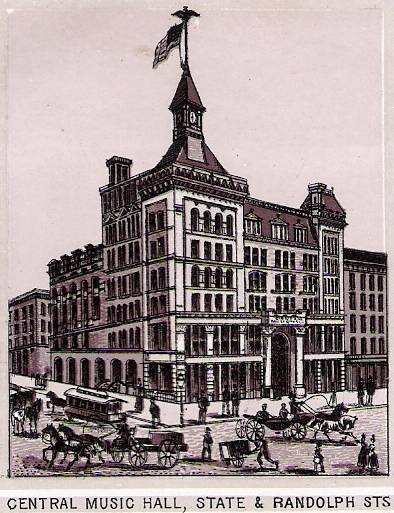

Central Music Hall (1879–1900) was a mixed-use commercial building and theater in Chicago, situated on the southeast corner of State and Randolph Streets. It was designed by celebrated German-born American architect Dankmar Adler. It was the first important building designed by the famous architect, in which he made initial use of his knowledge of acoustics. The building was demolished in 1900, around the same time Adler died, in order to build the Marshall Field & Company store, now Macy's.

== History ==
floor plan of theater

The idea for Central Music Hall was conceived by George B. Carpenter, a local promoter of concerts and lectures. Carpenter was a member of Reverend David Swing's popular nondenominational Central Church, and he imagined a building to be named in its honor that would provide a home for the church and also feature a concert hall, stores, and offices. Construction began in the Spring of 1879 and the auditorium (not yet fully complete) opened on December 5, immediately becoming the city's premier auditorium. It was the first significant music hall to be built following the Great Chicago Fire of 1871. The mixed-use building included a theater, six stories of office space and street-level storefronts.

The theater became nationally known for its excellent acoustics. Prior to Central Music Hall's design, Carpenter had researched acoustics through the works of Scottish engineer John Scott Russell who had studied how sound travels in large interiors. Carpenter gave his findings to Adler who used the knowledge in the hall's design by slanting the audience floor upward away from the stage, thus eliminating obstruction between the stage and audience. He also aligned projecting ceiling beams in the direction of the stage so that sound would be directed off the ceiling. Adler would refine these features in later auditorium designs, including most famously the Auditorium Theater completed in 1890.

Adler said Central Music Hall "has proved in many respects one of the most successful buildings ever erected in Chicago, and I shall always consider it the foundation of whatever professional standing I acquire."

On April 30, 1901, the building was demolished to make way for the main store of Marshall Field & Company, now Macy's, which still occupies the site. Adler died around the same time, in 1900, and a tall, reddish granite column (visible in picture, main right side entrance) from the State Street entrance was preserved and placed at Adler's grave at Mount Mayriv Cemetery. The second column was also saved and now marks the grave of Edwin Walker (1833–1910) at Rosehill Cemetery, however it was heavily modified and doesn't look like the original Adler-designed column. Walker was a friend of Adler, the two often ate dinner together, and he was a stone quarry contractor who probably had provided the granite for the columns when Central Music Hall was built.
