= Louis Sullivan Bungalow =

House in Ocean Springs, Mississippi

Coordinates: 30.395791°N 88.809727°W

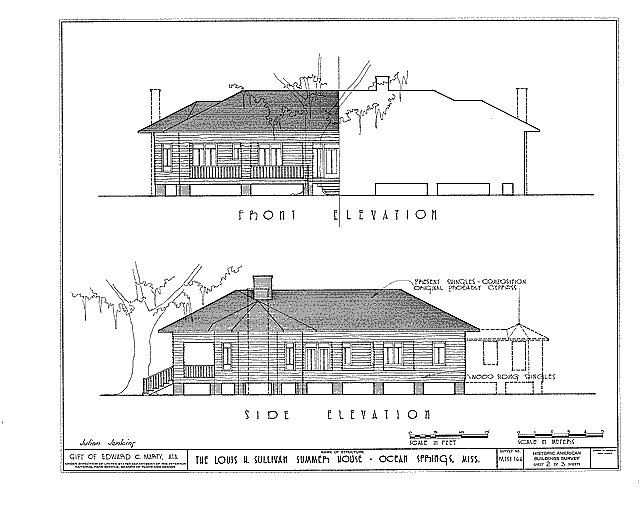
Exterior elevations - front and side

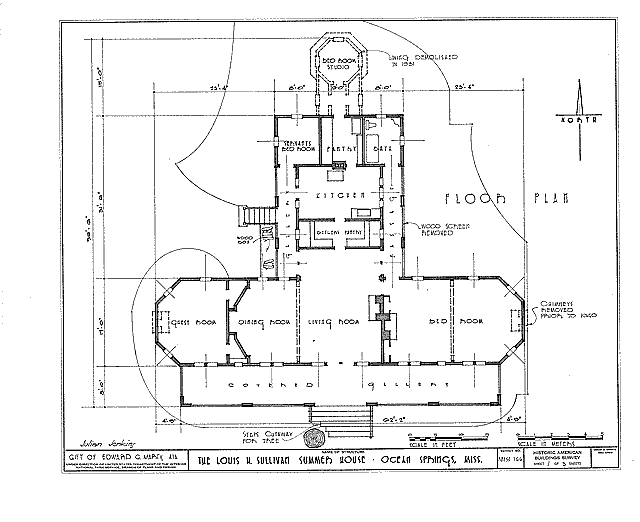
Floor plan of Sullivan's summer house

The Louis Sullivan Bungalow was a vacation home for noted architect Louis Sullivan on the Gulf Coast in Ocean Springs, Mississippi. It was listed on the National Register of Historic Places for its association with Sullivan and Frank Lloyd Wright, who both claimed credit for its design. It was built in the early 1890s and restored in the 1980s, but was destroyed by Hurricane Katrina in 2005.

== See also ==
- List of Frank Lloyd Wright works
