= Louis Sullivan =

American architect (1856–1924)

Louis Henry Sullivan
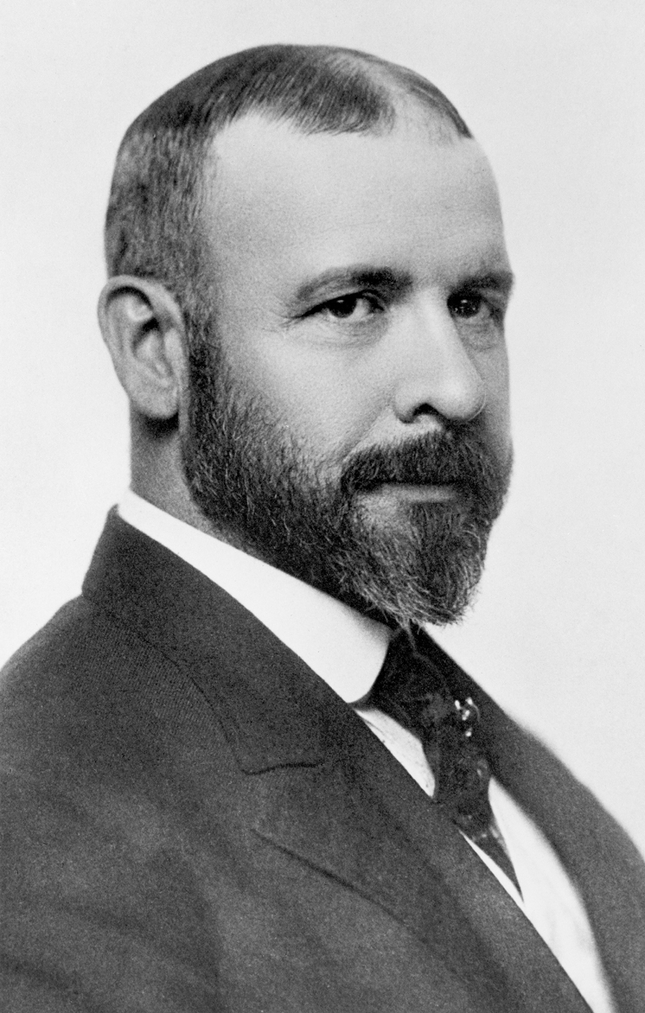
- Sullivan in c. 1895
- Born: September 3, 1856; Boston, Massachusetts, U.S.
- Died: April 14, 1924 (aged 67); Chicago, Illinois, U.S.
- Resting place: Graceland Cemetery
- Occupation: Architect

Louis Henry Sullivan (September 3, 1856 – April 14, 1924) was an American architect, and has been called a "father of skyscrapers" and "father of modernism". He was an influential architect of the Chicago School, a mentor to Frank Lloyd Wright, and an inspiration to the Chicago group of architects who have come to be known as the Prairie School. Along with Wright and Henry Hobson Richardson, Sullivan is one of "the recognized trinity of American architecture." The phrase "form follows function" is attributed to him; it encapsulated earlier theories of architecture and he applied them to the modern age of the skyscraper. In 1944, Sullivan was the second architect to posthumously receive the AIA Gold Medal.

== Early life and career ==
Sullivan was born to a Swiss-born mother, Andrienne née List (who had emigrated to Boston from Geneva with her parents and two siblings, Jenny, b. 1836, and Jules, b. 1841) and an Irish-born father, Patrick Sullivan. Both had immigrated to the United States in the late 1840s. He learned that he could both graduate from high school a year early and bypass the first two years at the Massachusetts Institute of Technology by passing a series of examinations. Entering MIT at the age of sixteen, Sullivan studied architecture there briefly. After one year of study, he moved to Philadelphia and took a job with architect Frank Furness.

The Depression of 1873 dried up much of Furness's work, and he was forced to let Sullivan go. Sullivan moved to Chicago in 1873 to take part in the building boom following the Great Chicago Fire of 1871. He worked for William LeBaron Jenney, the architect often credited with erecting the first steel frame building. After less than a year with Jenney, Sullivan moved to Paris and studied at the École des Beaux-Arts for a year. He returned to Chicago and began work for the firm of Joseph S. Johnston & John Edelman as a draftsman. Johnston & Edleman were commissioned for the design of the Moody Tabernacle, and tasked Sullivan with the design of the interior decorative fresco secco stencils (stencil technique applied on dry plaster). In 1879 Dankmar Adler hired Sullivan. A year later, Sullivan became a partner in Adler's firm. The time at Adler & Sullivan marked the beginning of Sullivan's most productive years.

Adler and Sullivan initially achieved fame as theater architects. While most of their theaters were in Chicago, their fame won commissions as far west as Pueblo, Colorado, and Seattle, Washington (unbuilt). The culminating project of this phase of the firm's history was the 1889 Auditorium Building (1886–90, opened in stages) in Chicago, an extraordinary mixed-use building that included not only a 4,200-seat theater, but also a hotel and an office building with a 17-story tower and commercial storefronts at the ground level of the building, fronting Congress and Wabash Avenues. After 1889 the firm became known for their office buildings, particularly the 1891 Wainwright Building in St. Louis and the Schiller (later Garrick) Building and theater (1890) in Chicago. Other buildings often noted include the Chicago Stock Exchange Building (1894), the Guaranty Building (also known as the Prudential Building) of 1895–96 in Buffalo, New York, and the 1899–1904 Carson Pirie Scott Department Store by Sullivan on State Street in Chicago.

== Sullivan and the steel high-rise ==
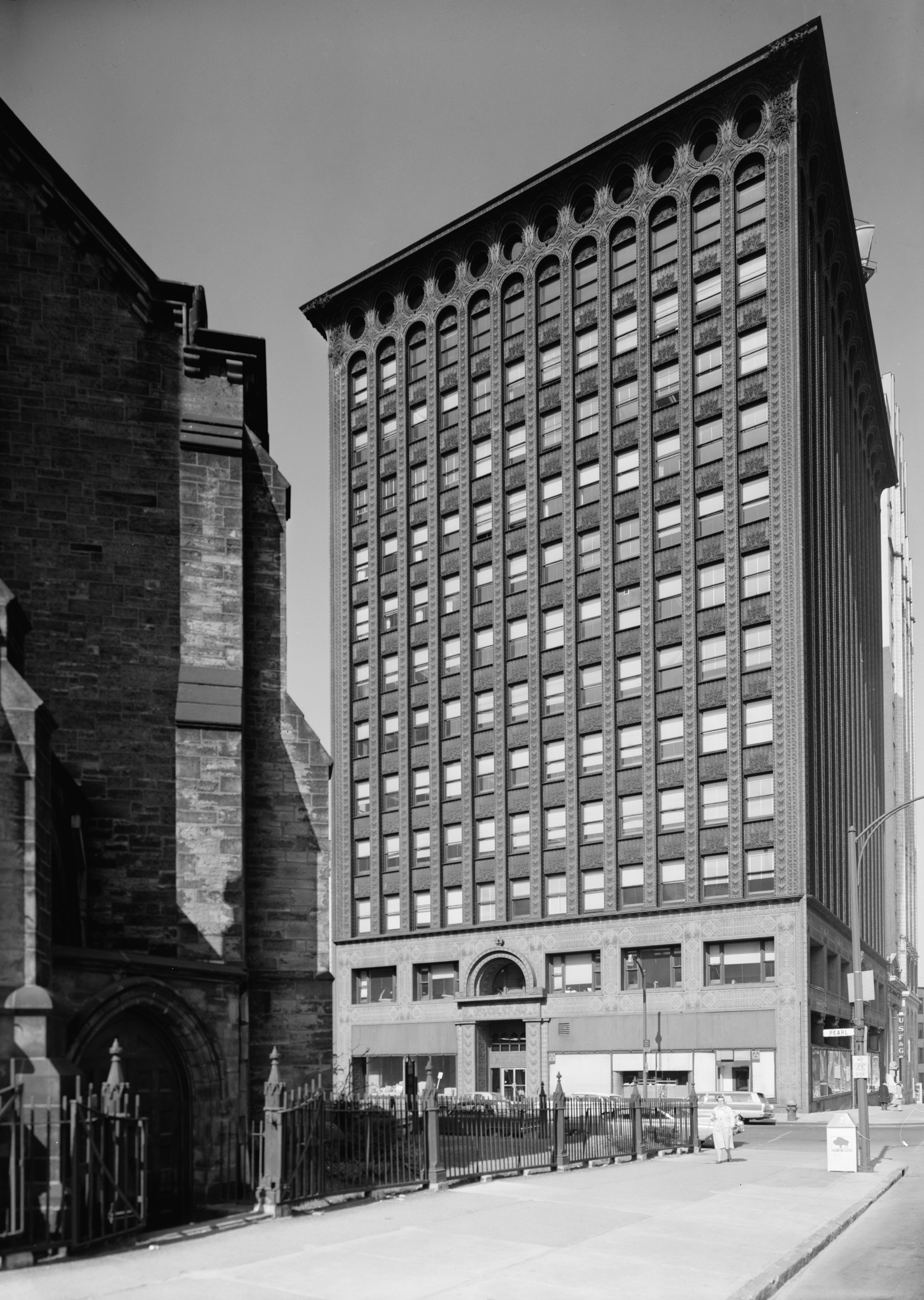
Prudential Building, also known as the Guaranty Building, Buffalo, New York, 1894

Prior to the late nineteenth century, the weight of a multi-story building had to be supported principally by the strength of its walls. The taller the building, the more strain is placed on the lower sections of the building; since there were clear engineering limits to the weight such "load-bearing" walls could sustain, tall designs meant massively thick walls on the ground floors, and definite limits on the building's height.

The development of cheap, versatile steel in the second half of the nineteenth century changed those rules. America was in the midst of rapid social and economic growth that made for great opportunities in architectural design. A much more urbanized society was forming and the society called out for new, larger buildings. The mass production of steel was the main driving force behind the ability to build skyscrapers during the mid-1880s. By assembling a framework of steel girders, architects and builders could create tall, slender buildings with a strong and relatively lightweight steel skeleton. The rest of the building elements—walls, floors, ceilings, and windows—were suspended from the skeleton, which carried the weight. This new way of constructing buildings, so-called "column-frame" construction, pushed them up rather than out. The steel weight-bearing frame allowed not just taller buildings, but permitted much larger windows, which meant more daylight reaching interior spaces. Interior walls became thinner, which created more usable (and rentable) floor space.

Chicago's Monadnock Building (not designed by Sullivan) straddles this remarkable moment of transition: the northern half of the building, finished in 1891, is of load-bearing construction, while the southern half, finished only two years later, is of column-frame construction. While experiments in this new technology were taking place in many cities, Chicago was the crucial laboratory. Industrial capital and civic pride drove a surge of new construction throughout the city's downtown in the wake of the 1871 fire.

The technical limits of weight-bearing masonry had formal and structural constraints which were remedied by Sullivan. None of the historical precedents were necessarily followed, causing a sort of literary, and technical crisis. Sullivan addressed the crisis by embracing the changes that came with the steel frame, creating a grammar of form for the high rise (base, shaft, and cornice), simplifying the appearance of the building by breaking away from historical styles, using his own intricate floral designs, in vertical bands, to draw the eye upward and to emphasize the vertical form of the building, and relating the shape of the building to its specific purpose. Such innovations were unique, and commercially successful.

In 1896, Louis Sullivan wrote:

It is the pervading law of all things organic and inorganic, of all things physical and metaphysical, of all things human, and all things super-human, of all true manifestations of the head, of the heart, of the soul, that the life is recognizable in its expression, that form ever follows function. This is the law. (italics in original)

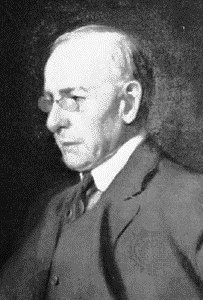
Sullivan in 1919, painting by Frank A. Werner

"Form follows function" would become one of the prevailing tenets of modern architects.

Sullivan attributed the concept to Marcus Vitruvius Pollio, the Roman architect, engineer, and author, who first asserted in his book, De architectura (On architecture), that a structure must exhibit the three qualities of firmitas, utilitas, venustas – that is, it must be "solid, useful, beautiful." This credo, which placed the demands of practical use equal to aesthetics, later would be taken by influential designers to imply that decorative elements, which architects call "ornament", were superfluous in modern buildings, but Sullivan neither thought nor designed along such dogmatic lines during the peak of his career and this credo never put one concept above another. While his buildings could be spare and crisp in their principal masses, he often punctuated their plain surfaces with eruptions of lush Art Nouveau or Celtic Revival decorations, usually cast in iron or terra cotta, and ranging from organic forms, such as vines and ivy, to more geometric designs and interlace, inspired by his Irish design heritage. Terra cotta is lighter and easier to work with than stone masonry. Sullivan used it in his architecture because it had a malleability that was appropriate for his ornament. Probably the most famous example of ornament used by Sullivan is the writhing green ironwork that covers the entrance canopies of the Carson Pirie Scott store on south State Street.

Such ornaments, often executed by the younger draftsmen in Sullivan's employ, eventually would become Sullivan's trademark; to students of architecture, they are instantly recognizable as his signature.

Another signature element of Sullivan's work is the massive, semi-circular arch. Sullivan employed such arches throughout his career—in shaping entrances, in framing windows, or as interior design.

All of these elements are found in Sullivan's widely admired Guaranty Building, which he designed while partnered with Adler. Completed in 1895, this office building in Buffalo, New York is in the Palazzo style, visibly divided into three "zones" of design: a plain, wide-windowed base for the ground-level shops; the main office block, with vertical ribbons of masonry rising unimpeded across nine upper floors to emphasize the building's height; and an ornamented cornice perforated by round windows at the roof level, where the building's mechanical units (such as the elevator motors) were housed. The cornice is covered by Sullivan's trademark Art Nouveau vines and each ground-floor entrance is topped by a semi-circular arch.

Because Sullivan's remarkable accomplishments in design and construction occurred at such a critical time in architectural history, he often has been described as the "father" of the American skyscraper. But many architects had been building skyscrapers before or as contemporaries of Sullivan; they were designed as an expression of new technology. Chicago was replete with extraordinary designers and builders in the late years of the nineteenth century, including Sullivan's partner, Dankmar Adler, as well as Daniel Burnham and John Wellborn Root. Root was one of the builders of the Monadnock Building (see above). That and another Root design, the Masonic Temple Tower (both in Chicago), are cited by many as the originators of skyscraper aesthetics of bearing wall and column-frame construction, respectively.

== Later career and decline ==
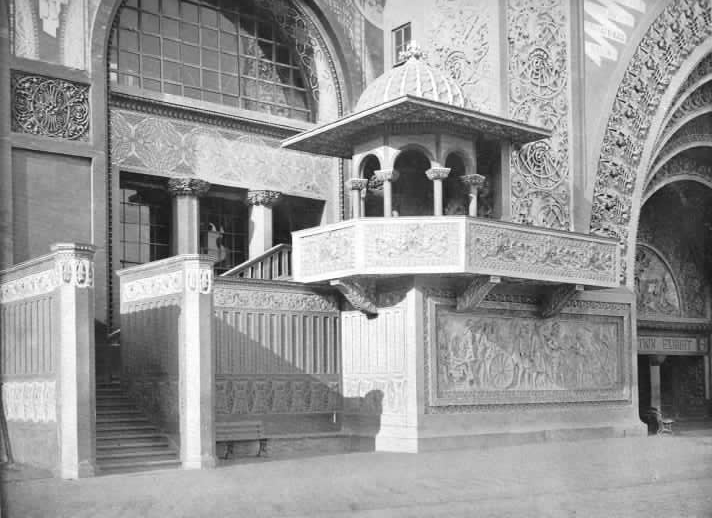
Ornamentation on the World's Fair Transportation Building, Chicago, 1893–94

In 1890, Sullivan was one of the ten U.S. architects, five from the east and five from the west, chosen to build a major structure for the "White City", the World's Columbian Exposition, held in Chicago in 1893. Sullivan's massive Transportation Building and huge arched "Golden Door" stood out as the only building not of the current Beaux-Arts style, and with the only multicolored facade in the entire White City. Sullivan and fair director Daniel Burnham were vocal about their displeasure with each other. Sullivan later claimed (1922) that the fair set the course of American architecture back "for half a century from its date, if not longer." His was the only building to receive extensive recognition outside America, receiving three medals from the French-based Union Centrale des Arts Decoratifs the following year.

Like all American architects, Adler and Sullivan suffered a precipitous decline in their practice with the onset of the Panic of 1893. According to Charles Bebb, who was working in the office at that time, Adler borrowed money to try to keep employees on the payroll. By 1894, however, in the face of continuing financial distress with no relief in sight, Adler and Sullivan dissolved their partnership. The Guaranty Building was considered the last major project of the firm.

By both temperament and connections, Adler had been the one who brought in new business to the partnership, and following the rupture Sullivan received few large commissions after the Carson Pirie Scott Department Store. He went into a twenty-year-long financial and emotional decline, beset by a shortage of commissions, chronic financial problems, and alcoholism. He obtained a few commissions for small-town Midwestern banks (see below), wrote books, and in 1922 appeared as a critic of Raymond Hood's winning entry for the Tribune Tower competition.

In 1922, Sullivan was paid $100 a month to write an autobiography in installments to be published in the journal for the American Institute of Architects. Sullivan worked on the series with Journal editor Charles Harris Whitaker, who advised he "plot out the material by periods." The Autobiography of an Idea began its publication in the June 1922 Journal for the American Institute of Architects and upon its conclusion was published as a book.

He died in a Chicago hotel room on April 14, 1924. He left a wife, Mary Azona Hattabaugh, from whom he was separated. A modest headstone marks his final resting spot in Graceland Cemetery in Chicago's Uptown and Lake View neighborhood. Later, a monument was erected in Sullivan's honor, a few feet from his headstone.

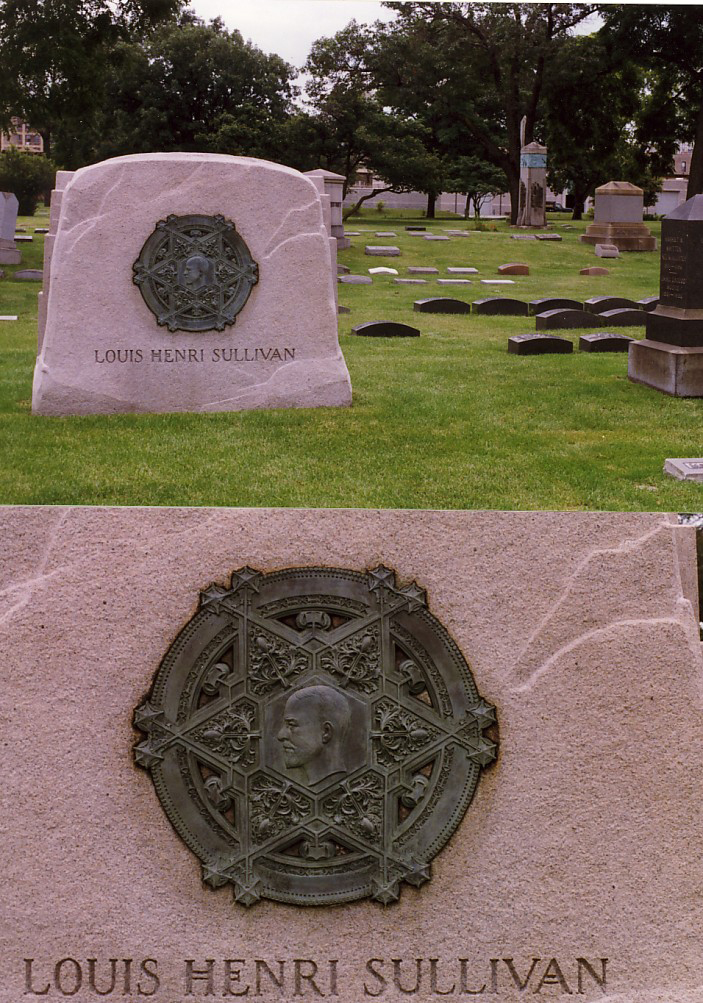
Monument for Sullivan in Graceland Cemetery, Chicago, Illinois, with an alternative spelling of his middle name

== Legacy ==
Sullivan's legacy is contradictory. Some consider him the first modernist. His forward-looking designs clearly anticipate some issues and solutions of Modernism; however, his embrace of ornament makes his contribution distinct from the Modern Movement that coalesced in the 1920s and became known as the "International Style". Sullivan's built work expresses the appeal of his incredible designs: the vertical bands on the Wainwright Building, the burst of welcoming Art Nouveau ironwork on the corner entrance of the Carson Pirie Scott store, the (lost) terra cotta griffins and porthole windows on the Union Trust building, and the white angels of the Bayard Building, Sullivan's only work in New York City. Except for some designs by his longtime draftsman George Grant Elmslie, and the occasional tribute to Sullivan such as Schmidt, Garden & Martin's First National Bank in Pueblo, Colorado (built across the street from Adler and Sullivan's Pueblo Opera House), his style is unique. A visit to the preserved Chicago Stock Exchange trading floor, now at The Art Institute of Chicago, is proof of the immediate and visceral power of the ornament that he used so selectively.

After his death Sullivan was referred to as a bold architect: "Boldly he challenged the whole theory of copying and imitating, and the catchword of "precedent", declaring that architecture was naturally a living and creative art." James Marston Fitch wrote that Sullivan "was quick to see the advantages in other men's work, and quick to adapt them to his own uses . . . He was a man in search of an architectural idiom which would be, not his own personal property, but that of the American people." Sullivan believed that architecture was a manifestation of a culture, its people, its needs, and its values. The architect, Sullivan told the Chicago Architectural Club in 1899, "is and imperatively shall be an interpreter of the national life of his time."

Original drawings and other archival materials from Sullivan are held by the Ryerson & Burnham Libraries in the Art Institute of Chicago and by the drawings and archives department in the Avery Architectural and Fine Arts Library at Columbia University. Fragments of Sullivan buildings also are held in many fine art and design museums around the world.

== Preservation ==
During the postwar era of urban renewal, Sullivan's works fell into disfavor, and many were demolished. In the 1970s, growing public concern for these buildings finally resulted in many being saved. The most vocal voice was Richard Nickel, who organized protests against the demolition of architecturally significant buildings. Nickel and others sometimes rescued decorative elements from condemned buildings, sneaking in during demolition. Nickel died inside Sullivan's Stock Exchange building while trying to retrieve some elements, when a floor above him collapsed. Nickel had compiled extensive research on Adler and Sullivan and their many architectural commissions, which he intended to publish in book form.

After Nickel's death, in 1972, the Richard Nickel Committee was formed, to arrange for completion of his book, which was published in 2010. The book features all 256 commissions of Adler and Sullivan. The extensive archive of photographs and research that underpinned the book was donated to the Ryerson and Burnham Libraries at The Art Institute of Chicago. More than 1,300 photographs may be viewed on their website and more than 15,000 photographs are part of the collection at The Art Institute of Chicago. As finally published, the book, The Complete Architecture of Adler & Sullivan, was authored by Richard Nickel, Aaron Siskind, John Vinci, and Ward Miller.

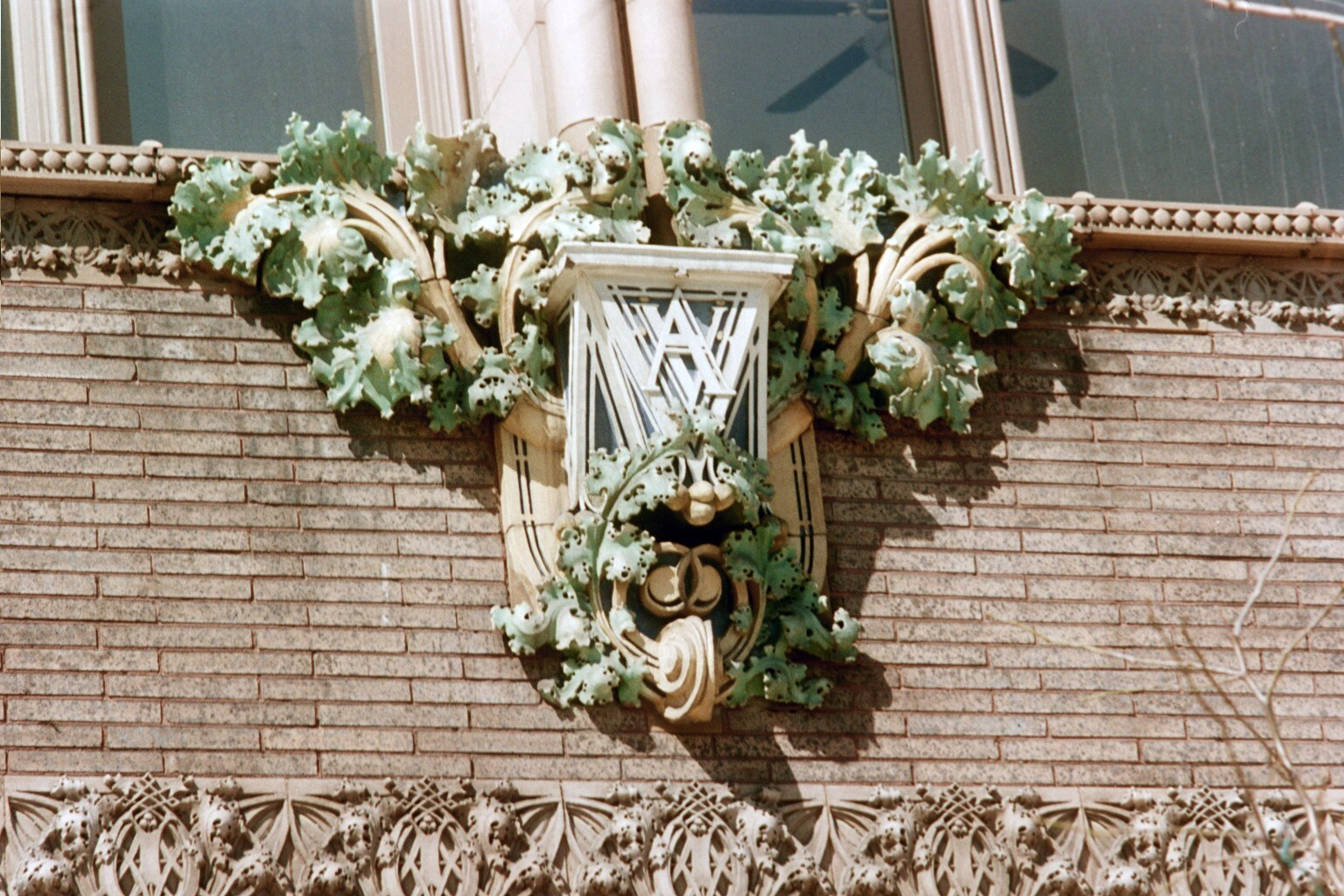
Detail of the ornamentation of the Van Allen Building

Another champion of Sullivan's legacy was the architect Crombie Taylor (1907–1991), of Crombie Taylor Associates. After working in Chicago, where he headed the famous "Institute of Design" (later known as the Illinois Institute of Technology (IIT)) in the 1950s and early 1960s, he moved to Southern California. He led the effort to save the Van Allen Building in Clinton, Iowa from demolition. Taylor, acting as an aesthetic consultant, worked on the renovation of the Auditorium Building (now Roosevelt University) in Chicago.

When he read an article about the planned demolition in Clinton, he uprooted his family from their home in southern California and moved them to Iowa. With the vision of a destination neighborhood comparable to Oak Park, Illinois, he set about creating a nonprofit to save the building, and was successful in doing so. Another advocate for the buildings of both Sullivan and Wright was Jack Randall, who led an effort to save the Wainwright Building in St. Louis, Missouri at a very critical time. He relocated his family to Buffalo, New York to save Sullivan's Guaranty Building and Frank Lloyd Wright's Darwin Martin House from possible demolition. His efforts were successful in both St. Louis and Buffalo.

A collection of architectural ornaments designed by Sullivan is on permanent display at Lovejoy Library at Southern Illinois University Edwardsville. The St. Louis Art Museum also has Sullivan architectural elements displayed. The City Museum in St. Louis has a large collection of Sullivan ornamentation on display, including a cornice from the demolished Chicago Stock Exchange, 29 feet long on one side, 13 feet on another, and nine feet high.

The Guaranty Building Interpretive Center in Buffalo, on the first floor of the building now owned and occupied by the law firm Hodgson Russ, LLP, opened in 2017. The exhibit space was financed by Hodgson Russ and co-designed by Flynn Battaglia Architects and Hadley Exhibits. It features a scale model of the building by David J. Carli, professor of engineering at the State University of New York at Alfred. The center's exhibits were donated to Preservation Buffalo Niagara. The center, the only museum dedicated to Sullivan, is open to the public.

== Sullivan in Ayn Rand's The Fountainhead ==
That the fictional character of Henry Cameron in Ayn Rand's 1943 novel The Fountainhead was similar to the real-life Sullivan was noted, if only in passing, by at least one journalist contemporary to the book.

Although Rand's journal notes contain in toto only some 50 lines directly referring to Sullivan, it is clear from her mention of Sullivan's Autobiography of an Idea (1924) in her 25th-anniversary introduction to her earlier novel We the Living (first published in 1936, and unrelated to architecture) that she was intimately familiar with his life and career. The term "the Fountainhead", which appears nowhere in Rand's novel proper, is found twice (as "the fountainhead" and later as "the fountain head") in Sullivan's autobiography, both times used metaphorically.

The fictional Cameron is, like Sullivan – whose physical description he matches – a great innovative skyscraper pioneer late in the nineteenth century who dies impoverished and embittered in the mid-1920s. Cameron's rapid decline is explicitly attributed to the wave of classical Greco-Roman revivalism in architecture in the wake of the 1893 World's Columbian Exposition, just as Sullivan in his autobiography attributed his own downfall to the same event.

The major difference between novel and real life was in the chronology of Cameron's relation with his protégé Howard Roark, the novel's hero, who eventually goes on to redeem his vision. That Roark's uncompromising individualism and his innovative organic style in architecture were drawn from the life and work of Frank Lloyd Wright is clear from Rand's journal notes, her correspondence, and various contemporary accounts. In the novel, however, the 23-year-old Roark, a generation younger than the real-life Wright, becomes Cameron's protégé in the early 1920s, when Sullivan was long in decline.

The young Wright, by contrast, was Sullivan's protégé for seven years, beginning in 1887, when Sullivan was at the height of his fame and power. The two architects would sever their ties in 1894 due to Sullivan's angry reaction to Wright's moonlighting in breach of his contract with Sullivan, but Wright continued to call Sullivan "lieber Meister" ("beloved Master") for the rest of his life. After decades of estrangement, Wright would again become close to the now-destitute Sullivan in the early 1920s, the time when Roark first comes under the likewise impoverished Cameron's tutelage in the novel. Wright, however, was now in his fifties. Nevertheless, both the young Roark and middle-aged Wright had in common at that time that they both faced a decade of struggle ahead. After the triumphs earlier in his career, Wright came increasingly to be viewed as a has-been, until he experienced a renaissance in the latter half of the 1930s with such projects as Fallingwater and the Johnson Wax Headquarters.

== Selected projects ==
Buildings 1887–1895 by Adler & Sullivan:

- Martin Ryerson Tomb, Graceland Cemetery, Chicago (1887)
- Auditorium Building, Chicago (1889)
- Carrie Eliza Getty Tomb, Graceland Cemetery, Chicago (1890)
- Wainwright Building, St. Louis (1890-91)

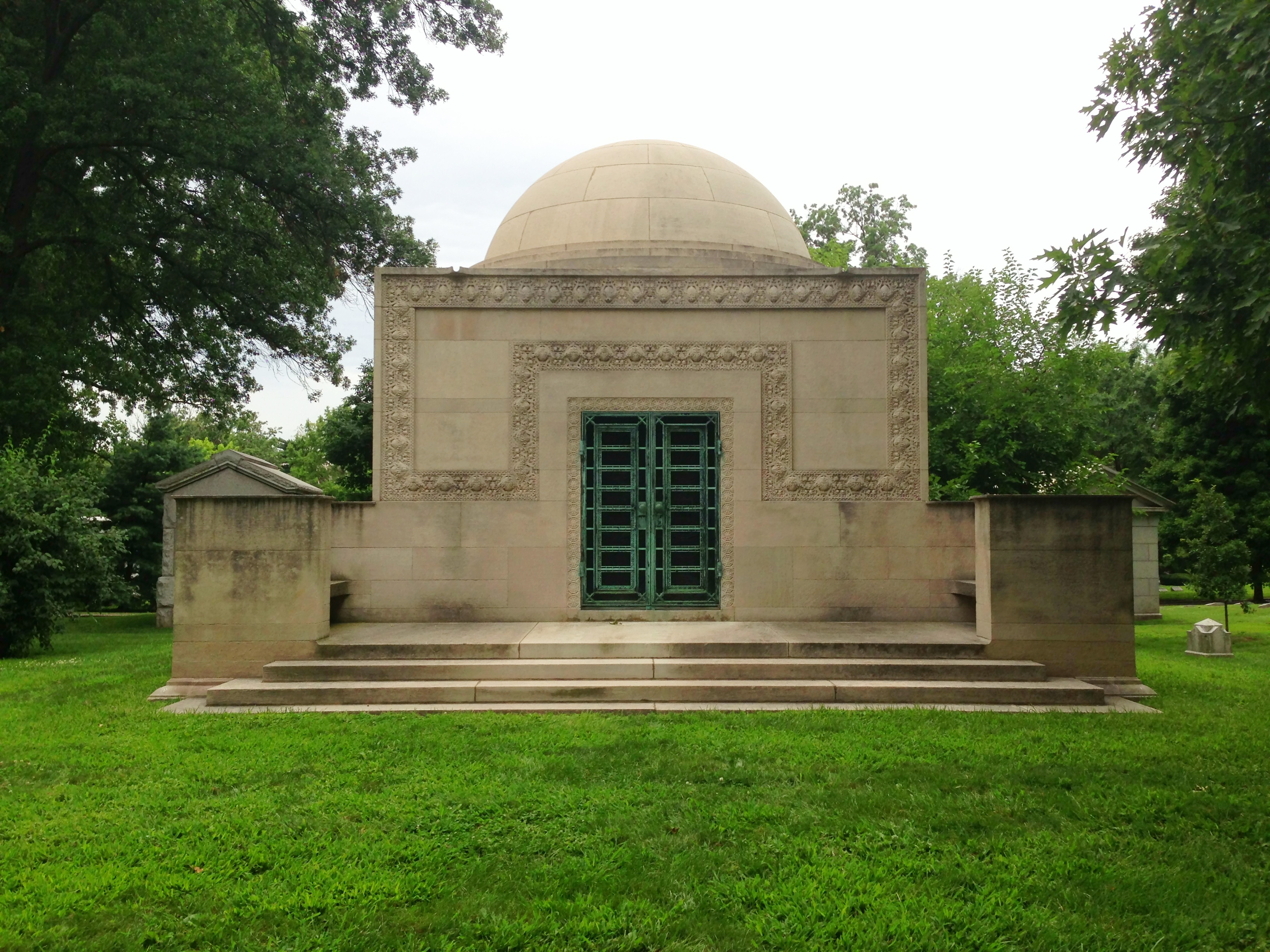
Wainwright Tomb, St. Louis

- Charlotte Dickson Wainwright Tomb, Bellefontaine Cemetery, St. Louis (1892), listed on the National Register of Historic Places, is considered a major American architectural triumph, a model for ecclesiastical architecture, a "masterpiece", and has been called "the Taj Mahal of St. Louis". The family name appears nowhere on the tomb.
- Union Trust Building, St. Louis (1893; street-level ornament heavily altered in 1924)
- Guaranty Building (formerly Prudential Building), Buffalo (1894)

Buildings 1887–1922 by Louis Sullivan: (256 total commissions and projects)

- Springer Block (later Bay State Building and Burnham Building) and Kranz Buildings, Chicago (1885–1887)
- Selz, Schwab & Company Factory, Chicago (1886–1887)
- Hebrew Manual Training School, Chicago (1889–1890)
- James H. Walker Warehouse & Company Store, Chicago (1886–1889)
- Warehouse for E. W. Blatchford, Chicago (1889)
- James Charnley House (also known as the Charnley–Persky House Museum and the National Headquarters of the Society of Architectural Historians), Chicago (1891–1892)
- Albert Sullivan Residence, Chicago (1891–1892)
- McVicker's Theater, second remodeling, Chicago (1890–1891)
- Bayard Building, (now Bayard-Condict Building), 65–69 Bleecker Street, New York City (1898). Sullivan's only building in New York, with a glazed terra cotta curtain wall expressing the steel structure behind it.
- Commercial Loft of Gage Brothers & Company, Chicago (1898–1900)
- Holy Trinity Orthodox Cathedral, Chicago (1900–1903)
- Carson Pirie Scott store, (originally known as the Schlesinger & Mayer Store, now known as "Sullivan Center") Chicago (1899–1904)
- Virginia Hall of Tusculum College, Greeneville, Tennessee (1901)
- Harold C. Bradley House, Madison, Wisconsin (1909) with George Grant Elmslie
- Van Allen Building, Clinton, Iowa (1914)
- St. Paul United Methodist Church, Cedar Rapids, Iowa (1910)
- Krause Music Store, Chicago (final commission 1922; front façade only)

=== Banks ===
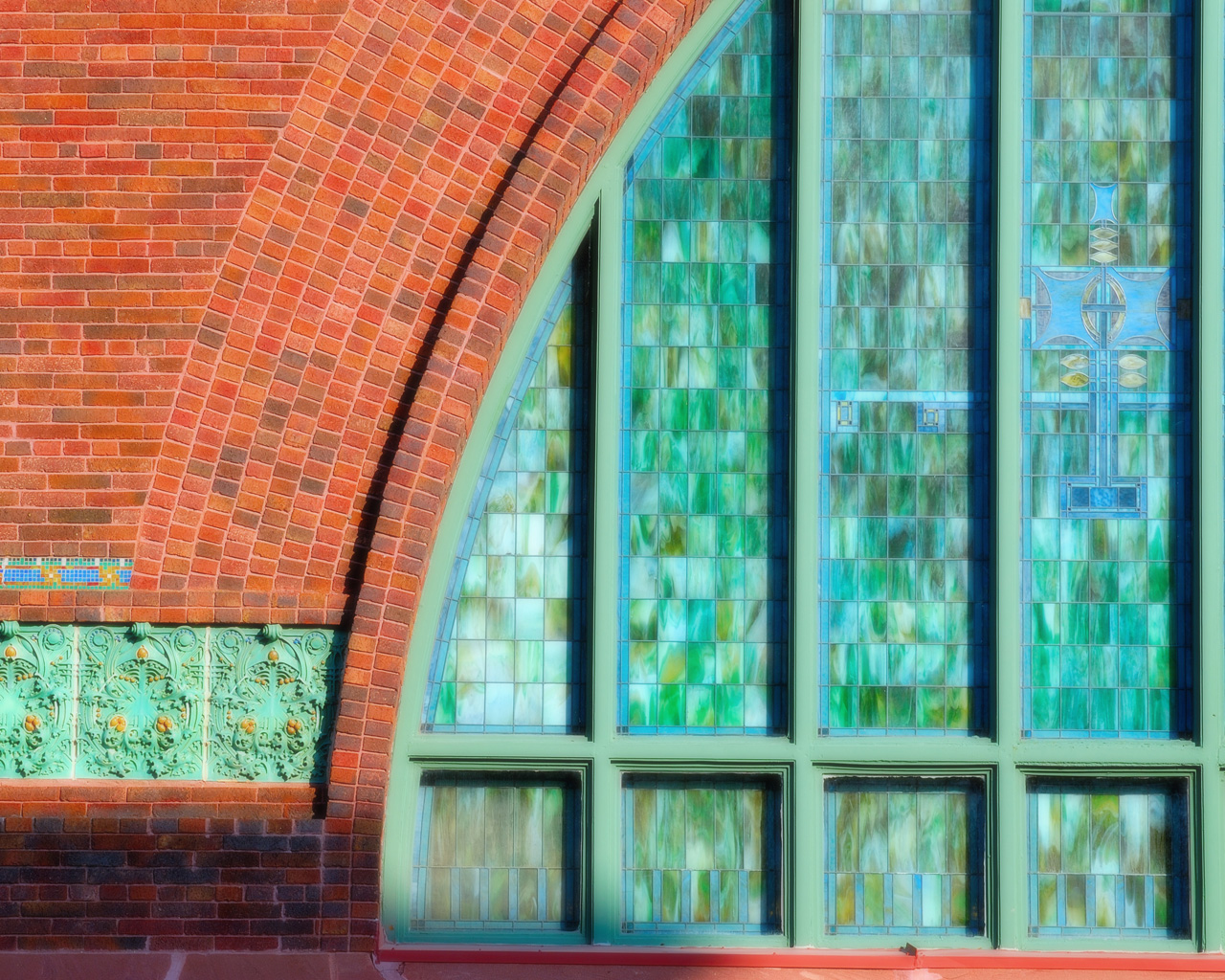
A portion of the western elevation of National Farmer's Bank, Owatonna, Minnesota (1908)

Sulliven's later output consisted primarily of a series of small bank and commercial buildings in the Midwest. When the director of a bank that was considering hiring him asked Sullivan why they should engage him at a cost higher than the bids received for a conventional Neo-Classic styled building from other architects, Sullivan is reported to have replied, "A thousand architects could design those buildings. Only I can design this one." He got the job. These commissions are collectively referred to as Sullivan's "Jewel Boxes", and all still stand.

- National Farmers' Bank of Owatonna, Owatonna, Minnesota (1908)
- Peoples Savings Bank, Cedar Rapids, Iowa (1912)
- Henry Adams Building, Algona, Iowa (1913)
- Merchants' National Bank, Grinnell, Iowa (1914)
- Home Building Association Company, Newark, Ohio (1914)
- Purdue State Bank, West Lafayette, Indiana (1914)
- People's Federal Savings and Loan Association, Sidney, Ohio (1918)
- Farmers and Merchants UNion Bank, Columbus, Wisconsin (1919)

Separately, Sullivan designed the First National Bank in Manistique, Michigan (1919–1920), a remodeling of an existing bank building.

=== Lost buildings ===
- Grand Opera House, Chicago, 1880 remodel and reconstruction with Dankmar Adler as lead architect and Sullivan as assistant; later remodeled and reconstructed in 1926 by Andrew Rebori; demolished May 1962
- Washington Elementary School, Marengo, Illinois, Adler & Sullivan, 1883, demolished by early 1990s
- Pueblo Opera House, Pueblo, Colorado, 1890, destroyed by fire 1922
- New Orleans Union Station, 1892, demolished 1954
- Dooly Block, Salt Lake City, Utah, 1891, demolished 1965

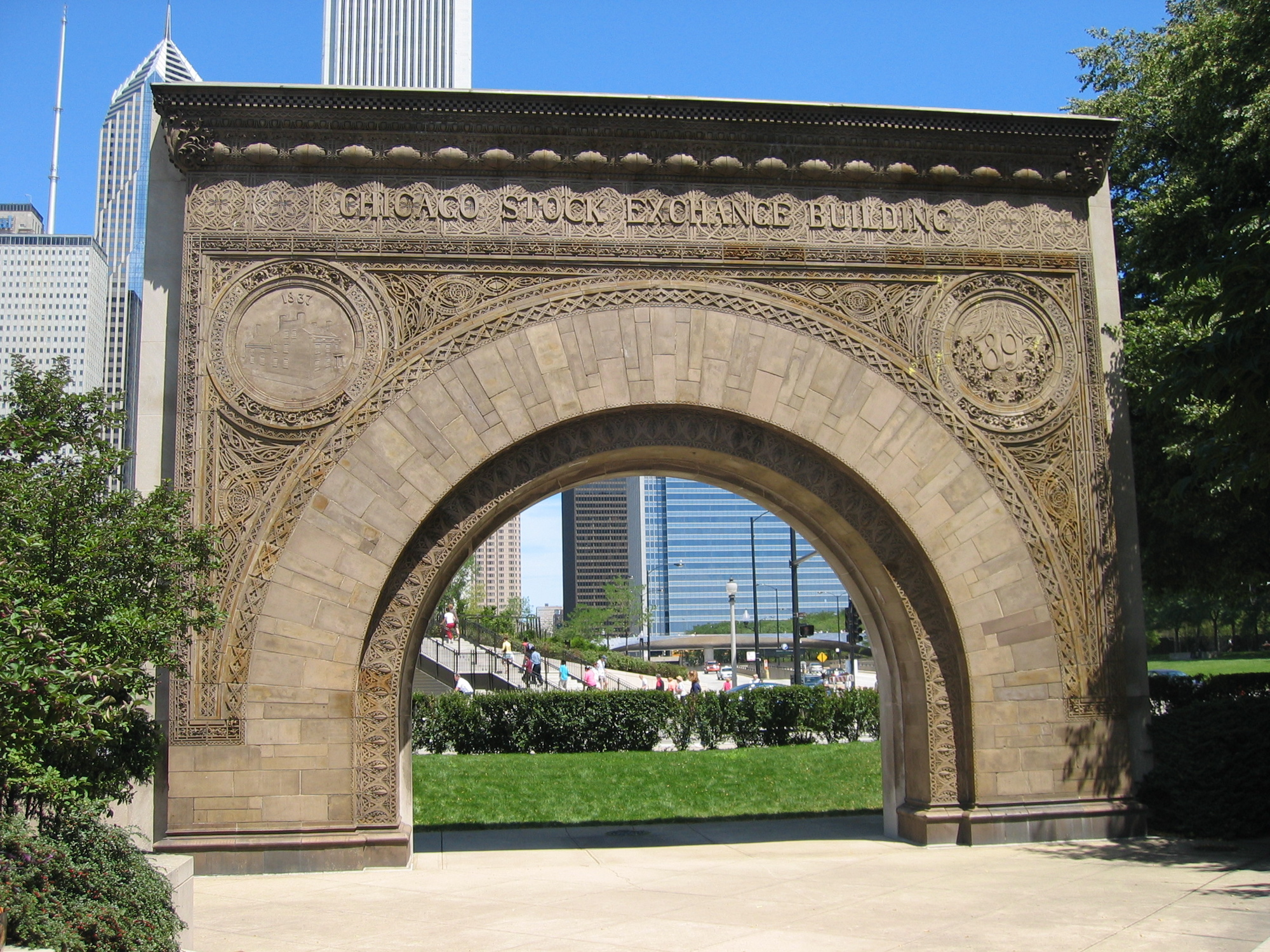
Entrance from Sullivan's 1893 Chicago Stock Exchange building, saved and reinstalled at The Art Institute of Chicago

- Chicago Stock Exchange Building, Adler & Sullivan, 1893, demolished 1972

The entrance and other portions of the building were removed prior to the demolition and subsequently were restored in the Art Institute of Chicago in 1977; the entryway arch (seen at right) stands outside on the northeast corner of the AIC site

- Zion Temple, Chicago, 1884, demolished 1954
- Troescher Building, Chicago, 1884, demolished 1978
- Transportation Building, World's Columbian Exposition, Chicago, Adler & Sullivan, 1893–94, an exposition building built to last a year
- Louis Sullivan and Charnley Cottages, Ocean Springs, Mississippi, destroyed in Hurricane Katrina; Frank Lloyd Wright also claimed credit for the design
- Schiller Building (later Garrick Theater), Chicago, Adler & Sullivan, 1891, demolished 1961
- Third McVickers Theater, Chicago, Adler & Sullivan, 1883? demolished 1922
- Thirty-Ninth Street Passenger Station, Chicago, Adler & Sullivan, 1886, demolished 1934
- Standard Club, Chicago, Adler & Sullivan, 1887–88, demolished 1931
- Pilgrim Baptist Church, Chicago, Adler & Sullivan, 1891, destroyed by fire January 6, 2006
- Wirt Dexter Building, Chicago, Adler & Sullivan, 1887, destroyed by fire October 24, 2006
- George Harvey House, Chicago, Adler & Sullivan, 1888 destroyed by fire November 4, 2006

== Gallery ==
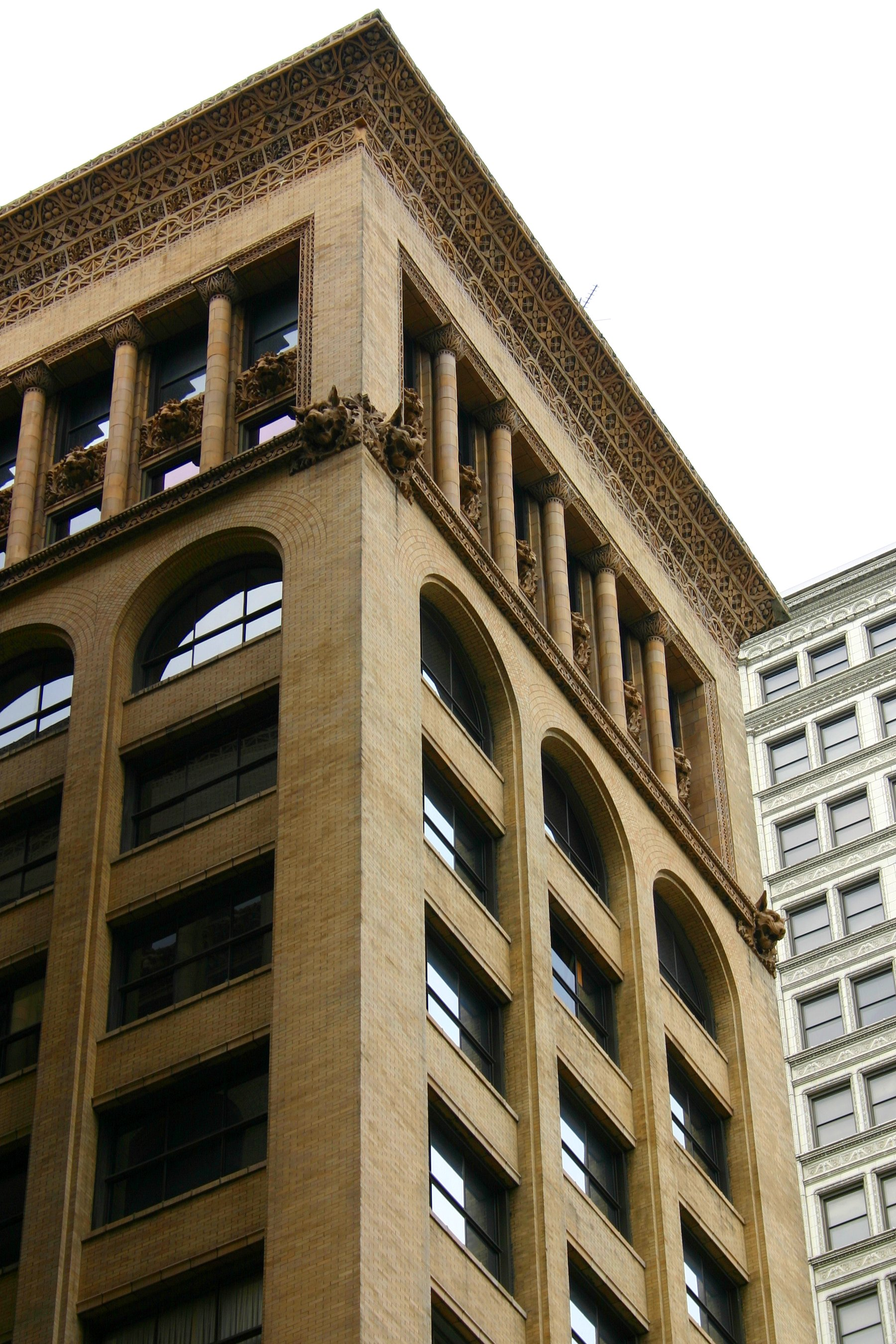
Union Trust Building

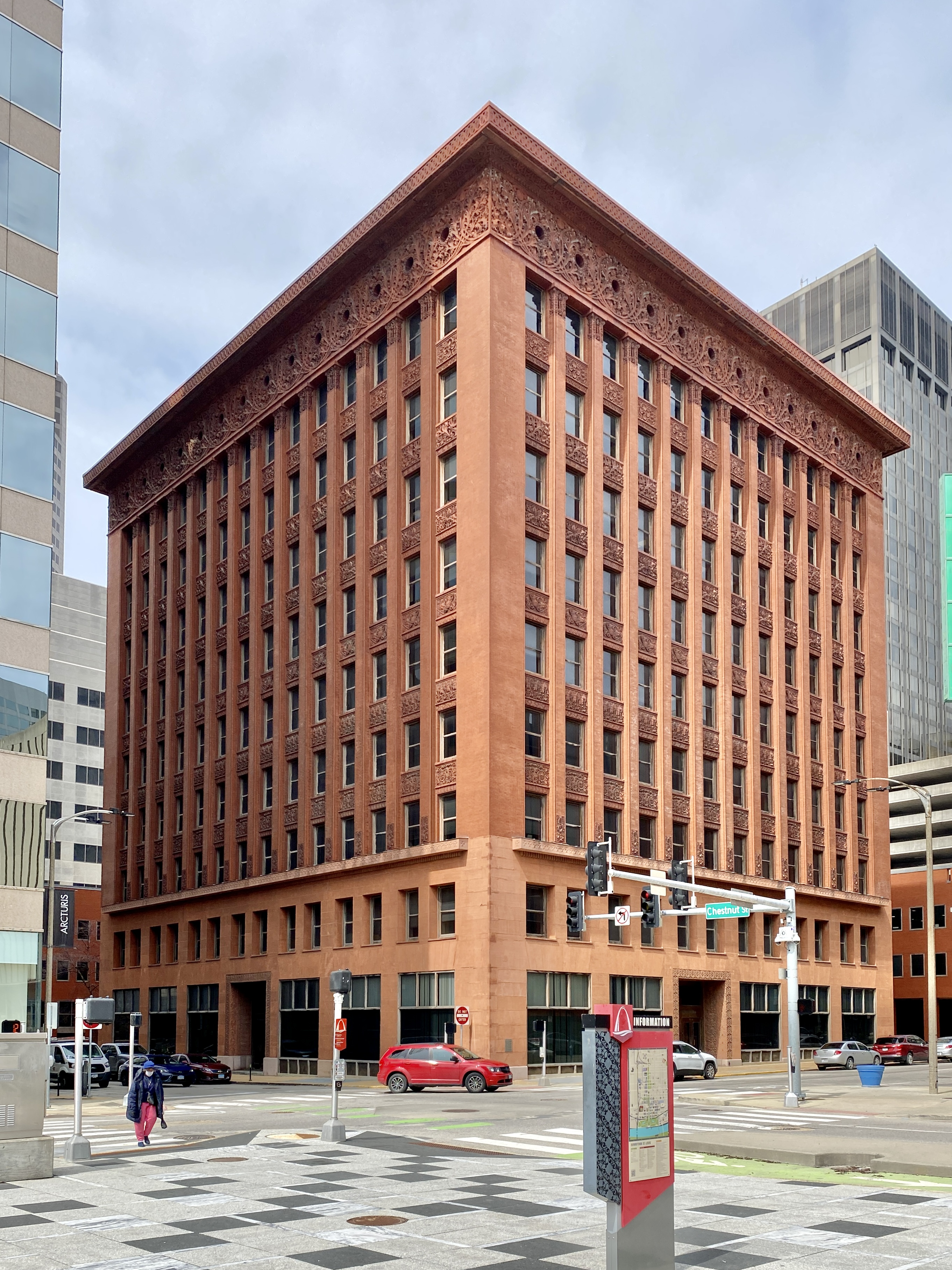
Wainwright Building

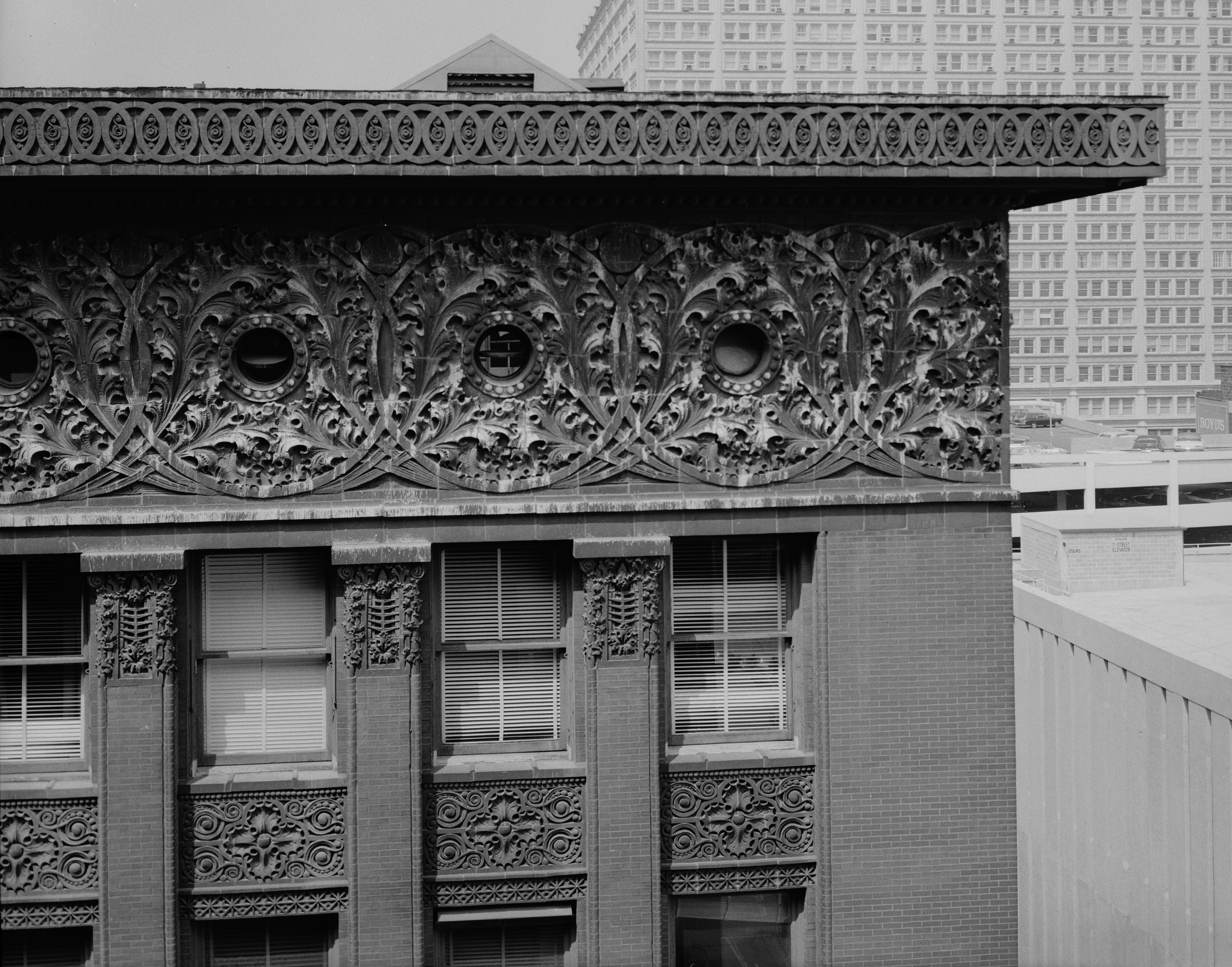
Wainwright Building cornice

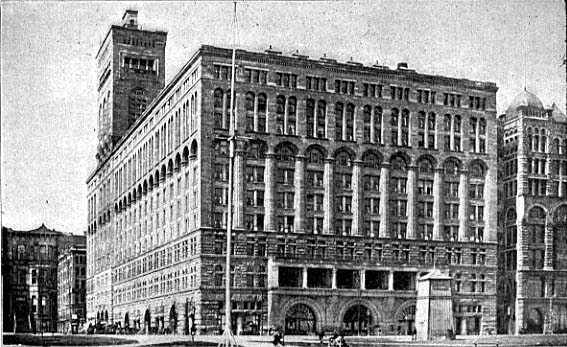
Auditorium Building

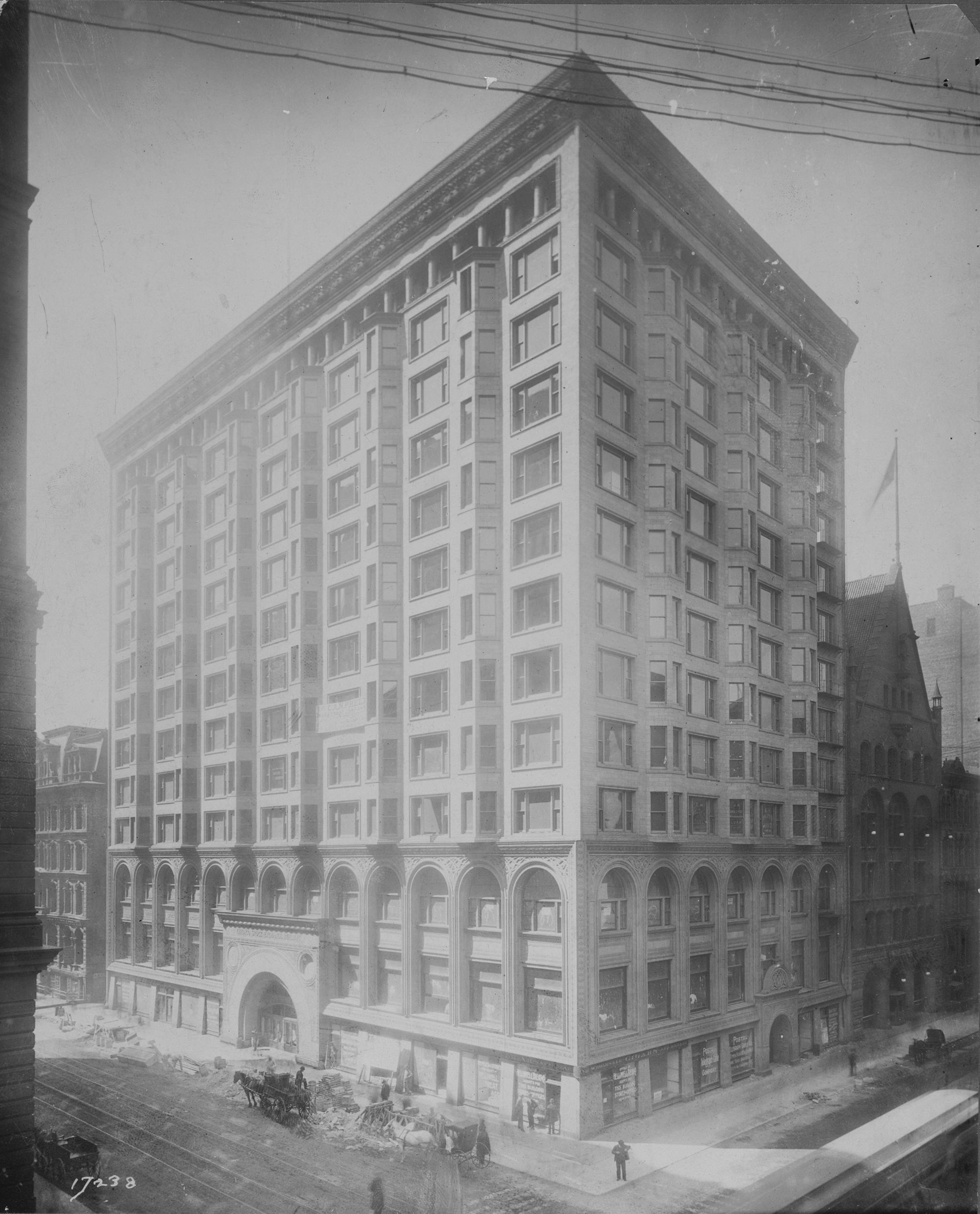
Chicago Stock Exchange Building

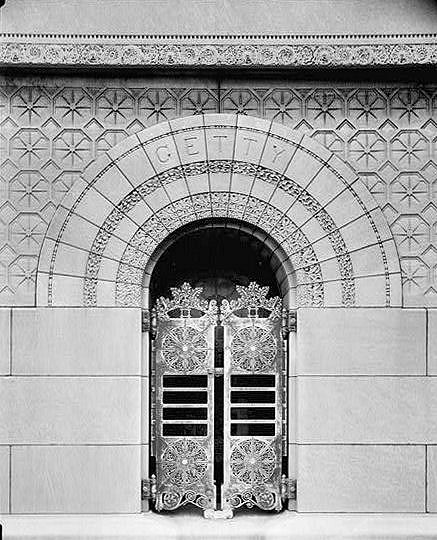
Getty Tomb

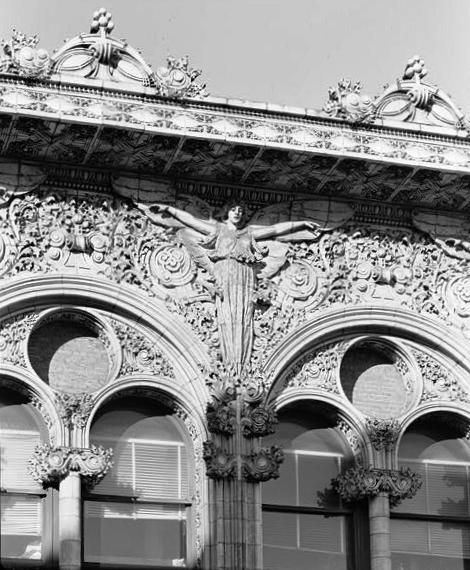
Bayard-Condict Building

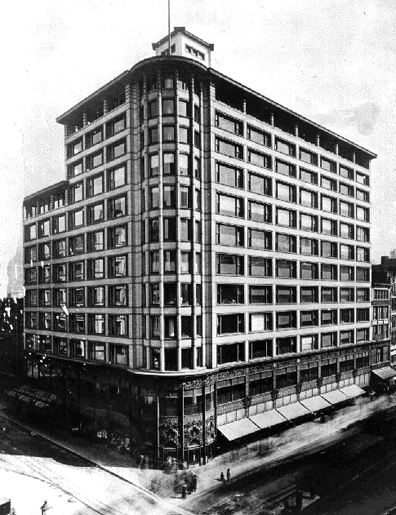
Carson Pirie Scott store

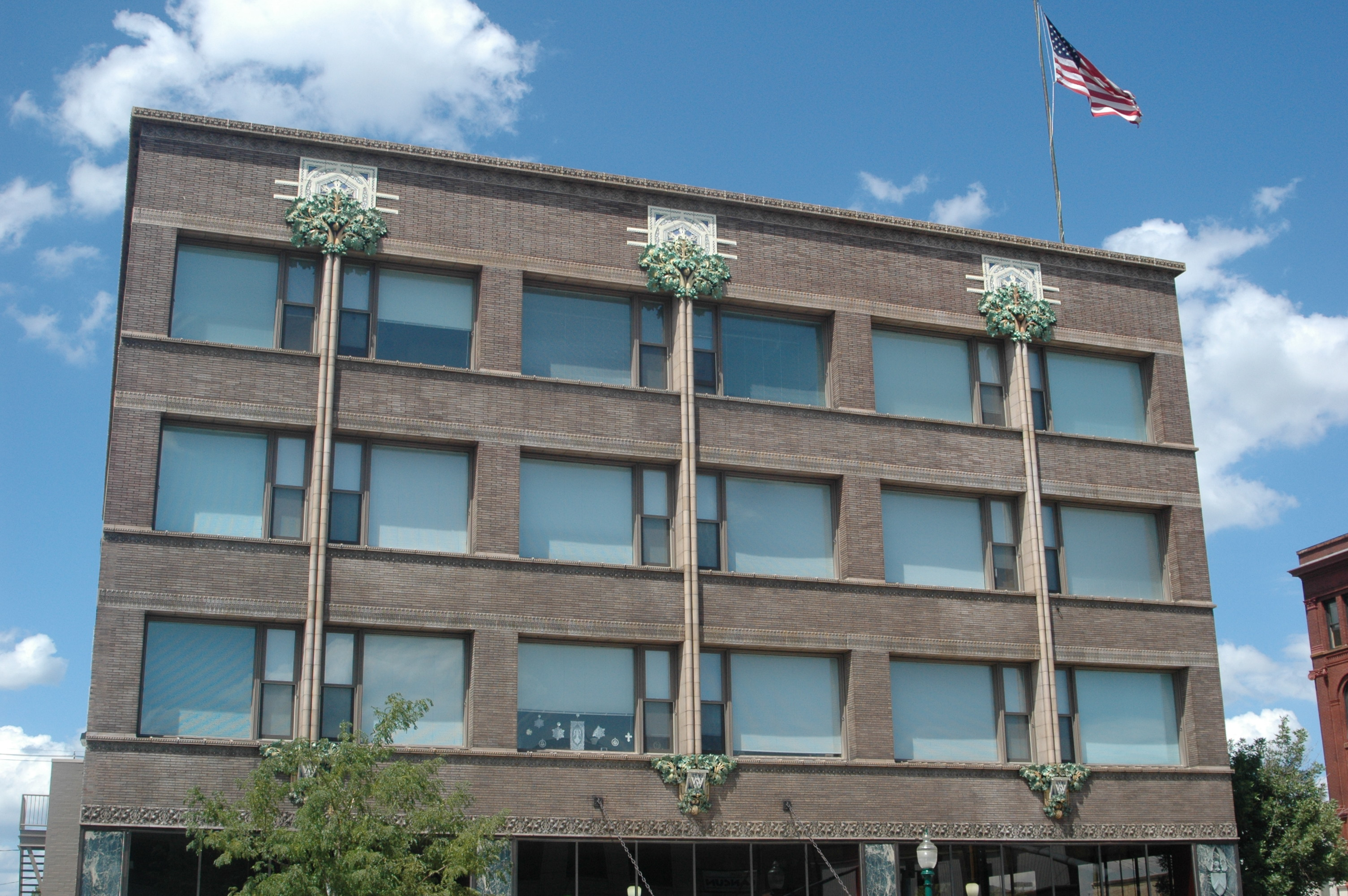
The Van Allen Building

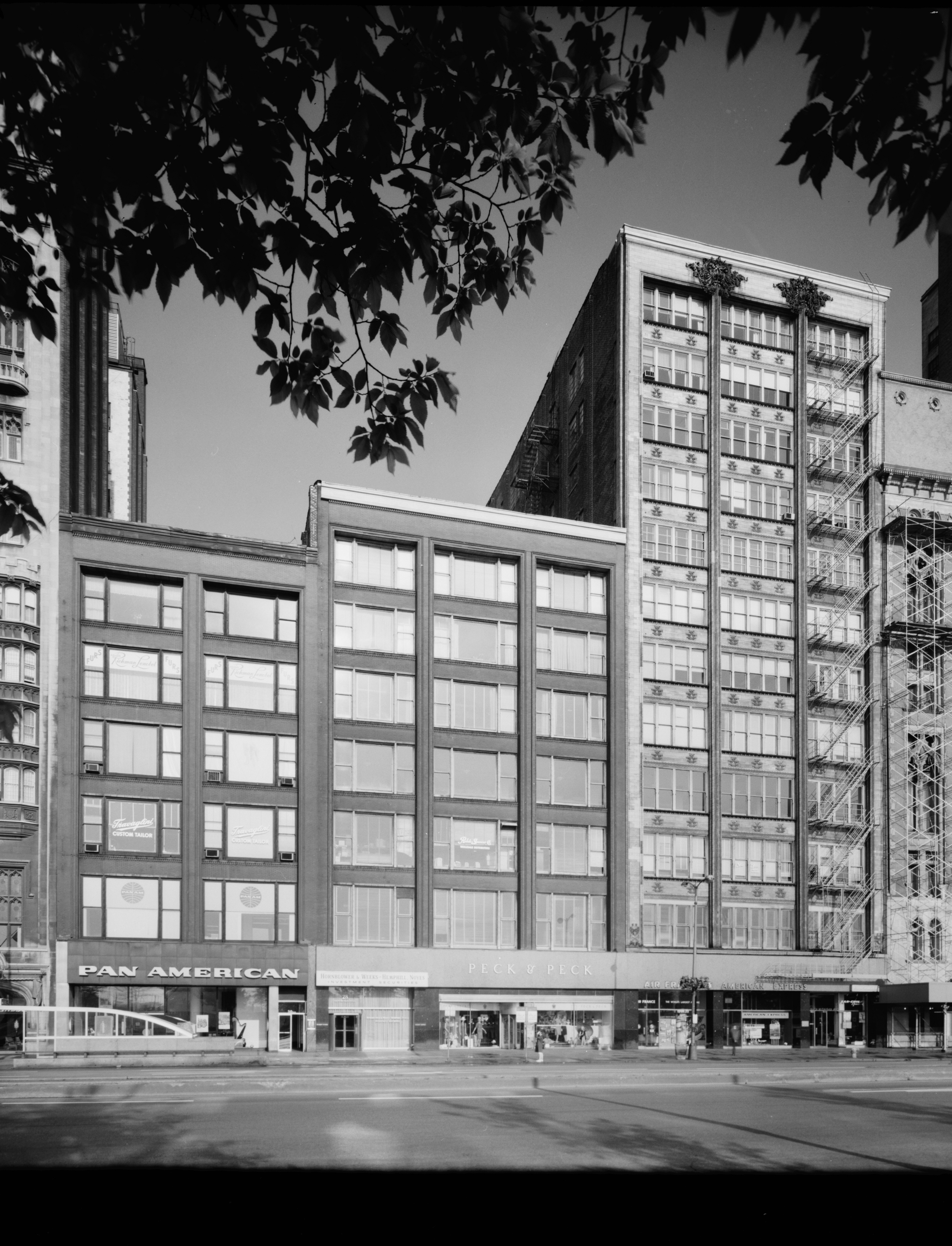
Gage Building (on right)

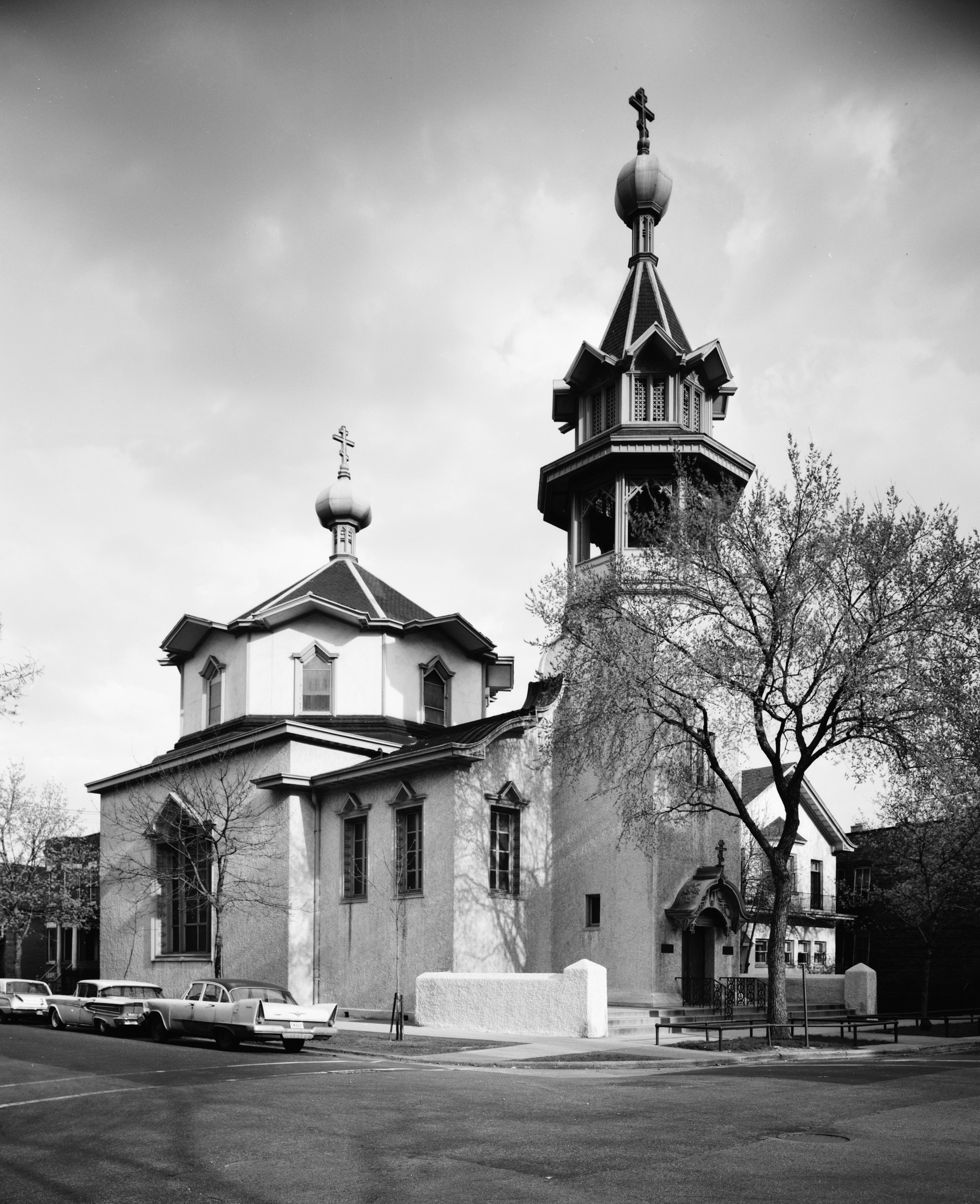
Holy Trinity Orthodox Cathedral, exterior

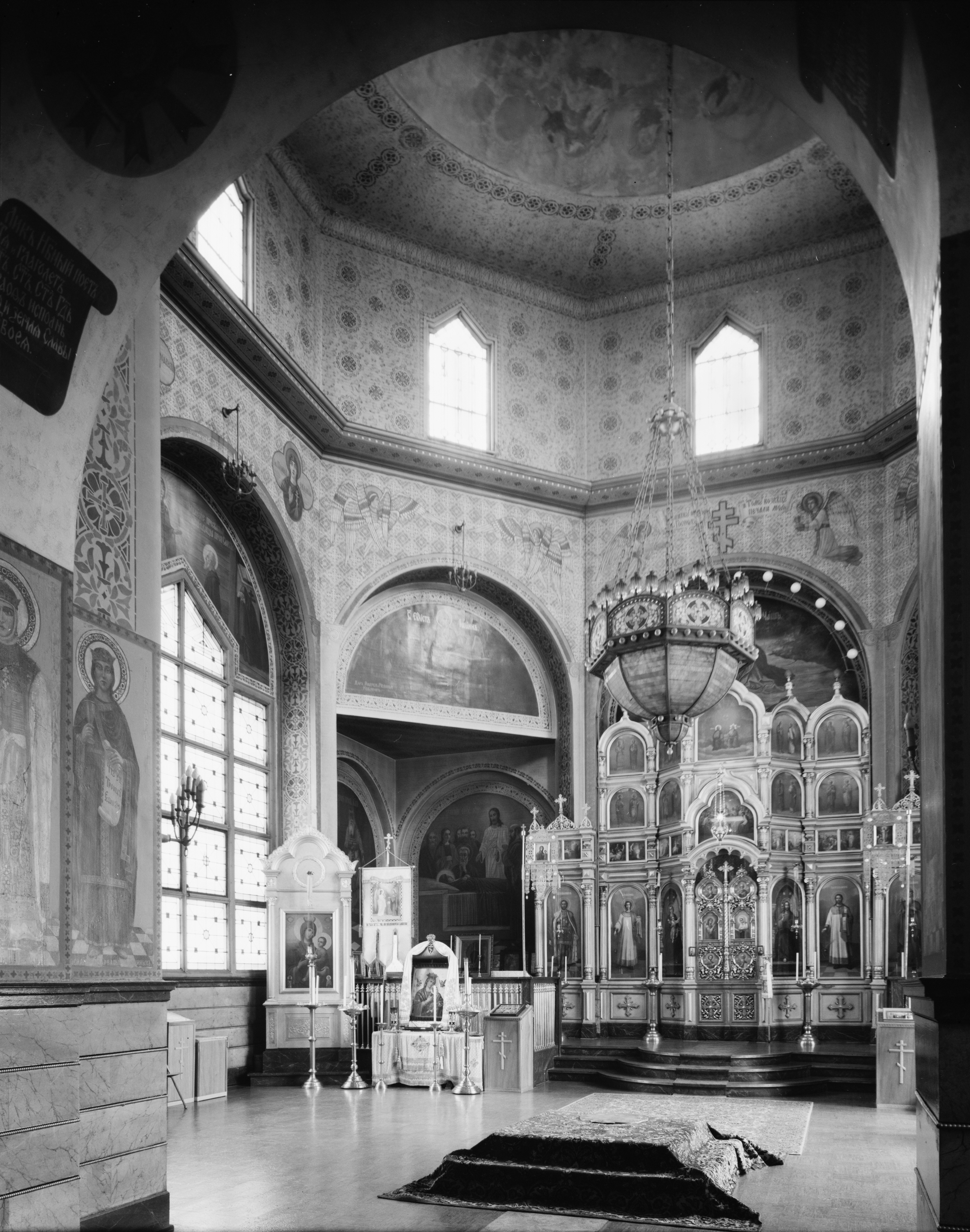
Holy Trinity Orthodox Cathedral, interior

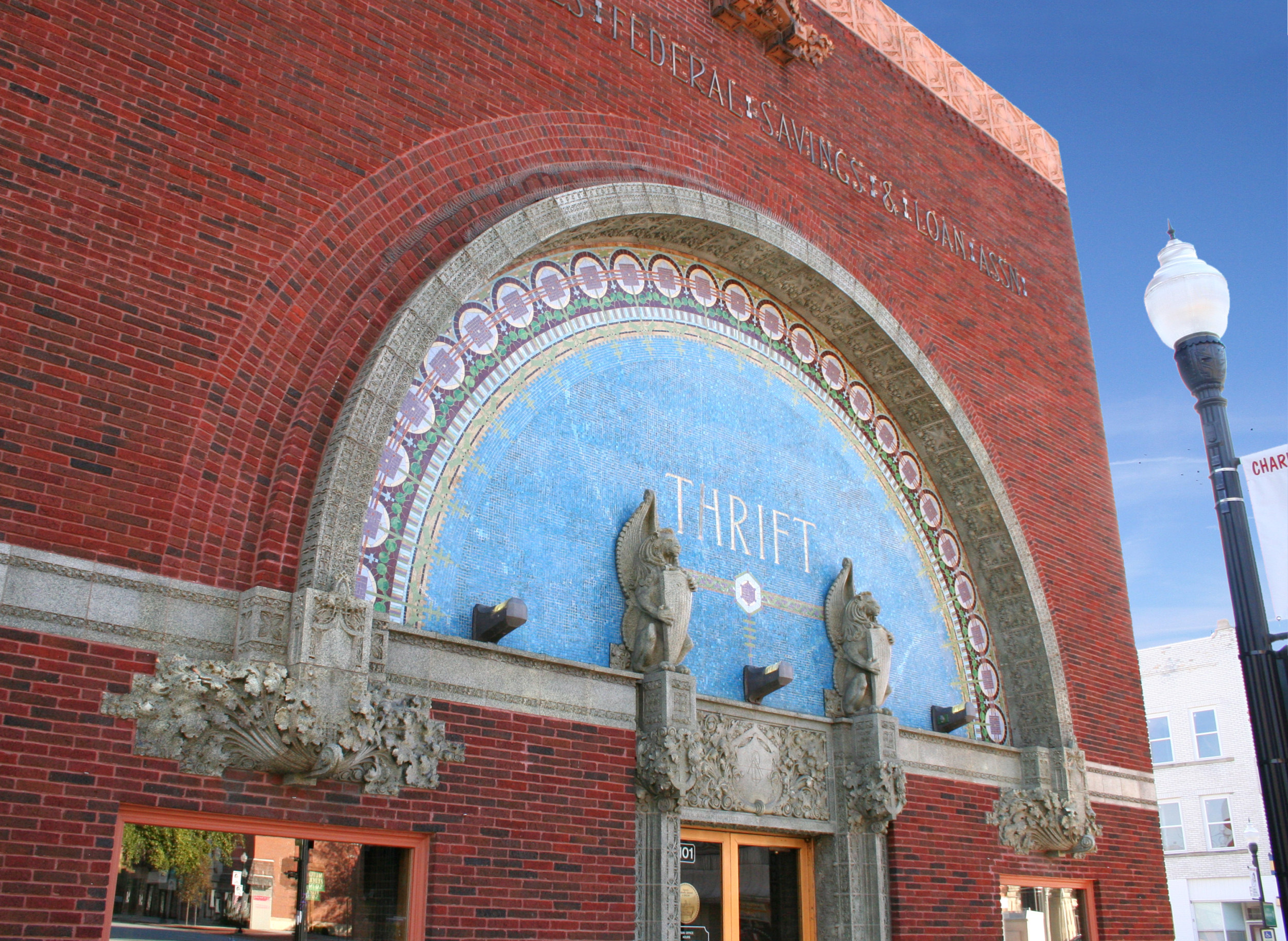
People's Federal Savings and Loan Association

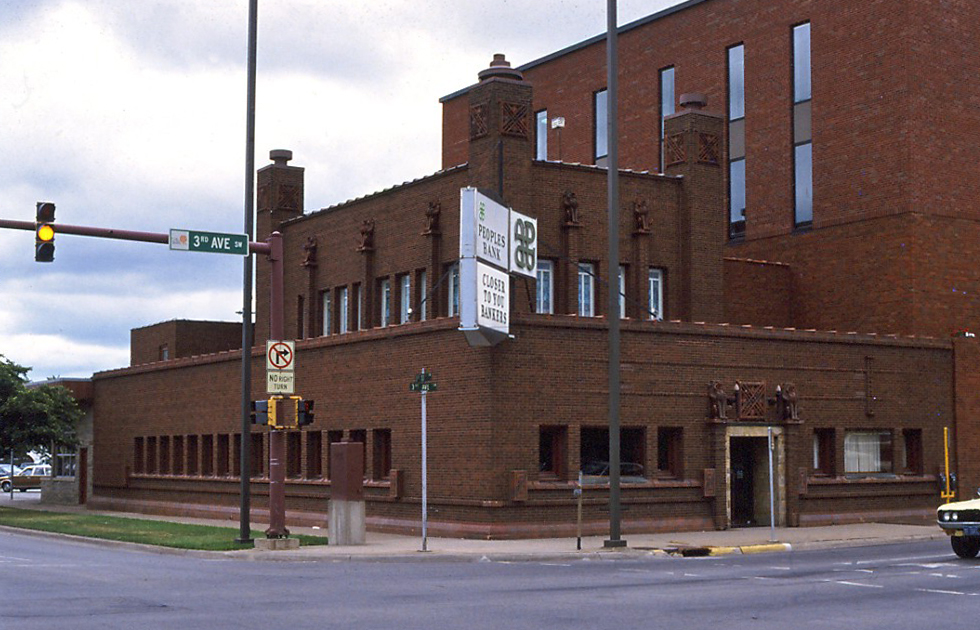
Peoples Savings Bank

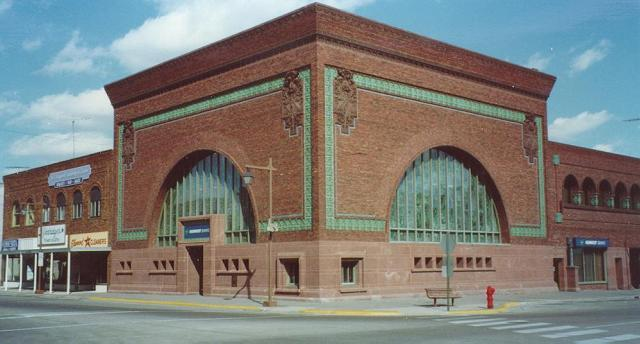
National Farmers' Bank of Owatonna

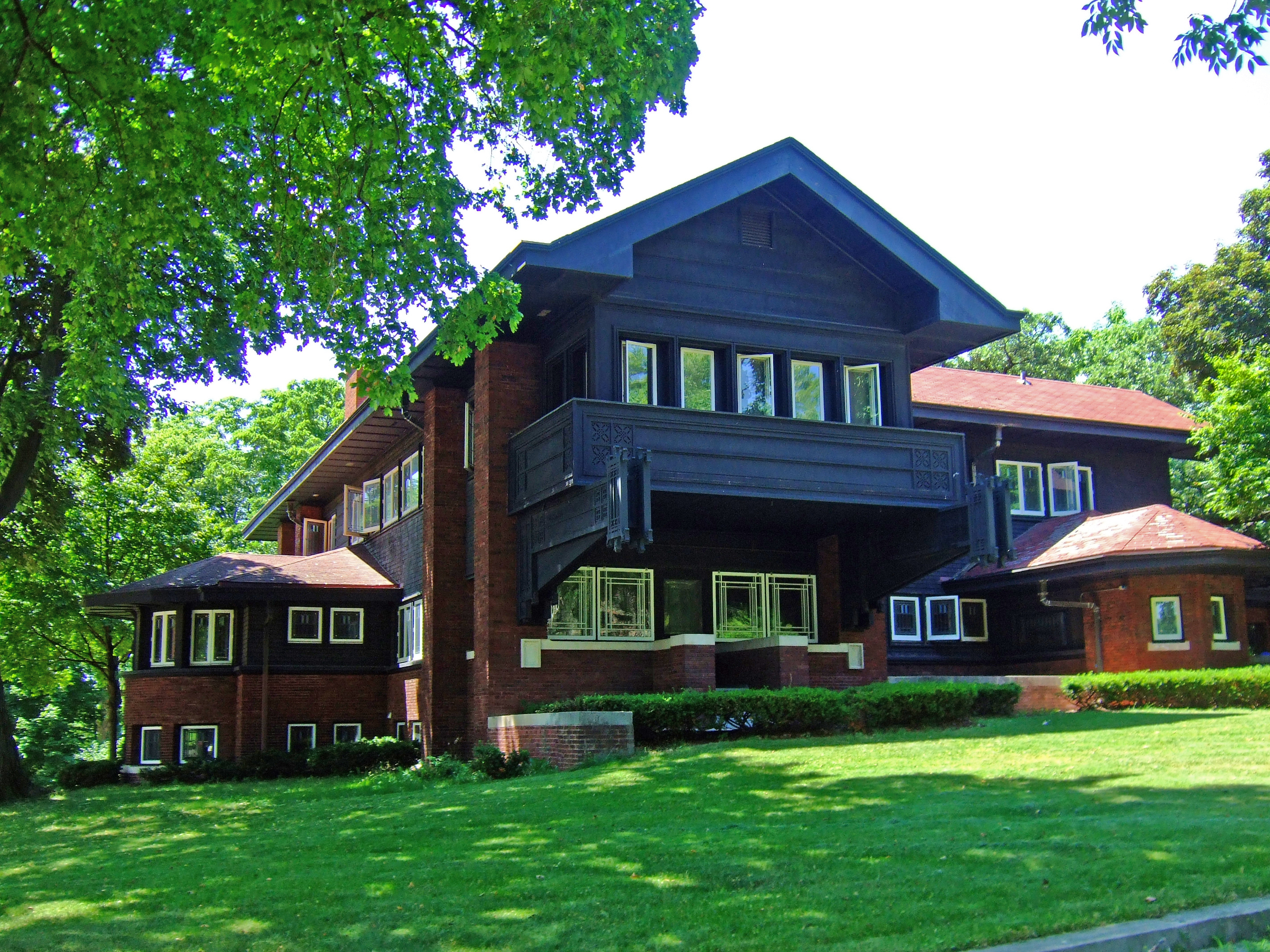
Harold C. Bradley House, Wisconsin

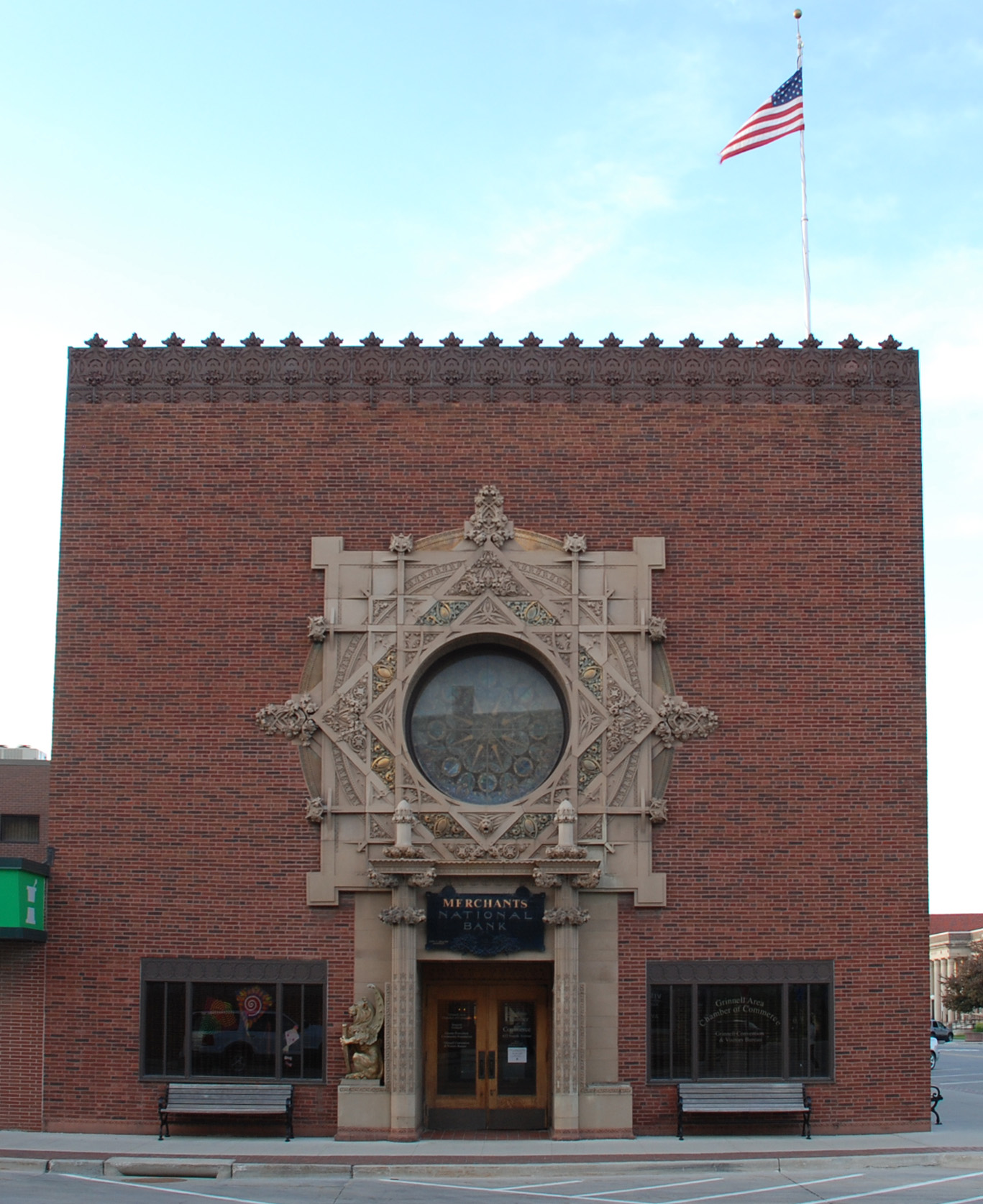
Merchants' National Bank, Grinnell, Iowa

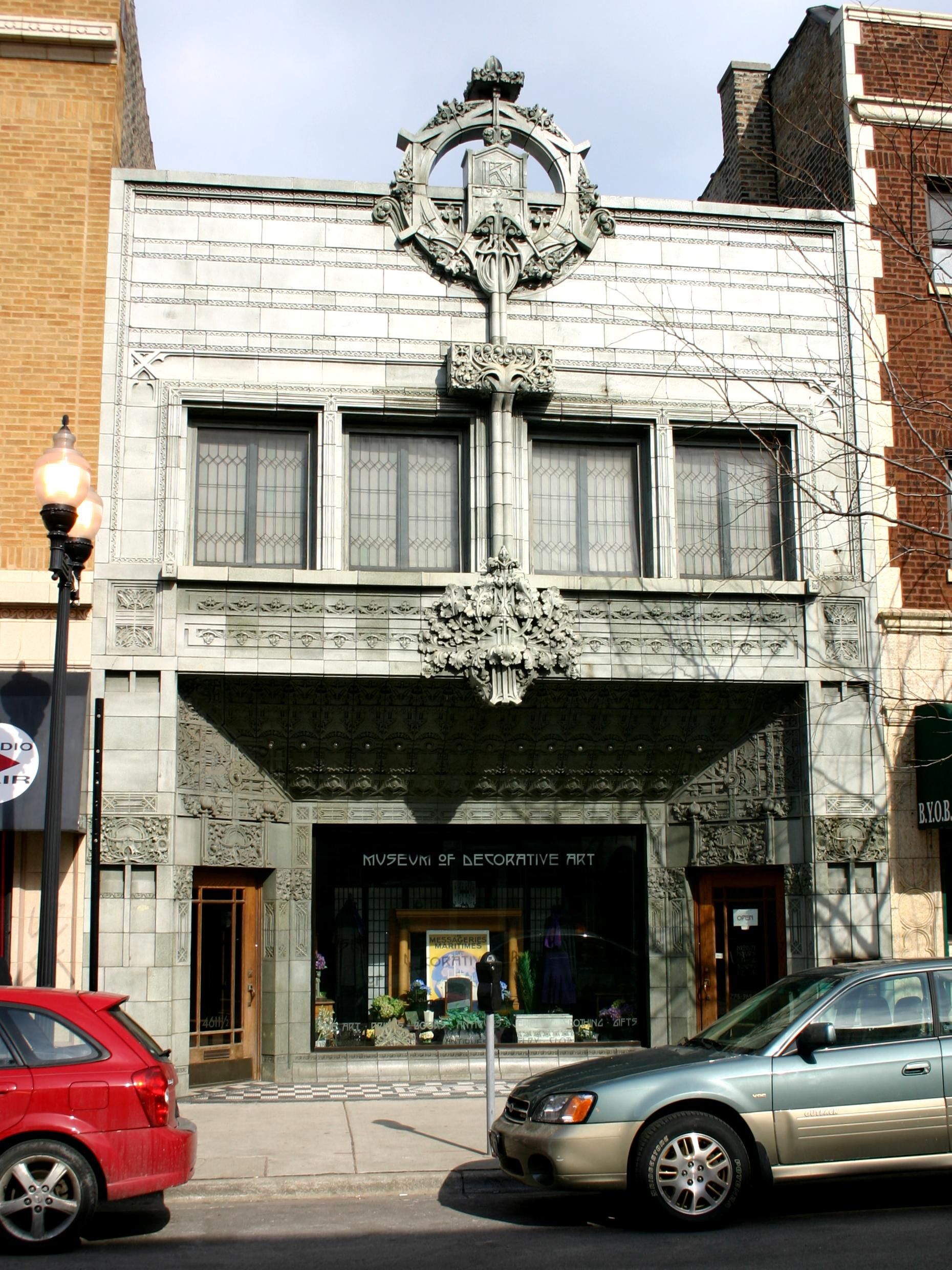
Krause Music Store

Farmers and Merchants Union Bank, Columbus, Wisconsin

== See also ==
- American Prize for Architecture
- Richard Bock
- Tall: The American Skyscraper and Louis Sullivan
