= Gage Group Buildings =

Buildings in Chicago, Illinois

- Gage Group—Ascher, Keith, and Gage Buildings
- U.S. National Register of Historic Places
- U.S. Historic district – Contributing property
- Chicago Landmark
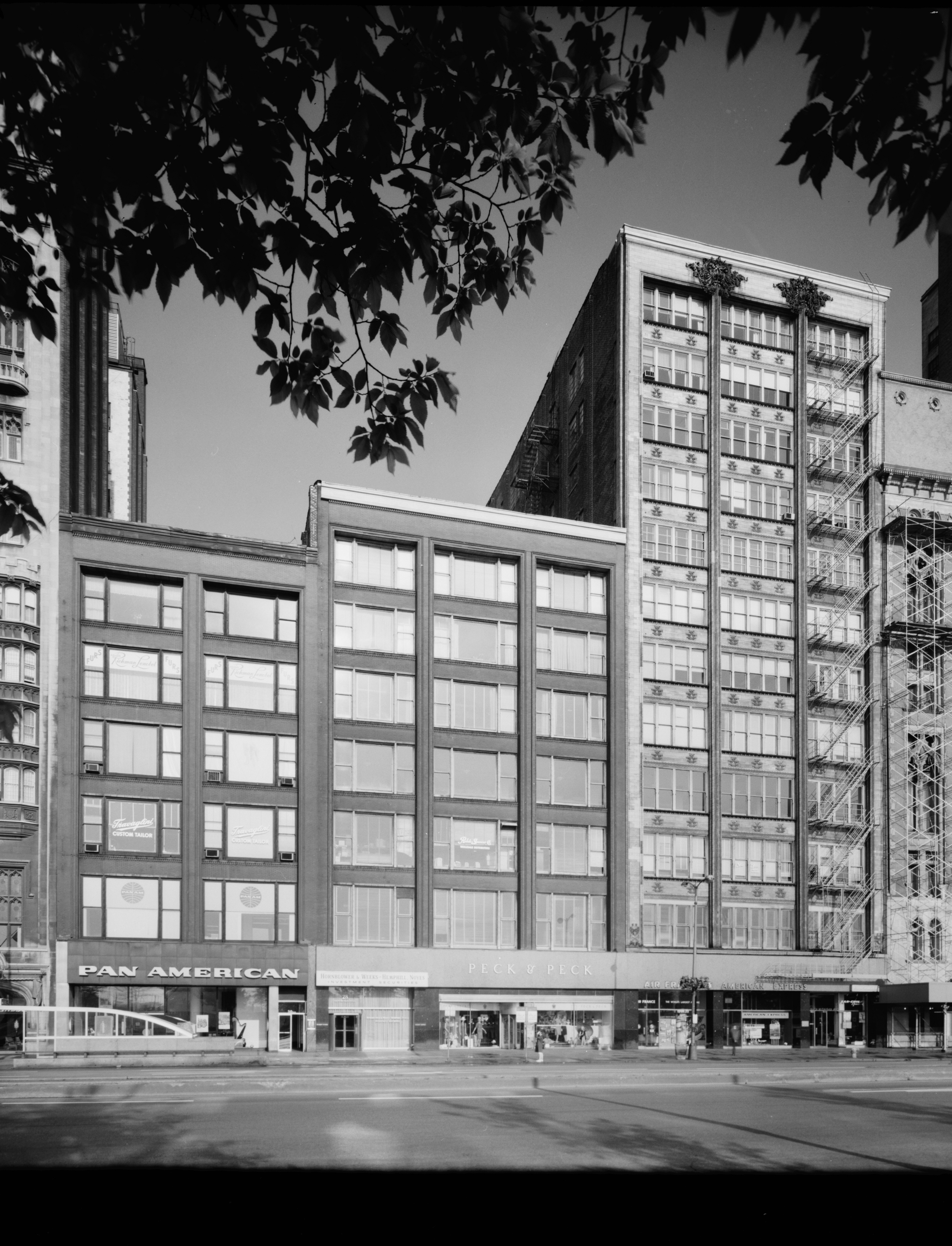
- Gage Group Buildings (left to right: 30, 24, and 18 S. Michigan Avenue); the rightmost's façade is by Louis Sullivan.
- Location: Chicago, Illinois
- Coordinates: 41°52′52.36″N 87°38′13.01″W
- Built: 1898
- Architect: Holabird & Roche; Sullivan, Louis H.
- Architectural style: Chicago
- NRHP reference No.: 85002840

Significant dates
- Added to NRHP: November 14, 1985
- Designated CHICL: September 15, 1976

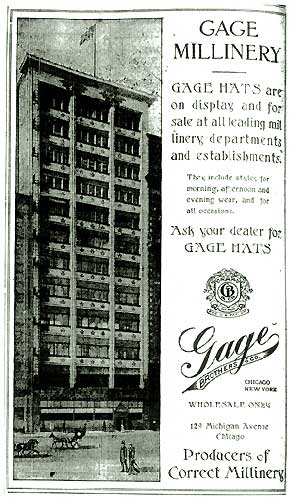
The Gage Building illustrated in the February 7, 1909 Chicago Sunday Tribune

The Gage Group Buildings consist of three buildings located at 18, 24 and 30 S. Michigan Avenue, between Madison Street and Monroe Street, in Chicago, Illinois. They were built from 1890–1899, designed by Holabird & Roche for the three millinery firms - Gage, Keith and Ascher. The building at 18 S. Michigan Avenue has an ornamental façade designed by Louis Sullivan. It was listed on the National Register of Historic Places on November 14, 1985, and was designated a Chicago Landmark on September 11, 1996. In addition, it is a historic district contributing property for the Chicago Landmark Historic Michigan Boulevard District.

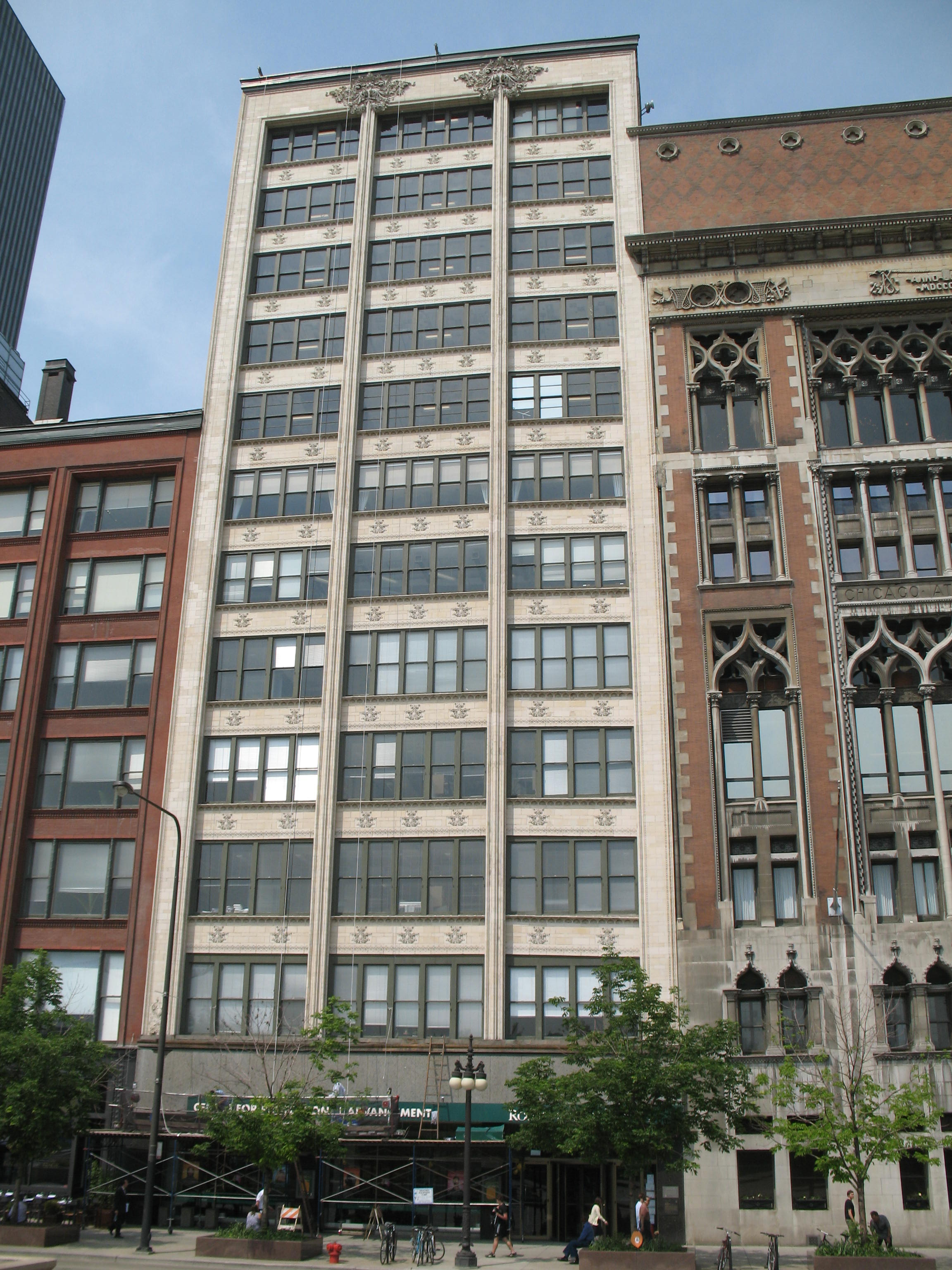
May 30, 2007 view of building

The façades of these buildings demonstrate two different approaches to the Chicago School, a design movement that led to the creation of modern commercial architecture. The buildings by Holabird & Roche are straightforward, while the facade designed by Sullivan exemplifies his more expressive approach.

The tallest building is known as "18 South Michigan Avenue" and was previously called the Gage Brothers and Company Building. Before the Chicago street addresses were changed in 1909, the building had the address of 130 S. Michigan Avenue. The ornamental flourishes at the top of Sullivan's façade were pushed upwards when four stories were added in 1902 by different architects. This is one of only five buildings in Chicago designed by Louis Sullivan as a solo architect that are still standing.

The two smaller buildings to the south are also part of the Gage Group Buildings. The Edson Keith and Company Building is connected to the Gage Building and is located at 24 S. Michigan Avenue. The Theodore Ascher and Company Building is also known as the 30 South Michigan Building.

== See also ==
- National Register of Historic Places listings in Central Chicago
- Chicago architecture
