= Building at 1209–1217 Maple Avenue =

- U.S. National Register of Historic Places
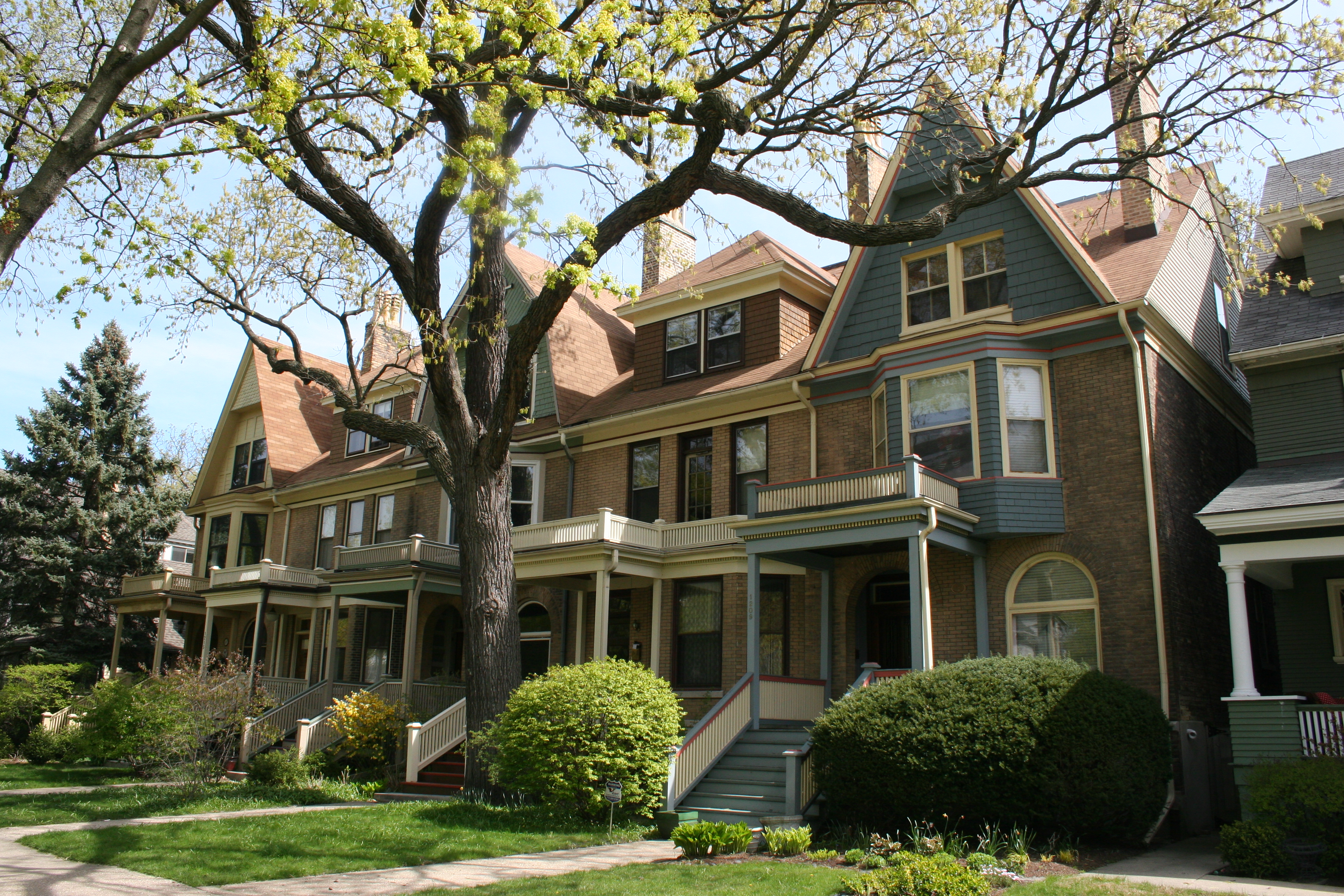

- Location within Chicago metropolitan area Location within Illinois Location within the United States
- Location: 1209–1217 Maple Ave., Evanston, Illinois
- Coordinates: 42°02′24″N 87°41′06″W
- Area: 0.3 acres (0.12 ha)
- Built: 1892
- Architect: Holabird & Roche
- Architectural style: Queen Anne
- MPS: Suburban Apartment Buildings in Evanston TR
- NRHP reference No.: 84000964
- Added to NRHP: March 15, 1984

The Building at 1209–1217 Maple Avenue is a historic rowhouse building in Evanston, Illinois. Built in 1892, the three-story building consists of five rowhouses. The building was one of several rowhouses built in Evanston in the late nineteenth century; the rowhouses were a precursor to the city's wave of suburban apartments, which also offered house-like living in a multi-unit building. Prominent Chicago architects Holabird & Roche designed the building in the Queen Anne style. The building features porches at each unit's entrance, projecting bays, and a gambrel gable and two triangular gables separated by dormers.

The building was added to the National Register of Historic Places on March 15, 1984.
