= Hotel Saint Louis =

- Union Trust Company Building
- U.S. National Register of Historic Places
- St. Louis Landmark
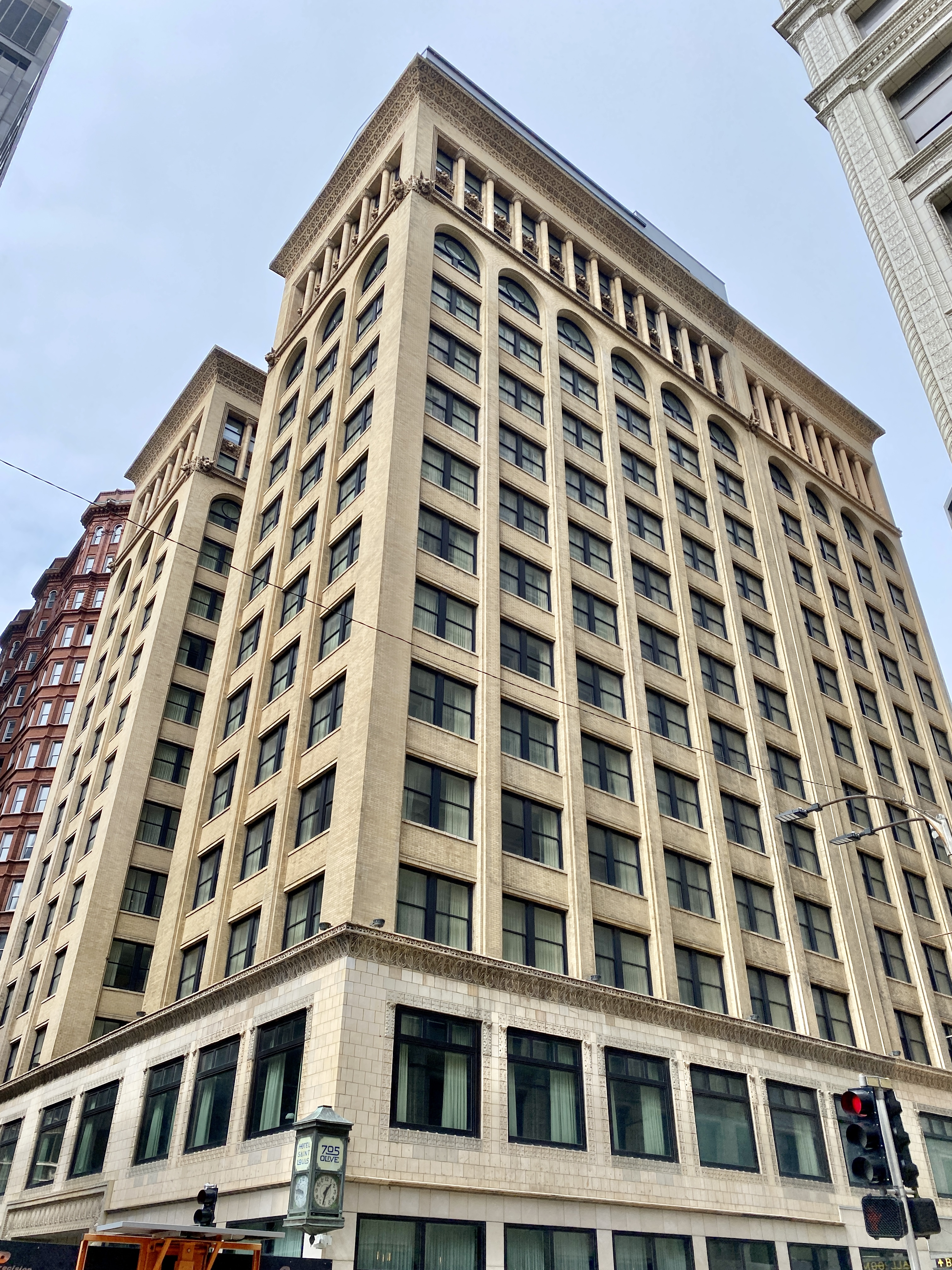
- Interactive map of Union Trust Company Building
- Location: 705 Olive St., St. Louis, Missouri
- Coordinates: 38.628607°N 90.191533°W
- Built: 1892-1893
- Architect: Adler & Sullivan
- NRHP reference No.: 82004743
- STLL No.: 30
- Added to NRHP: June 17, 1982

The Hotel Saint Louis is a hotel and historic building in St. Louis, Missouri. The building was designed by the firm Adler & Sullivan and was constructed from 1892 to 1893. The structure is listed as the Union Trust Company Building on the National Register of Historic Places and became a City Landmark in 1971.

The building has 14 stories, a steel frame, and a buff brick and terra cotta exterior. It is the only building by the firm to contain an exterior light court. The building also has a 14-story addition on its northeast side, designed by Eames & Young, built in 1905 and adhering to the original design.

The first two stories of the building originally had ornate decorative elements. These included a large arched main entrance flanked by sculptural heraldic lions holding shields, with additional sculptural lions at the corners of the building. The unique ornamentation also included large round windows on the second story. All of these decorative elements were removed in either 1924 or 1927, replaced with more conventional exterior elements.

Gallery

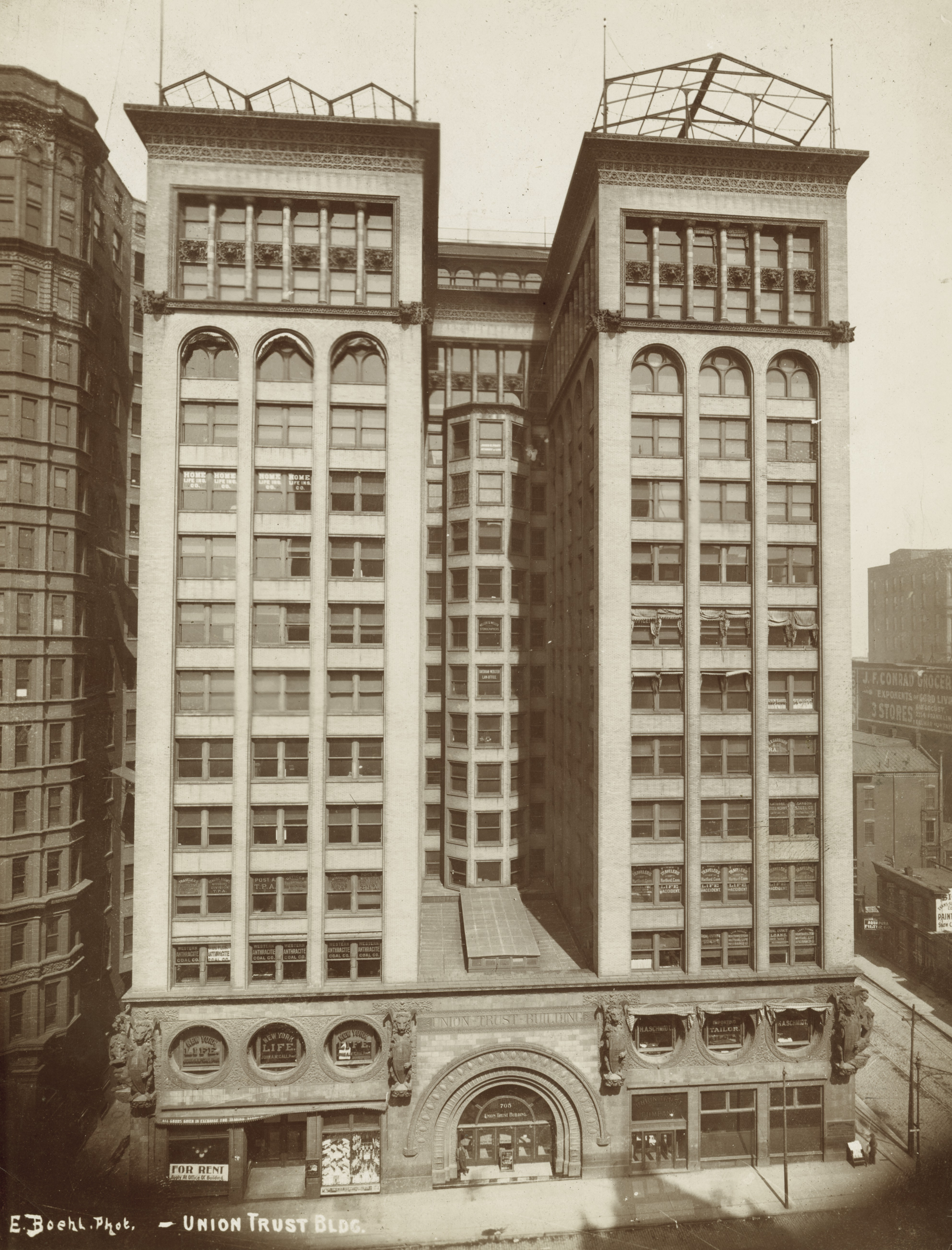
The building in 1894

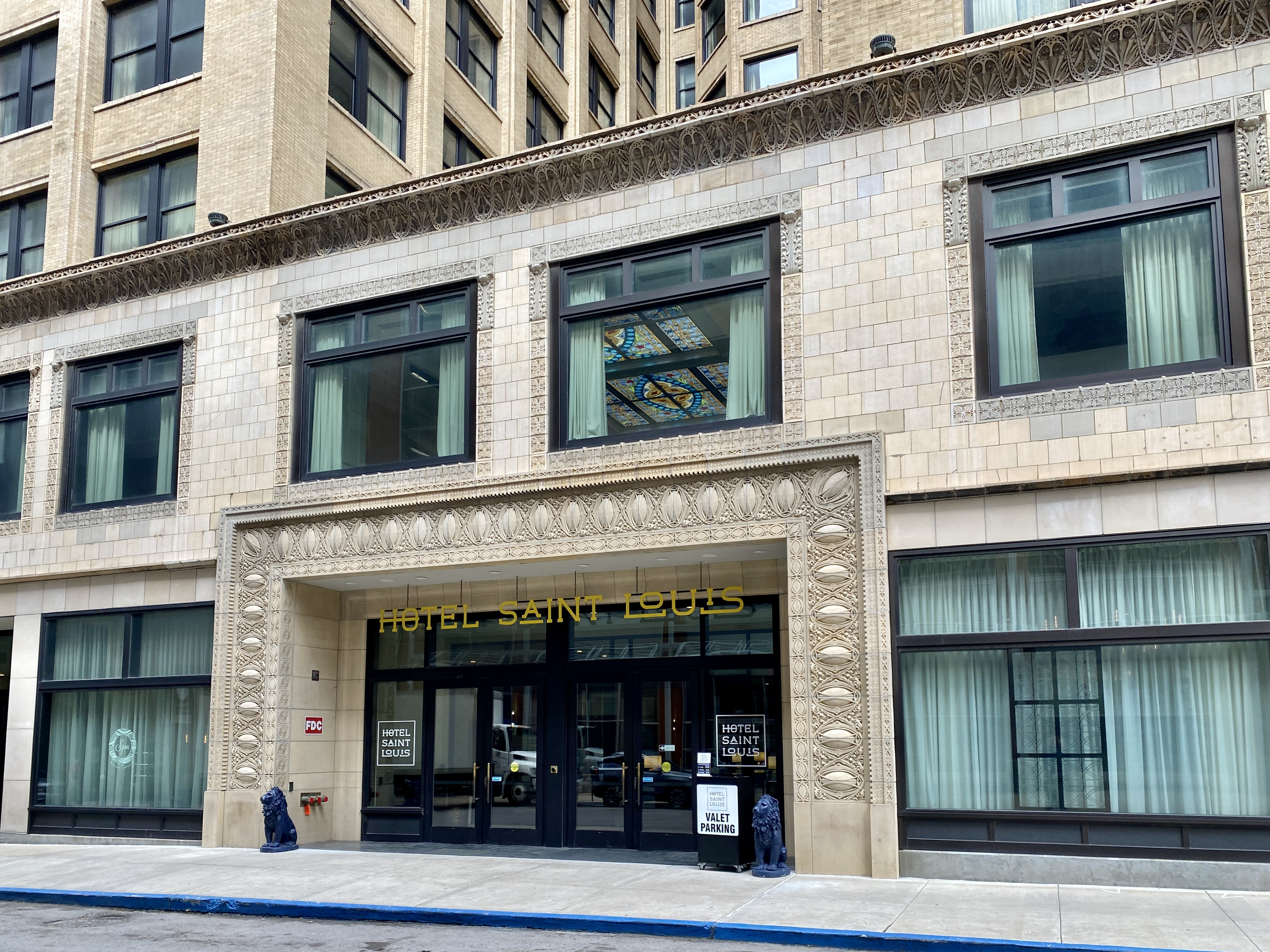
New entranceway, 2023

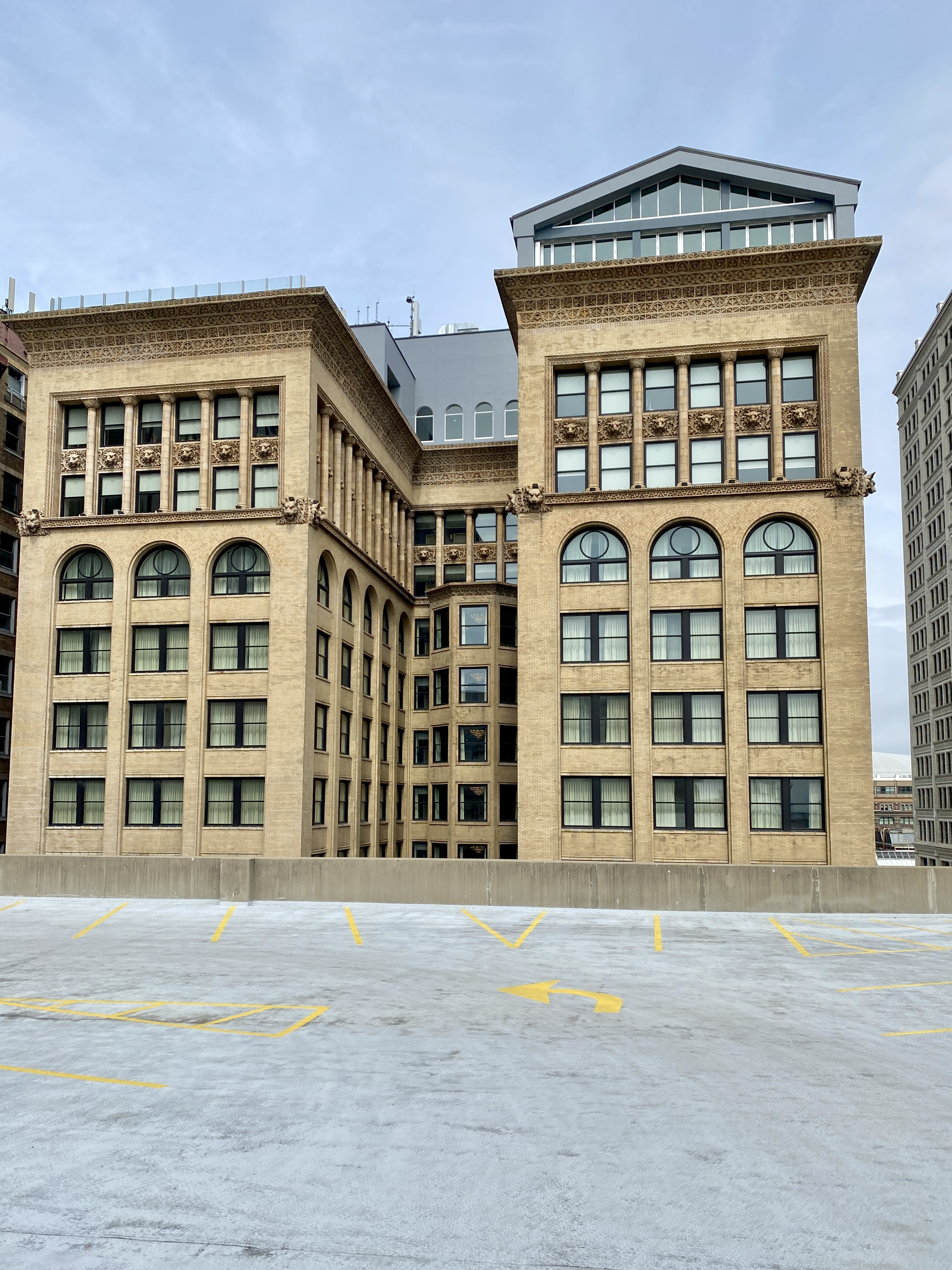
View of upper floors

== See also ==
- National Register of Historic Places listings in Downtown and Downtown West St. Louis
