= Pettit Memorial Chapel =

Historic building in Belvidere, Illinois

- U.S. National Register of Historic Places
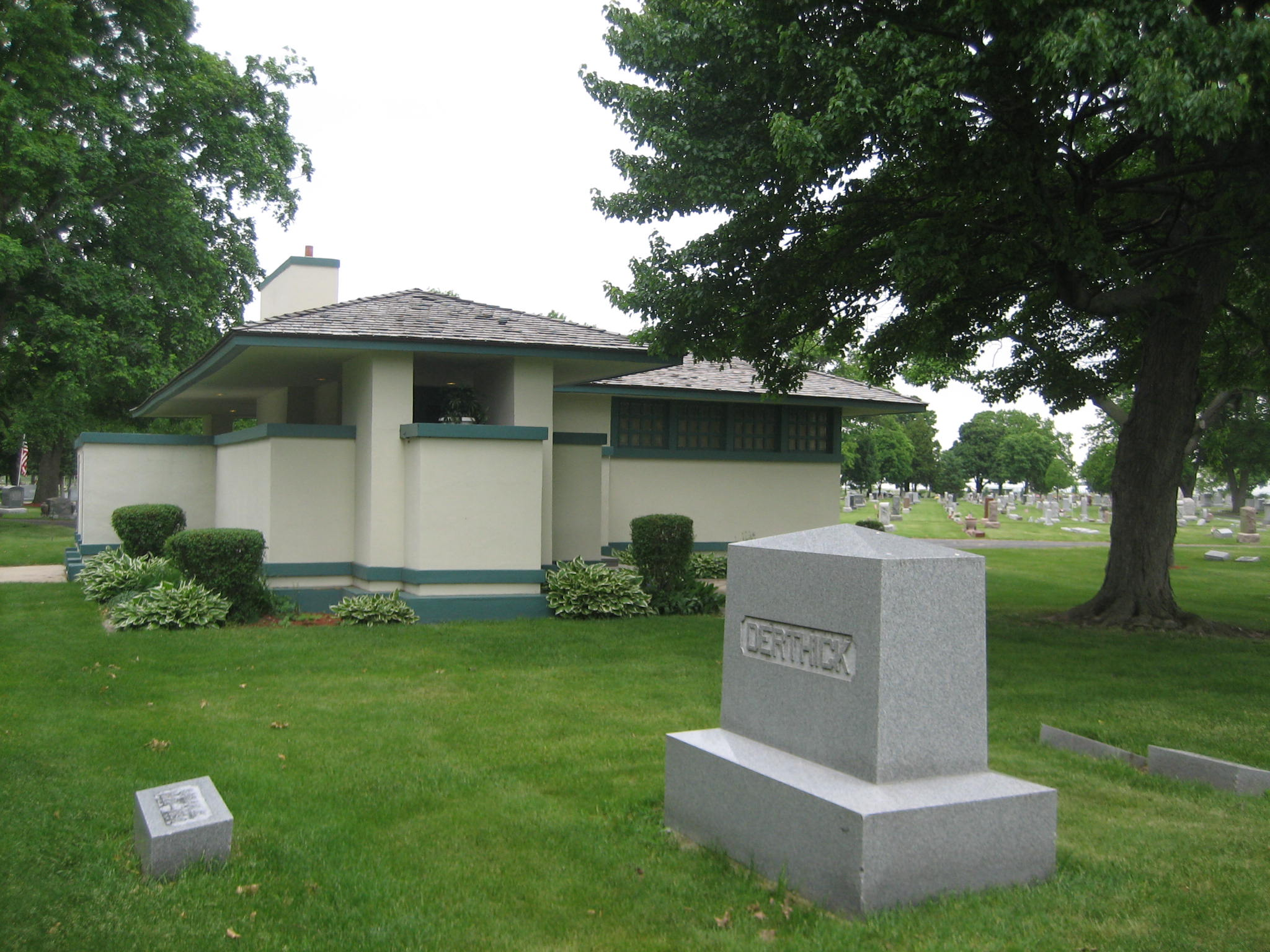

- Location within Illinois Location within the United States
- Location: 1100 N. Main St., Belvidere, Illinois
- Coordinates: 42°16′6.10″N 88°50′59.62″W
- Area: 1 acre (0.40 ha)
- Built: 1907
- Architect: Frank Lloyd Wright
- Architectural style: Prairie style
- Visitation: 50–100 (2003)
- NRHP reference No.: 78001112
- Added to NRHP: December 1, 1978

Pettit Memorial Chapel or Pettit Chapel was designed by architect Frank Lloyd Wright and constructed in 1907. The Pettit Chapel is located in the Belvidere Cemetery in Belvidere, Illinois, United States, and is listed on the National Register of Historic Places. The Pettit Chapel is an example of Frank Lloyd Wright's famed Prairie Style. It is the only funerary structure designed by Wright to be built in his lifetime.

== History ==
The Pettit Memorial Chapel is named in honor of Dr. William Henry Pettit (1850–1899) and was donated to the Belvidere Cemetery Association by his widow Emma Glasner Pettit (1855–1924) who commissioned Frank Lloyd Wright to design the structure in 1906, seven years after the death of her husband. The building was constructed in 1907 at a cost of approximately US$3,000 and stands near the graves of Dr. and Mrs. Pettit. W. H. Pettit received his medical degree from the Hahnemann Medical College in Chicago in 1874 and established a medical practice as a homeopathic physician in Cedar Falls, Iowa. Having himself been raised in Belvidere, Dr. Pettit married Belvidere native Emma Glasner in 1877. Following his sudden death in March 1899, his remains were returned to Belvidere for internment. His widow, Emma Pettit, soon returned to Belvidere to live with her mother. In 1906, the cemetery association set aside land for a future funeral chapel. Emma Pettit decided that this would be a suitable memorial to her deceased husband and donated the structure to the cemetery. Construction was begun in spring 1907 and completed later the same year. Emma Pettit was led to Frank Lloyd Wright by her brother, William A. Glasner, whose 1905 home in Glencoe, Illinois, was designed by Wright.

Pettit Chapel has undergone two periods of restoration during its history. Beginning in 1977, the Belvidere Junior Women's Club raised $60,000 to save the chapel, which had deteriorated. Restoration work was completed in 1981 and the chapel was rededicated June 8, 1981 (Wright's birthday). From June until November 2003 the chapel underwent a second period of restoration and repair. The $40,000 worth of repairs included a new roof, new floorboards for the porch, new steps and painting. The repairs were paid for through a state of Illinois tourism grant and money from a trust fund set up through the cemetery.

== Architecture ==
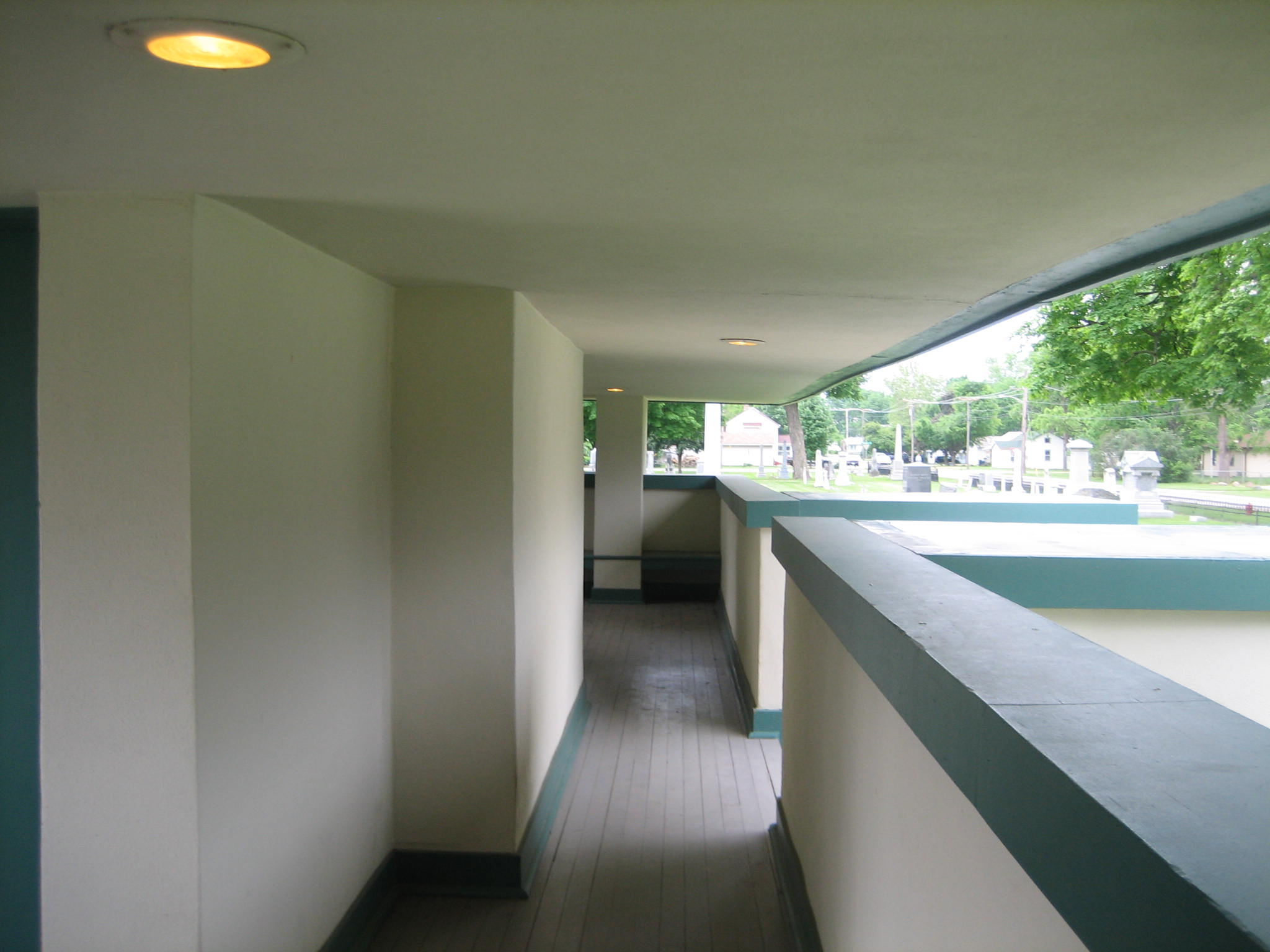
A large porch occupies the cross of the Pettit Chapel's T-shaped plan.

Preliminary design drawings by Wright show that the front or northeast side of the chapel was to be decorated with a modest fountain and pool, which, together with a bas relief plaque identify the structure as a memorial to Dr. Pettit. The building has a T-shaped plan which is about 57 ft (17.37 m) by 42 ft (12.8 m), with the meeting room forms the stem of the T and the two open porches form the cross bar. The building sits well within the cemetery grounds and is accessible in a car only by cemetery roadways. Its cemetery location is unique among Frank Lloyd Wright buildings as this is the only example of its type to be constructed within Wright's lifetime.

The interior is adorned with a fireplace at the T's crossing point. The cross of the T is an open-air, covered porch. The porch not only incorporates the open terrace common to other Wright designed buildings of the era but also has an explicit functionality. Wright meant for the porch to be used by those attending funerals while they waited for cars. The placement of the columns on the porch, pulled back from the open corners is found on other Wright buildings such as the Coonley House and the Martin House. The column placement and Wright's drawings may have influenced European architects after 1910 such as Le Corbusier. The wood framed building's partial basement contains restrooms, storage, and a furnace room, although the building was originally unheated.

The low-pitched hipped roof presents the skyline as quiet and unbroken, a feature typical of some of Wright's important early Prairie buildings such as the Heurtley House, and the Winslow House. It embodies the very essence of Frank Lloyd Wright's Prairie style buildings: the roof and its overhanging eaves, the abstract geometric art glass windows, the raised functional floor and the "plastic expression" of the stucco exterior and its contrasting wood trim.

== Significance ==
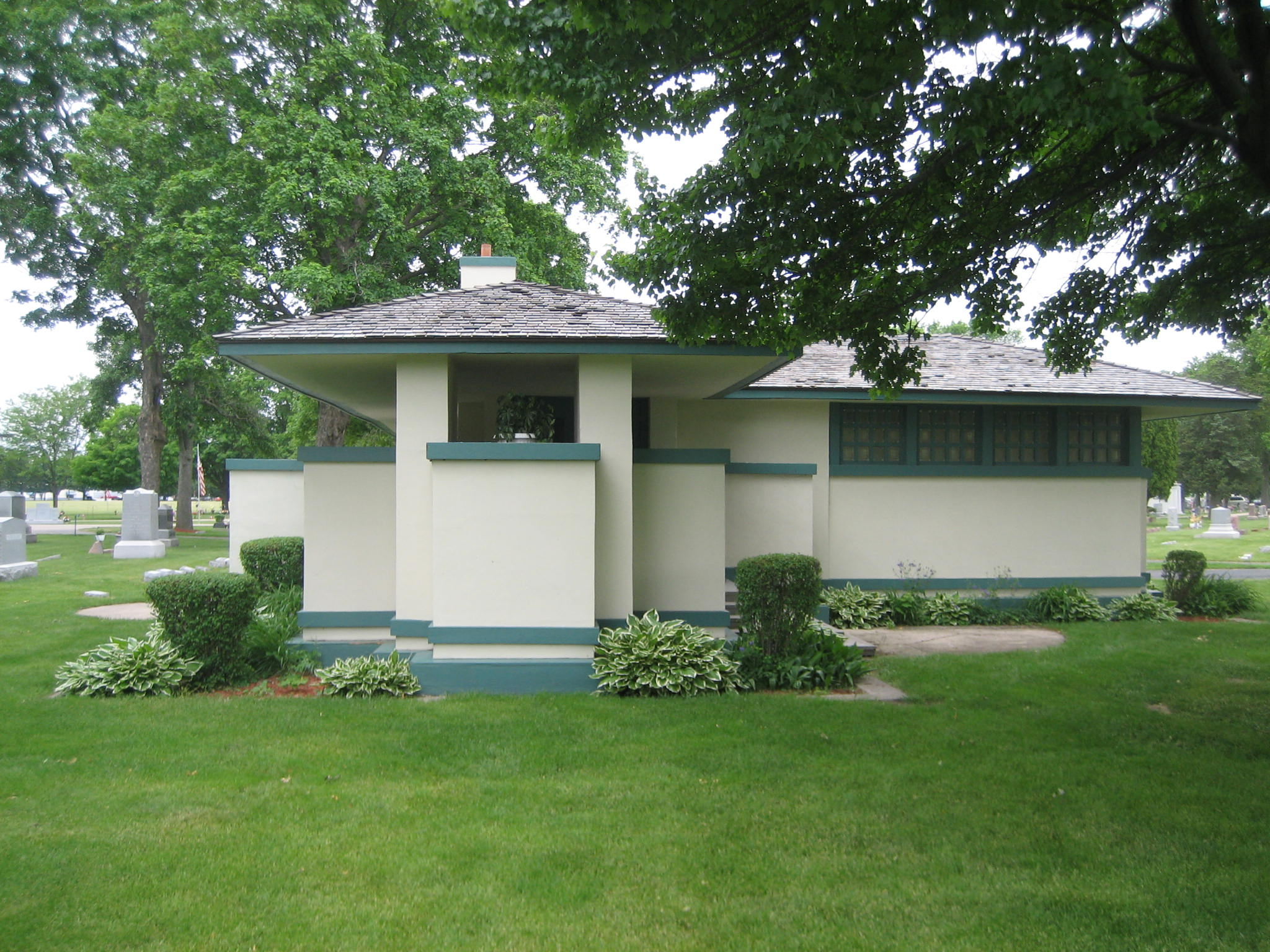
Pettit Memorial Chapel

The Pettit Memorial Chapel was added to the U.S. National Register of Historic Places on December 1, 1978, Although the National Register nomination discusses Wright's work in relation to several significant monuments designed by Louis H. Sullivan, the Pettit Chapel is not a tomb or mausoleum but a functional building. As such, it is not especially useful to compare Wright's chapel to Sullivan's Getty, Ryerson, or Wainwright tombs. It is more productive to view the Pettit Chapel and its architectural significance in the context of Wright's Prairie-style residential work of the period. The residential character of the chapel is consistent with its intended use as a place for funeral services and gatherings as well as a shelter for visitors to the cemetery. The chapel was used for funerals until the 1920s when the use of commercial funeral parlors became more popular.

== See also ==
- List of Frank Lloyd Wright works
- National Register of Historic Places listings in Boone County, Illinois
