= Wainwright Building =

Building in St. Louis, Missouri

- U.S. National Register of Historic Places
- U.S. National Historic Landmark
- St. Louis Landmark
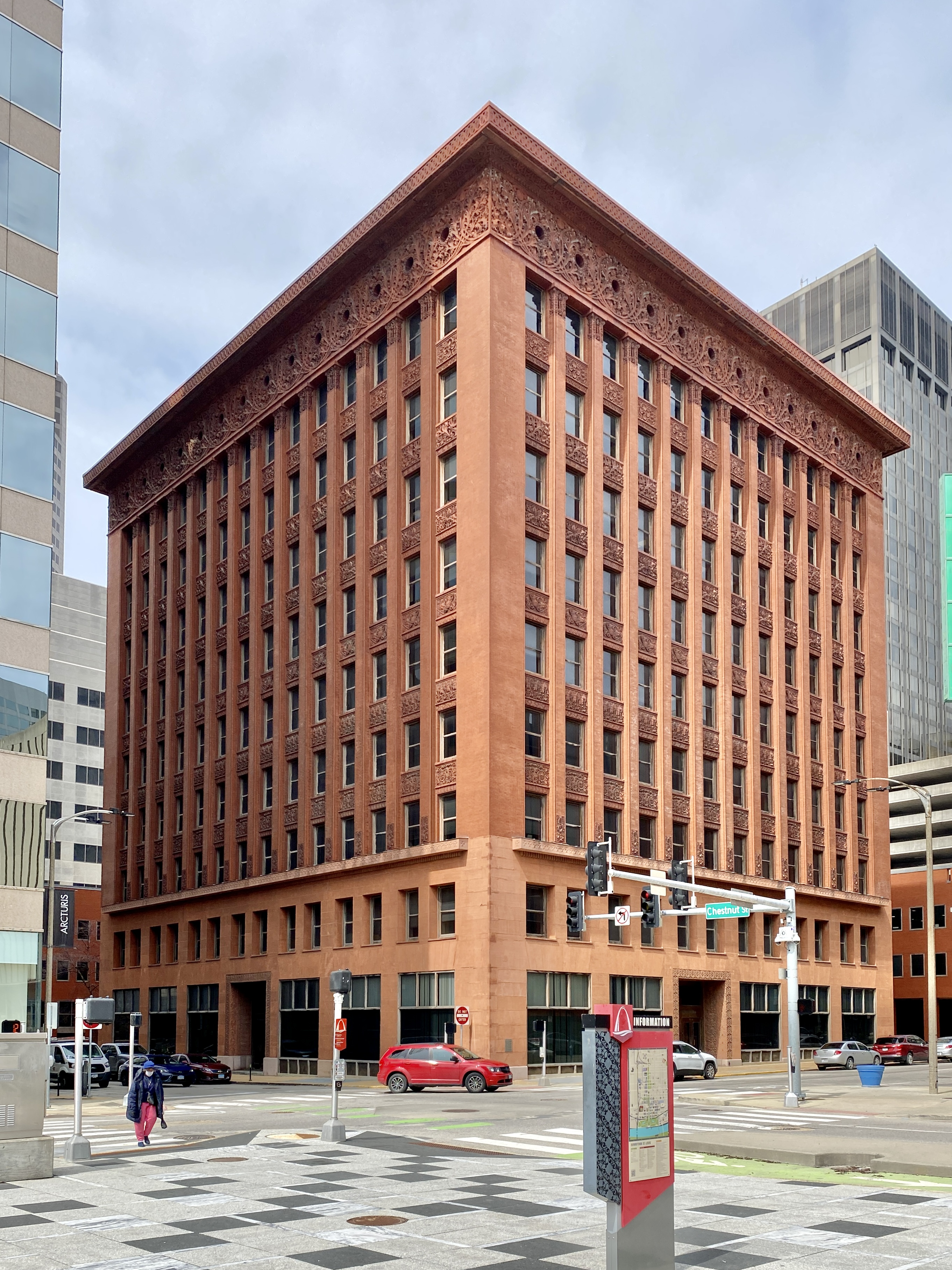

- Location within St. Louis Location within Missouri Location within the United States
- Interactive map of Wainwright Building
- Location: Chestnut Street and Seventh Street; St. Louis, Missouri, US
- Coordinates: 38°37′37″N 90°11′32″W
- Built: 1890–1892
- Architects: Adler & Sullivan (Louis Sullivan and Dankmar Adler)
- Architectural style: Chicago school
- NRHP reference No.: 68000054
- STLL No.: 7

Significant dates
- Added to NRHP: May 23, 1968
- Designated NHL: May 23, 1968
- Designated STLL: 1972

The Wainwright Building (formerly also the Missouri Insurance Building and Wainwright State Office Building) is an office building at Chestnut and Seventh streets in Downtown St. Louis, Missouri, United States. It was designed by Adler & Sullivan, the architectural partnership of Dankmar Adler and Louis Sullivan, and built between 1890 and 1892. It was named for brewer Ellis Wainwright, who commissioned the building. The Wainwright Building was one of the first early skyscrapers with a facade that indicated its structural function. The building is a St. Louis Landmark and a National Historic Landmark.

Wainwright and his mother bought the site in May 1890 and hired Adler & Sullivan later that year. The building, St. Louis's largest office building at the time of its completion in early 1892, was modified in the 1890s and the 1940s. The Missouri Insurance Company bought the Wainwright Building in 1945 and resold it two years later. The building was resold yet again in 1954. Its owner, Sam Michelson Realty Co., announced plans in 1973 to demolish the building because of its unprofitability, prompting efforts to save the building. The Missouri government acquired the full block in 1974 and spent several years renovating the building and redeveloping adjacent sites. After the project was completed in 1981, the Missouri government occupied the building until 2024, when Arch to Park Equity Fund bought it for redevelopment.

The structure is ten stories or 135 feet (41 m) high, with a steel frame and a facade of brick and terracotta. The exterior is divided into three sections—a base, shaft, and capital—after the composition of a classical column. It originally had a U-shaped floor plan arranged around a light court, which was replaced with a glass atrium during the 1975–1981 renovation. There are storefronts at the base; vertical piers with recessed spandrels and windows in the shaft; and a frieze and cornice at the capital. The superstructure consists of a riveted steel frame. Inside, the first floor was intended for shops, while the upper stories had offices; the tenth floor had machinery and water tanks. Over the years, the design has been praised for its facade and structural features, though the non-structural elements of the design received mixed commentary. The design also influenced Adler & Sullivan's later work, as well as the configuration and ornamentation of later skyscrapers.

== Site ==
The Wainwright Building is located at the corner of Chestnut Street and Seventh Street (Note: Addresses at 701 Chestnut, 705 Chestnut, and 709 Chestnut Street have been cited.) in the Downtown neighborhood of St. Louis, Missouri, United States. The Wainwright Building sits on a 127.5-by-114-foot (38.9 by 34.7 m) land lot, with the longer frontage on Chestnut Street to the south. The lot occupies a city block bounded clockwise from east by Seventh, Chestnut, Eighth, and Pine streets. (Note: Multiple sources: For the building being located on the block, see: For the positioning of the streets, see:) The Wainwright Building occupies one-quarter of its block; the rest of the block was replaced with an office annex in the 1970s. The annex, designed by Hastings & Chivetta and Mitchell-Giurgola, consists of three structures surrounding interior courtyards or plazas; they are deliberately built shorter than the original building. The annex has a red facade, complementing the Wainwright Building's red exterior. It is set back from the original building, connected to it by breezeways. The plazas have granite pavers and walls.

The Title Guaranty (also known as Lincoln Trust), Buder, and International buildings formerly sat across the street from the Wainwright Building. These sites were cleared to make way for the Gateway Mall in 1983. When the nearby Title Guaranty Building was demolished, Carolyn Toft, executive director of the St. Louis Landmarks Association, stated that this building "... formed an ensemble with three other late-19th century commercial buildings, including [the Wainwright Building], that could not be equaled anywhere else in the country". The site is also near the 8th & Pine station of the MetroLink light rail system.

In 1836, several decades before the building was developed, a black man accused of murder was beaten and burned to death at the site. The parcel was then owned by Chicago resident Henry Carworth, who sold it in 1885 to Jay Gould, who had planned to erect an office building there. For several years, it contained advertising billboards. Gould sold the building to Dan Catlin in 1889, after failing to develop the site. Just before the Wainwright Building was constructed, the corner itself had a series of two-story brick buildings. The lot was surrounded on two sides by an alley. The existence of the alley allowed the Wainwright Building to be built as a freestanding structure.

== History ==
The building is named for Ellis Wainwright, a local brewer. Wainwright took over his father's brewery by 1874, growing his business substantially. The St. Louis Brewing Association, formed in 1889, took over Wainwright's business. Wainwright admired the work of Louis Sullivan, a Chicago architect who frequently made business trips to St. Louis. Sullivan's firm Adler & Sullivan had been widely acclaimed for their Auditorium Building, completed in Chicago the previous year.

=== Development ===
The lot at Chestnut and Seventh streets was acquired in May 1890 by Wainwright and his mother Catherine, who paid $127,000. (Note: Equivalent to $4.1 million in 2025) The family announced a plan to build a multi-story structure there. Sullivan biographer Willard Connely said that Wainwright enthusiastically asked Sullivan to design a 10-story building, while the St. Louis Post-Dispatch said that Catherine had devised this plan and that Ellis himself was initially skeptical. In any case, Adler & Sullivan received the contract for a 9-story building, budgeted at $500,000. (Note: Equivalent to $16.3 million in 2025) (Note: Other figures of $400,000 (equivalent to $13.1 million in 2025) or $600,000 (equivalent to $19.6 million in 2025) have been cited for the building's budget.) The Wainwright Building was variously cited as the first or second major commission for a tall building won by Adler & Sullivan. It also became the firm's first major project after the Auditorium Building was completed. Local architect Charles K. Ramsey, who is sometimes cited as the original architect, supervised Adler & Sullivan's work. Ramsey, who also supervised all of Adler & Sullivan's later work in St. Louis, may have been the person who introduced Wainwright to the firm.

Dankmar Adler of Adler & Sullivan said it had taken eight months' worth of man-hours to draw up the plans. Wainwright originally wanted a building with a pool hall, billiard rooms, salons, and offices. By September 1890, Adler & Sullivan had drawn up plans for a U-shaped building facing the northern boundary, and the completed plans had been sent to Wainwright for approval. Site excavations began in November 1890; at that point, the Wainwrights had received a permit only for excavation. The Gerhart Company, the Wainwright family's real estate agent, had already leased ground-level stores to real estate firms, and it was renting the upper-story offices out. Sullivan began drawing up details of the ornamentation in early 1891, and the city authorized the Wainwright Building Company to construct its basement under the neighboring alleys that March. The next month, workers began erecting the masonry, at which point the building was planned to rise 10 stories.

Part of the building's steel frame had been built by that July, when it was disassembled and rebuilt because workers had forgotten to put iron plates beneath each pillar. Steelworkers went on strike in October to protest unpaid wages, at which point more than 20 real estate firms had agreed to take space at the building. By December 1891, work had reached the sixth floor, and the offices were scheduled to open the following August. Rental brochures issued during late 1891 advertised the offices as being available "on or about June 1, 1892". Scaffolding was placed on the building to protect it from winter weather. Part of the floor slab collapsed in February 1892 while workers were completing the interior, injuring a worker, and the scaffolding fell down in a windstorm the next month. The building was substantially complete by early 1892, and it was rapidly being rented out by that June. The total cost came out at $550,000 to $600,000, (Note: Equivalent to $17.6–19.2 million in 2025) or $0.25–$0.35 per cubic foot ($8.8–$12.4/m^{3}).

=== Original offices ===
The Wainwright Building originally had 225 offices, making it St. Louis's largest office building at the time of its completion. F. H. and C. B. Gerhart of the Gerhart Company were hired as the leasing agents. The building counted among its earliest tenants the Missouri–Kansas–Texas Railroad, which leased an entire floor. Other early tenants included Prudential Financial, the St. Louis Brewing Association, doctors, lawyers, architects, and a newspaper company. Ellis owned a two-thirds stake in the building, while his mother and sister owned the other third.

==== 1890s to 1920s ====
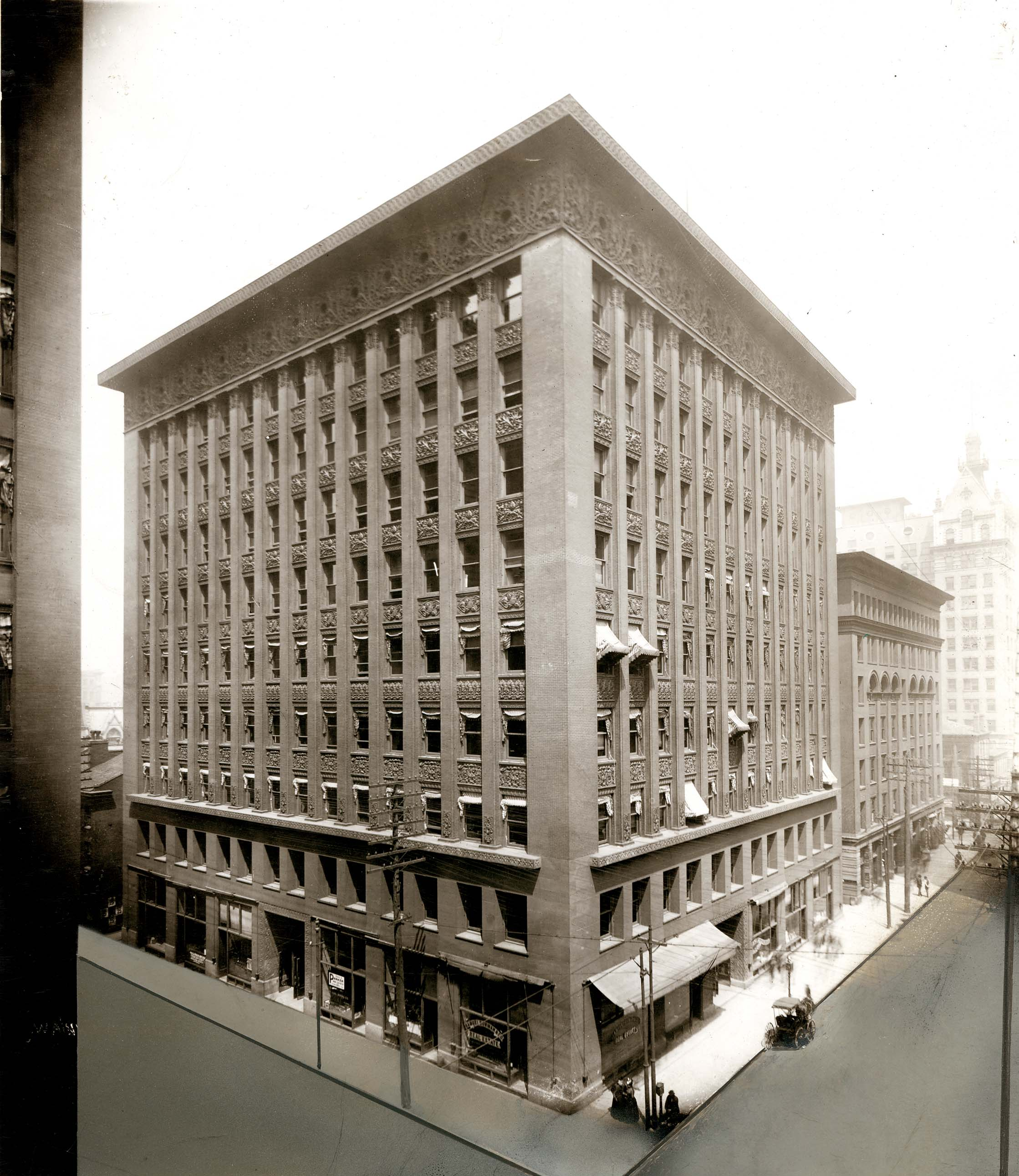
The building in 1907

Following the Wainwright Building's construction, theaters, department stores, and additional office buildings were built on Seventh Street. The Gerhart Company offered to provide steam heat from the basement power plant to neighboring property owners. In 1895, the Gerhart Company hired Ramsey to construct a one-story restaurant within the light court at the site's northern end; this restaurant was leased to the Sprague Delicatessen Company as a cafe. Frank Gerhart, one of the renting agents, said that year that only nine of the offices were vacant. The top floor was modified in 1896 with the addition of a barbershop and marble restrooms, and the next year, the building narrowly survived a fire that damaged the woodwork and 200 of the windows. Ellis Wainwright was earning $60,000 a year from rental income by the 1900s. (Note: Equivalent to $1.7 million in 2025)

The Gerharts arranged to sell Wainwright's share of the building to a group of local investors in February 1905. The group, led by William Pickel, agreed to pay $900,000 (Note: Equivalent to $25.0 million in 2025) on behalf of the German-American Bank, which was seeking a new building in St. Louis. At the time, properties on Chestnut Street were in high demand, and Wainwright, who had moved to Paris, was selling off his holdings in St. Louis. Pickel paid $5 before reneging, on the basis that the Gerharts lacked authority to sell the building, prompting a lawsuit from the Wainwright Real Estate Company in May 1905. A judge ruled in 1908 that Pickel was not required to buy the building, and so the sale was never finalized. Despite living in Paris, Wainwright continued to own a majority stake in the building, which was his only major property holding in St. Louis by 1909.

In 1911, the St. Louis Real Estate Exchange proposed erecting a new structure at 713 Chestnut Street and connecting it to the Wainwright Building via an arcade above the neighboring alley. The exchange moved into the Wainwright Building's first floor that December, taking over the former restaurant and adjacent space. By that decade, Frank Frick of the Gerhart Company was managing the building, and the northwest corner of the ground floor (adjoining the Real Estate Exchange) was occupied by a real estate firm. Ellis Wainwright died in 1924, and his will specified that Washington University inherit his 54% ownership stake. Wainwright's will was challenged in a lawsuit by a 23-year-old woman he adopted; the lawsuit was ultimately settled out of court with a monetary settlement.

==== 1930s to early 1970s ====
A refrigeration substation was installed in the building in 1937, taking up the entire basement. The building underwent renovations starting in December 1940 and continuing through the next year. Aluminum entryways and acoustic tile ceilings were added, and building manager Arthur Schneider upgraded the plumbing, directory board, and mail chute and installed three electric elevators. These renovations cost over $100,000. (Note: Equivalent to $1.7 million in 2025) Washington University sold its ownership shares in 1944 to a group of real-estate investors headed by Saul A. Dubinsky. By then, real-estate firms made up many of the building's tenants. The Missouri Insurance Company bought the Wainwright Building in 1945 with plans to remodel the ninth floor; it also took additional space on other floors. At the time, the property was valued at $275,000. (Note: Equivalent to $3.9 million in 2025) The building thereafter became known as the Missouri Insurance Building, and its former agent, the Gerhart Company, moved out. Missouri Insurance renovated the Chestnut Street lobby and elevators, and it began renovating the Seventh Street lobby.

Missouri Insurance resold the building in 1947 to the Seventh and Chestnut Building Corporation, a syndicate of investors from the eastern US, which assumed a $475,000 lien on the property. (Note: Equivalent to $5.4 million in 2025) Under the terms of the sale, Missouri Insurance continued to lease space in the building and specified that the building retain Missouri Insurance's name; in addition, the new owners were obligated to complete the Seventh Street lobby's renovation. At the time, the building was fully occupied. The St. Louis Real Estate Board remained a major tenant until it moved out in 1950. In 1954, a series of St. Louis investors led by Sam Michelson and D. Samuel Wise bought all ownership shares in the Seventh and Chestnut Building Company, the Wainwright Building's legal owner. The new owners planned to renovate the former cafe, upgrade bathrooms, rearrange the offices, and replace existing wiring to handle increased electrical needs. At the time, Missouri Insurance still occupied the eighth through tenth floors.

The building was again known as the Wainwright Building by the early 1960s, when it attracted visiting architects. By that decade, its major tenants included the National Credit Bureau. Downtown St. Louis was being redeveloped around that time, and the Wainwright Building was one of the relative few historically significant structures remaining in the area. The St. Louis American called it one of four "genuine old landmarks" downtown, along with the Campbell House, Old Post Office, and Old Courthouse. Decorations were falling off the building by the late 1960s, and the owners were planning to attract new tenants by replacing the facade, the building's main design feature. Architect John D. Randall of Southern Illinois University Edwardsville wrote an open letter endorsing the building's preservation, to which over a dozen architects agreed. The building's rear walls were damaged during a gas explosion in 1972.

=== 1970s and early 1980s: Redevelopment ===
==== Government purchase ====
Detail of the entrance

In June 1973, Sam Michelson announced that the building would likely be demolished because of its unprofitability, claiming that he had tried unsuccessfully to find a buyer. At the time, the building was dilapidated, and only half the 90,000 square feet (8,400 m^{2}) of space was occupied. The surrounding neighborhood had become blighted. Michelson planned to replace it with a parking lot. Numerous groups, including the government of Missouri, expressed interest in the structure. The National Trust for Historic Preservation took an option on the structure that November, with the aim of securing a buyer. The option initially ran for only two months, but the trust ultimately retained the option for nine months. The cost of the option depleted the trust's endangered buildings fund, though the group was later compensated by the state government. The Landmarks Association of St. Louis and the American Institute of Architects' local chapter estimated that a full renovation would cost $3 million. (Note: Equivalent to $15.2 million in 2025)

Meanwhile, Missouri governor Christopher Bond considered preserving the Wainwright Building as part of a new state office complex. The Missouri government needed additional office space, and Bond had become appreciative of Sullivan's work while attending college. Following advocacy from local groups and preservationists, Bond recommended in February 1974 that the state's Board of Public Buildings buy the structure. The board approved the purchase shortly afterward. Opponents, including Missouri House of Representatives speaker Richard J. Rabbitt, claimed the Wainwright complex would cost about $22 million. (Note: Equivalent to $111.6 million in 2025) Rabbitt proposed acquiring the Continental Building on Olive Street, but the governor's office rejected that proposal because that structure would be costlier to renovate. In July, the Missouri General Assembly, the legislative branch, approved an $11 million (Note: Equivalent to $55.8 million in 2025) appropriation to restore the building and demolish neighboring sites, and the building received a matching grant for the restoration. The Missouri government finalized its acquisition for $450,000 the next month. (Note: Equivalent to $2.3 million in 2025)

==== Renovation ====
The Missouri government then launched an architectural design competition for the state office complex, receiving 47 entries. Hastings & Chivetta and Mitchell-Giurgola were hired to design the complex in late 1974. This included restoring the Wainwright Building's exterior and constructing 115,000 square feet (10,700 m^{2}) of new space; one of the floors was also to be restored to its original layout. The state paid $1.95 million (Note: Equivalent to $9.0 million in 2025) for the rest of the block in February 1975, by which point the renovation architects were drawing up renovation plans. That year, following disputes between Bond and Rabbitt, the General Assembly redirected $4.9 million of the project's funding for a new midtown office building in St. Louis. (Note: Equivalent to $22.7 million in 2025) Despite advocacy from preservationists, the state declined to buy neighboring properties from the same era. Contractors cleared the rest of the block and demolished the interior partitions in preparation for the renovation. Some of the building's original stained glass windows were stolen and held for ransom, prompting increased security at the site.

By late 1975, the two main architects were no longer communicating, and Hastings & Chivetta had revised the design without Mitchell-Giurgola's knowledge. When the state government solicited bids for the renovation that September, the lowest bid exceeded the $3.5 million renovation budget. (Note: Equivalent to $16.2 million in 2025) In March 1976, the Board of Public Buildings authorized demolition of the block's other structures. The board also proposed selling bonds to raise extra funding, and that May, it reached a compromise with the legislature to fund both the Wainwright Building and the new midtown structure. The state had planned to sell $5.4 million (Note: Equivalent to $23.7 million in 2025) in bonds for the building's renovation and expansion that August, but the sale was deferred because of concerns about the funds' marketability. The federal government had allocated $3 million to help fund the renovation, (Note: Equivalent to $13.2 million in 2025) but due to an administrative error, the General Assembly did not approve these funds during its 1976 legislative session. Meanwhile, the state ran out of money after spending $2.8 million, (Note: Equivalent to $12.3 million in 2025) and renovation work was temporarily halted by late 1976 while funding disputes continued.

In April 1977, the Missouri House of Representatives recommended reallocating funds from the midtown project to the Wainwright Building. The General Assembly approved $14.2 million for the renovation that September, (Note: Equivalent to $58.8 million in 2025) accounting for about two-thirds of the project's cost; the rest was to be funded federally. Rallo Construction submitted an $11.2 million low bid for the renovation in April 1978, (Note: Equivalent to $43.3 million in 2025) and the General Assembly authorized a bond sale that month. The Board of Public Buildings sold $13.5 million in bonds for the Wainwright Building and annex that June. (Note: Equivalent to $52.2 million in 2025) The renovation included cleaning the exterior and creating an interior atrium. For his role in preserving the building, Bond received a preservation award from the National Trust for Historic Preservation in 1979. The following year, the state provided another $1.5 million for furnishings. (Note: Equivalent to $4.9 million in 2025) The renovation and annex were completed in March 1981 and were officially rededicated by Bond that June. The project had cost $14 million. (Note: Equivalent to $41.9 million in 2025)

=== State office building ===
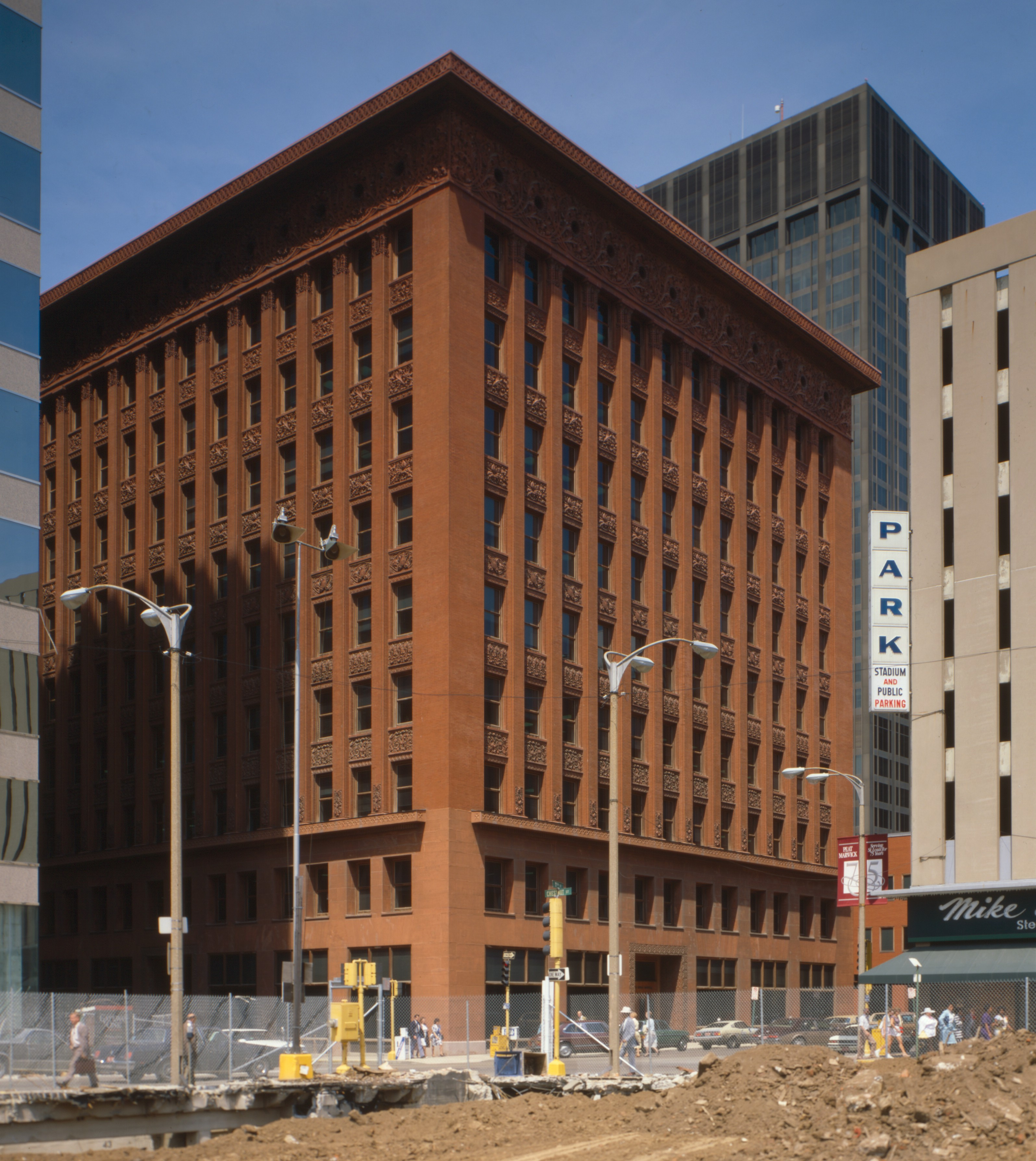
Seen in 1986

Following the renovation, the structure accommodated 18 state governmental departments with a combined 700 employees. The original structure housed departments such as the Missouri Arts Council and the attorney general's and gubernatorial offices, while the annex housed offices such as the Missouri Court of Appeals. The renovation's completion coincided with proposals to demolish neighboring buildings to make way for the Gateway Mall park, opening up views of the Wainwright Building. The proposal garnered opposition—including from Romaldo Giurgola, who had helped renovate the building—though the sites were ultimately cleared anyway.

By mid-1982, within a year of the building's reopening, six of the ninety panels in the new interior atrium had shattered, prompting the Missouri government to replace the atrium's glass. Missouri Auditor James Antonio also determined that the state was overcharging state agencies rent at the building. The state's consumer services office moved out of the building in 1986. Upon the Wainwright Building's centennial, the Post-Dispatch wrote that the building was kept extremely clean and quiet, despite the large number of state government departments housed there. By then, the surrounding blocks were filled with parking garages.

The Missouri Gaming Commission moved into the building when it was established in 1993. There was a shortage of parking space for the building's employees by the late 1990s, since a parking garage planned as part of the Gateway Mall had never been built. A parking garage was eventually built a block away in 2002. The state continued to occupy the Wainwright Building into the 2020s, almost half a century after the 1970s renovation. The Missouri Department of Revenue, which occupied some offices at the Wainwright Building, requested the state government's permission in 2019 to relocate some of its employees elsewhere due to fears of crime downtown; Governor Mike Parson rejected the request, citing the state's fiscal shortfalls.

=== Sale and further redevelopment ===
In 2024, the Missouri government announced plans to move all 400 of the Wainwright Building's employees to the suburb of Chesterfield, Missouri. The move was motivated both by a need to consolidate employees from two locations and fears over crime in St. Louis. The building was placed for sale that July and was sold at auction that September for approximately $8 million. The buyer, Arch to Park Equity Fund, was affiliated with Greater St. Louis Inc., an urban development fund. The St. Louis city government agreed to provide full-time security to the building while the state government moved out. The Missouri government began relocating employees in May 2025, and Arch to Park Equity Fund issued a request for proposal for the Wainwright Building's redevelopment. One proposal called for donating the building to the government of St. Louis County, provided that the separate city and county of St. Louis were to merge.

== Architecture ==
The Wainwright Building was designed by Adler & Sullivan as an early Chicago school-style work. The building's design demonstrates the "form follows function" philosophy advanced by Louis Sullivan, a partner in Adler & Sullivan, and many of the design philosophies incorporated into the design were summarized in Sullivan's 1896 essay "The Tall Office Building Artistically Considered". In that essay, Sullivan wrote that a skyscraper "must be tall, every inch of it tall. The force and power of altitude must be in it the glory and pride of exaltation must be in it." By contrast, Sullivan's partner Dankmar Adler believed that "the purpose of erecting buildings other than those required for the shelter of their owners is specifically that of making investments for profit." Historian Hugh Morrison wrote that the Wainwright design, and others where Sullivan was the primary architect, disproved a wide-ranging misconception that Sullivan was "more of an decorator than an architect". Kristian Schneider, a craftsman who frequently collaborated with Sullivan, worked on architectural decorations.

The building's design was modern for its time, forgoing the neoclassical style that Sullivan derided; economist Edward Glaeser wrote that the Wainwright Building was the first skyscraper to exclude neoclassical ornamentation. Instead, Sullivan used organic decorations to contrast with the structural forms and to make them more prominent. Sullivan retrospectively told fellow architect Claude Fayette Bragdon that the Wainwright Building's design had come to him spontaneously, claiming to have drawn up the plans in three minutes after a "volcanic" spurt of inspiration. However, historian Narciso Menocal said that Sullivan may have been inspired by Reims Cathedral and Notre-Dame de Paris. Some architectural elements from the building have been removed and are stored by the National Building Arts Center in Sauget, Illinois.

=== Form ===
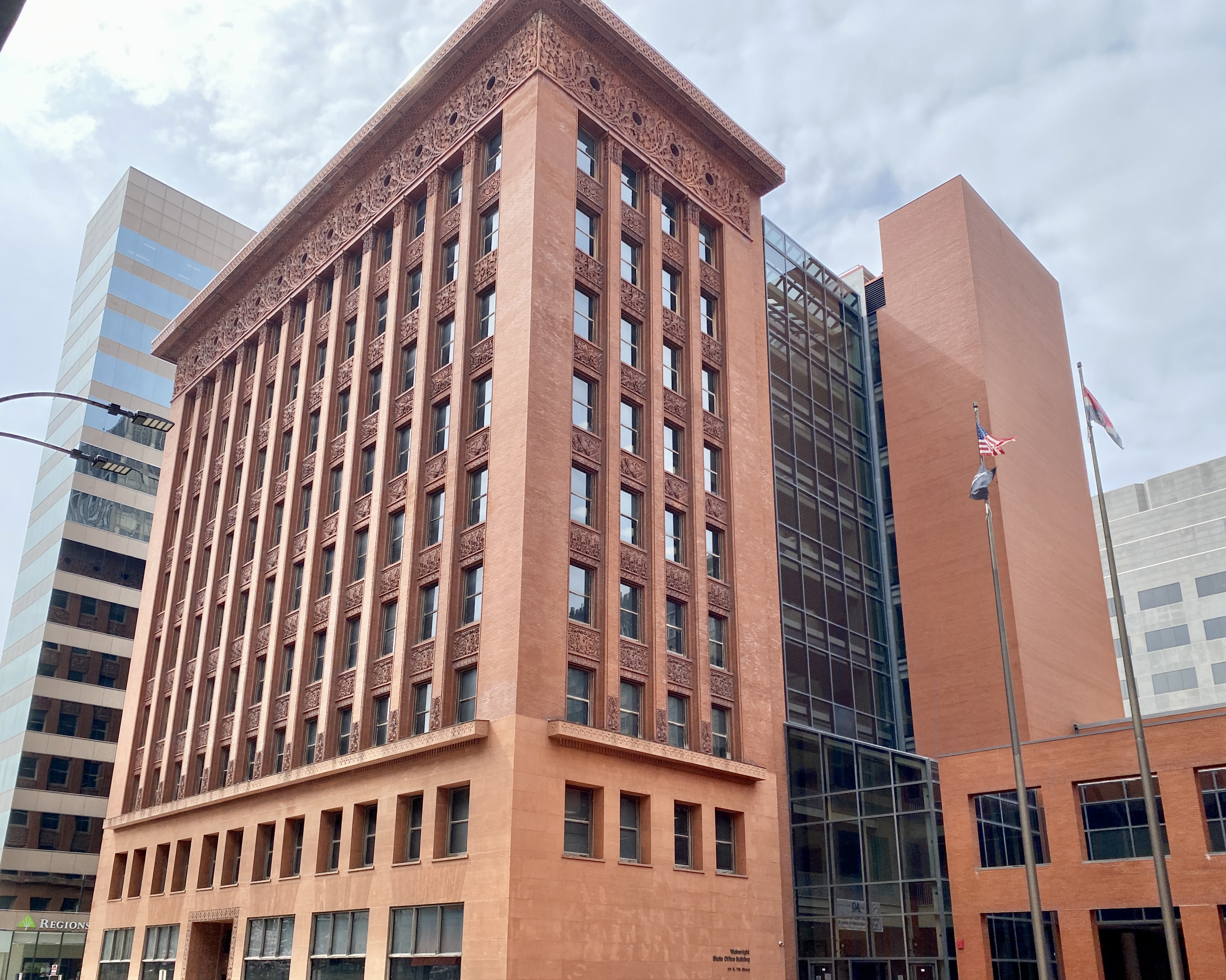
North end of the building, showing the glass atrium within the former light court

The building rises 135 feet (41 m) above ground. (Note: Siry 1996, p. 14, gives a different height of 132 feet (40 m).) Its form, or configuration, is based around what historian Joseph Siry described as "unit lengths" and "unit widths". In the north–south direction, the building is divided into 13 unit lengths of 8 feet 6.5 inches (2.604 m) each, and in the west–east direction, the building is divided into 15 unit widths of 8 feet 3.5 inches (2.527 m) each. Though the building gives the appearance of a square massing, it has a U-shaped floor plan originally arranged around a light court on its north side, a variation of the "Chicago Quarter Block" office building layout popular across the US. The western frontage is also set back 9 feet (2.7 m) from the lot line, except for a small wing protruding along the southernmost 49 feet (15 m) of the western frontage.

The wings flanking each light court measure 5 1/2 unit widths across. The light court itself spanned four unit widths and was variously cited as measuring 32 by 65 feet (9.8 by 19.8 m) or 30 by 60 feet (9.1 by 18.3 m) across, with the longer dimension stretching into the "U". It accounted for 20% of the lot area and provided additional natural light to the interior offices while mostly remaining hidden from the street. During its 1975–1981 renovation, the light court was converted into an atrium with a glass wall and roof.

=== Facade ===
The facade has a tripartite horizontal division—a two-story base, seven-story shaft, and one-story capital—after the composition of a classical column. The tripartite design, a continuation of a similar design concept Sullivan used for the Carrie Eliza Getty Tomb in Chicago's Graceland Cemetery, was intended to indicate the differing functions of each section. It contrasted with high-rise designs such as the Reliance Building or the Tacoma Building, which focused on what writer Richard Etlin called "rational industrial production". It also contrasted with the firm's earlier Auditorium Building, which used a tripartite facade with neoclassical inspiration, and which one historian called "three different buildings on top of each other".

The two primary elevations of the facade face south and east toward the neighboring streets. The building has decorations of terracotta, a building material that was gaining popularity at the time of construction. About 1.125 million bricks were used in the building's construction as well. The exterior decorations were intended to indicate the superstructure inside, and they also unified each elevation of the facade into a grid. They also signified a "structural ornament", a characteristic of early Chicago school designs, in which openings and decorations were added to a design after the massing had been devised.

==== Base ====
The lowest 2 feet (0.61 m) of the building's facade is clad in Missouri red granite, above which the first and second stories are clad with brown sandstone ashlar. Originally, the building was supposed to have an archway on Chestnut Street. In keeping with Sullivan's belief that the first story should be treated "in a more or less liberal, expansive, sumptuous way", Sullivan decided against either a grand arch or a nondescript entrance. Instead, he used rectangular frames for all of the ground-floor openings; the main entrance was designed with carved bands around it.

Sullivan had written in his essay that the ground floor should have a "large area, ample spacing, ample light, and great freedom of access". Accordingly, he incorporated large storefront windows into the ground floor. These openings are decorated plainly and each contain one large plate-glass pane at the bottom, topped by three smaller clerestory panes. Each bay of the base corresponds to the width of two bays in the shaft. All windows from the second story upward are double-hung sash windows. Above the second floor is a string course, which wraps horizontally across the facade, except at the corners where they are interrupted by large corner piers. This string course has ornamental terracotta patterns. Additional piers on the first story rise straight through the shaft to the ninth floor.

==== Shaft ====
Detail of the midsection, with windows and spandrels recessed from the piers

Sullivan believed that all the upper stories except for the top floor should appear identical, indicating the intended interior use, in which these stories were devoted to offices. He sought to draw attention to the building's vertical design details, contrasting with contemporary skyscrapers that tended to downplay their height. As such, the third through ninth stories are clad in vertical brick piers, which continue uninterrupted through the shaft. A string course runs across the building above the ninth floor, terminating the piers and wrapping around the corners. The terracotta on the shaft is identical in color to the bricks.

The piers in the center of each elevation (between the windows) have identical appearances and each measure 2.5 feet (0.76 m) wide. The centers of each pier, in turn, are spaced 8 feet (2.4 m) apart. Half of the center piers conceal structural steel columns at the building's perimeter, alternating with piers that serve no structural purpose; the structural piers are continuations of the first-story piers, while the non-structural piers start at the second floor. The edges of each central pier have rolled moldings. The tops of the piers have terracotta ornamentation, in the manner of pilasters with capitals. The corner piers are 7 feet (2.1 m) wide, three times the width of the center piers. The corner piers were meant to conceal misalignments in the unit plan; the columns behind these piers are the same width as the building's other columns.

The building's windows, and the spandrel panels between different floors, are recessed slightly behind the piers. In his 1896 essay, Sullivan compared the windows in "a cell in a honeycomb, nothing more". Each window is about 8 feet (2.4 m) tall, and the windows are much wider than those in comparable buildings with load-bearing walls, due to the use of an interior steel frame. The recessed spandrel panels, in combination, create the appearance of horizontal ribbons interrupted by the piers, which creates a grid and allows the vertical piers to stand out. The spandrel panels are covered in red terracotta ornamentation, which varies on each story. These spandrels were intended to conceal the floor slabs. The spandrels, combined with the piers, created what William Pierson Jr. and William Jordy called a "clearly differentiated component" of the shaft.

==== Capital ====
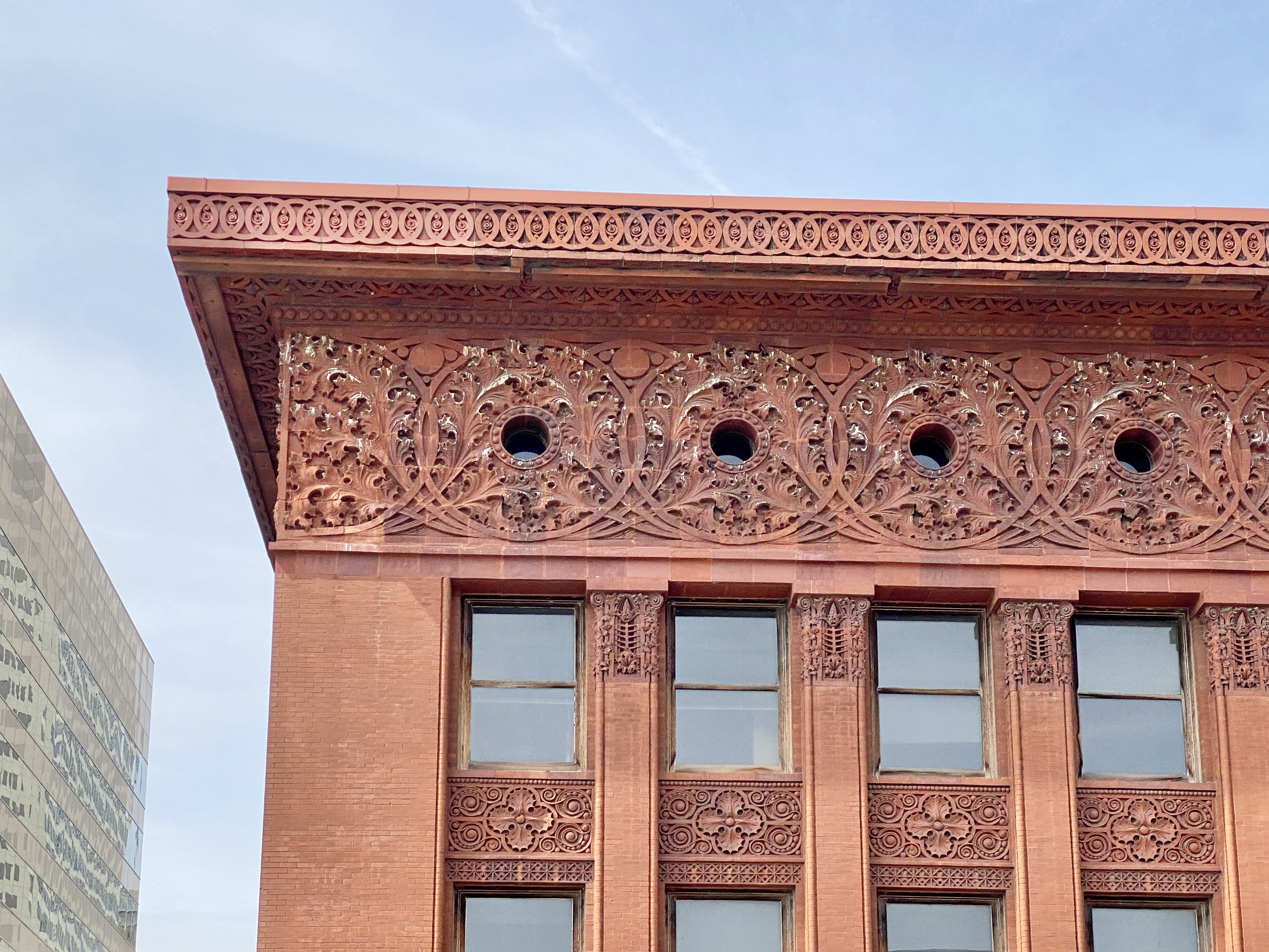
There are bulls-eye windows in the frieze atop the building.

The tenth and highest story is clad with red terracotta, forming a wide frieze. The tenth-story frieze gives the appearance of an attic; as such, the building is sometimes described as having only nine stories. The frieze also stretches across the entire facade, functioning as a "climactic ornament" as Pierson and Jordy described it. The ornamentation, a continuation of the decorations on lower stories, contains the formalized yet naturalistic celery-leaf designs typical of Sullivan and published in his System of Architectural Ornament. Sullivan used a similar esthetic effect in the Dooly Building in Salt Lake City and an early plan for the Auditorium Building, and he had previously used top-heavy ornamentation for the Getty Tomb.

The frieze has small bull's-eye windows that light the top story, in keeping with Sullivan's ideal of a top story or attic receiving little light. The Wainwright Building is topped by a flat roof slab, which protrudes from the wall as a deep cornice. The use of a flat roof above an ornamental attic was similar to the Dooly Building.

=== Structural and mechanical features ===
Structurally, the building sits on a foundation of isolated concrete footings, measuring 16 feet (4.9 m) deep. (Note: Historian Robert Twombly writes that one source cites a figure of 30 feet (9.1 m) for the foundations.) At the northeastern and southwestern corners, the rear walls (along the northern and western elevations, respectively) have continuous load-bearing walls, which are made of solid masonry and extend through the first floor. Although the building exerts a force of 2.5 short tons per square foot (24 t/m^{2}) on the ground below, it experienced minimal settlement when built.

The superstructure consists of a riveted steel frame with columns both at the perimeter and interior. The frame uses cylindrical Phoenix columns with steel strips that resemble staves. They are riveted to girders under the floors, as well as spandrel beams between the columns at the perimeter. Fireproof tiles wrap around interior steel columns, and movable fireproof partitions divided the original offices. The columns themselves are spaced 17 1/12 feet (5.2 m) apart, equivalent to about two unit lengths or widths. The steel frame has diagonal bracing and, within the building's base, beams embedded within squared brownstone blocks.

As built, the basement contained a large bathroom, water pumps, heaters, and electrical equipment; it had also been planned with Turkish baths, but this space was ultimately used as storage. The basement was the only story that filled the entire site, as the rest of the building was U-shaped. By the 1930s, the basement had an air-conditioning substation with pipelines connecting to nearby buildings. There were originally four elevators to access the upper-story offices, placed within openwork elevator cages. These elevators were hydraulic and were replaced with three electric elevators in 1941. The modern building has elevators within the glass atrium.

=== Interior ===
The interior furnishings were typical of late-19th-century American office buildings, except for the hardware, which was custom designed. Corridors were wainscoted with marble and had tiled floors. The arrangement of the levels largely conforms to the optimal office-building layout Sullivan mentioned in his 1896 essay. The essay outlined a building with below-grade mechanical and utility areas; a ground floor with public shops; a second story with publicly accessible offices; an intermediate section with private offices; and a utilitarian attic.

The first floor of the Wainwright Building was intended for shops, of which there were nine. Six shops lined the entrance corridor on Chestnut Street, and the other three were on Seventh Street; the Chestnut shops measured 17 by 34 feet (5.2 by 10.4 m), while the Seventh Street shops measured 16 by 45 feet (4.9 by 13.7 m). There were nine such shops. The northwest section of the building had a large office. A restaurant in the light court dates from an 1890s modification. As built, the restaurant measured 23 1/2 by 47 1/6 feet (7.2 by 14.4 m) across and had tiled floors, soft-green tile wainscoting, mirrored walls, and vaulted ceiling. In general, the first floor had quartered-oak wainscoting.

The second through ninth stories had the same interior layout. Each of these stories had 25 offices, which measured 12 by 22 feet (3.7 by 6.7 m) across. The offices were generally arranged along a central corridor and were separated by movable partitions, which could be attached to the facade's piers. The offices on each floor occupied about 53% of the lot area. The rest of the space was taken up by the corridor, elevators, stairs, utilities, and light court. Most stories had small marble restrooms, and they had red oak wainscoting in the halls and maple wainscoting within the offices.

The tenth and highest floor was for water tanks and building machinery. It also had a large series of bathrooms for the entire building, all of which had marble wainscoting and tiled floors. There was a barbershop on the tenth floor, illuminated by a ceiling skylight.

== Impact and legacy ==
=== Reception ===
The Wainwright Building received favorable acclaim when built.

Historians Joseph Korom and Robert Twombly wrote that the Wainwright Building was received favorably by critics, though the Daily American Republic wrote that the design was the subject of "unfavorable criticism" in its day. A 1956 poll in Architectural Record magazine named the Wainwright Building one of the United States' most significant 19th-century commercial buildings, tied with Sullivan's Carson Pirie Scott flagship store in Chicago. In explaining the poll ranking, modernist architect Philip Johnson wrote that the building "turns out more and more to be the prototype of all contemporary office buildings". Another 1976 poll of American architects ranked it one of the country's best designs.

==== Architectural commentary ====
Upon completion, the St. Louis Post-Dispatch called the structure a "fine business edifice", and the Lake Sun Leader called it an indicator of "the business acumen and public enterprise of the Wainwrights". The Street Railway Journal said the Wainwright Building was one of several structures in St. Louis that gave the city's downtown "a solid and substantial character and an air of prosperity". Architect Frank Lloyd Wright, then one of Adler & Sullivan's draftsmen, called the Wainwright Building "the very first human expression of a tall steel office-building as Architecture"; the Chicago Tribune later wrote that Wright's commentary might have influenced public perceptions of Sullivan as a designer of "tall buildings". In 1908, The Architectural Review wrote that the exterior made no attempt to appear as a traditional load-bearing wall, and that the ornamentation was eye-catching. Redbook wrote that, with the Wainwright Building, St. Louis had taken a chance with Sullivan's architecture at a time when his "form follows function" philosophy was ridiculed.

Retrospectively, Willard Connely wrote that "the expressiveness in the 'frontal divisions' of the Wainwright was unmistaken, and unmistakable". The Post-Dispatch called it "one of the classics in the early skyscraper idiom", and Paul Goldberger wrote that the facade design was uniquely suitable for a tall building. Chicago History magazine called the structure an example of Sullivan's "masterful use of terracotta". One writer for The Wall Street Journal said in 1983 that the "visual incantations" of the foliate spandrels contrasted with the vertical lines of the piers, and another called it "one of the most human examples of that American invention, the steel-frame skyscraper". Pierson and Jordy wrote in 1986 that the ornamentation had "a clarity, a comprehensiveness, and an individuality" seldom seen elsewhere. After the building's centennial, the Post-Dispatch wrote that the building "seems a made thing", in contrast to the massive appearance of contemporary skyscrapers, and that the color looked best on rainy days. The American Scholar magazine wrote in 2012, "Unquestionably it possesses 'the force and power of altitude.'"

Historian Carl W. Condit described the structure as having "a strong, vigorously articulated base supporting a screen that constitutes a vivid image of powerful upward movement". The emphasis of vertical decorative details was criticized by observers who believed that the building's purpose was primarily functional, not symbolic. Morrison wrote that the building's design had some purely decorative elements, such as the frieze, and wrote that the vertical facade and flat roof were incongruous. Morrison nonetheless felt that the building represented a significant improvement upon its contemporaries such as the Temperance Temple, the New York World Building, or the New York Life Building of Kansas City. Detractors also regarded the non-structural piers as superfluous, as they served only an esthetic purpose, though the Architectural Review saw this as a necessary concession to preserve the facade's unity. Robert Twombly wrote that the second floor, despite being an office story, was treated as part of the base, so the form did not necessarily follow the function.

==== Redevelopment commentary ====
When the building was proposed for redevelopment in the 1970s, Ada Louise Huxtable contrasted the Wainwright Building's preservation with the partial demolition of Grace Church in New York, and she praised the redevelopment as a contrast to the "rampant mediocrity" surrounding it. The Christian Science Monitor wrote that the building's preservation, beyond just saving a world-famous building, would "serve as a precedent and prototype for many American downtowns".

Following the renovation in 1981, Goldberger wrote that the building "shines as a jewel in this otherwise drab downtown" and called the annex "respectful, but not slavish", and Donald Hoffmann of the Kansas City Star wrote that the annex was deferential to the original. Thomas Hine of The Philadelphia Inquirer wrote, "The Wainwright is a highly ornamented tower, the annex is a stripped-down village." By contrast, architectural professor Buford Pickens wrote that the annex's design was unwelcoming, with bleak courtyards and nondescript entrances. The Los Angeles Times, writing about the American historic preservation movement overall, called the Wainwright Building one of "many great buildings [that] have been saved" following the demolition of New York's original Pennsylvania Station in the 1960s. The New York Times cited the Wainwright redevelopment as one of several "architectural treasures" preserved in St. Louis before preservation funding was diminished in the 1980s.

=== Architectural influence ===
==== On subsequent Adler & Sullivan work ====
The Guaranty Building in Buffalo (pictured) copied the Wainwright design with some refinements.

The Wainwright Building was Adler & Sullivan's first steel-frame structure. It was the first of ten designs they completed in St. Louis, which became the city with the second-highest concentration of their work, after Chicago. Other local developers, impressed by the Wainwright design, hired the firm in the belief that an Adler & Sullivan building would bolster their own reputations. Several other Sullivan buildings in St. Louis were commissioned by Ellis Wainwright himself, including the Wainwright Tomb for Ellis and his wife, one of three tombs Sullivan designed during his career. Adler & Sullivan worked on other major structures such as the Schiller Building in Chicago, the Guaranty Building in Buffalo, and the World's Columbian Exposition structures in Chicago. Sullivan ultimately executed 200 designs during his lifetime, of which the Wainwright Building was one of about three dozen that survived in the late 20th century. In his later years, Sullivan fell out of fame after dissolving his partnership with Adler and getting into disputes with Wright; he and his work were not rediscovered until the mid-20th century.

Sullivan biographer Hugh Morrison wrote that the Wainwright design constituted "a more or less standard treatment of the skyscraper" that was copied across multiple designs. The Guaranty Building, in particular, largely copied the Wainwright design with some refinements, and Sullivan himself regarded them as sister structures. Both buildings have many characteristics in common, such as corner lots, U-shaped layouts, exterior articulation, and floor heights. The two buildings share many of the ideals espoused in "The Tall Office Building Artistically Considered". The Guaranty Building's deviations from the Wainwright design primarily arise from its smaller lot area, greater height, and more extensive use of terracotta.

Sullivan's use of identical primary and secondary piers was carried over into the Guaranty Building, and he further refined this design technique at the Bayard–Condict Building in New York City, where the non-structural piers were reduced to mullions. His use of organic ornamentation influenced several of his later works, such as the Bayard–Condict Building, the Gage Group Buildings, a country club, and the Carson Pirie Scott store, and the Wainwright Building's motifs were copied in the Fraternity Temple and the Schiller Building. The Wainwright Building's tenth-story frieze was the first of many Sullivan designed for his buildings. This copying of design features led Wright to describe Sullivan, his mentor, as "essentially a man of one building".

==== On other early skyscrapers ====
The Wainwright Building has been described as representing a major innovation in American architecture. It was not the first early skyscraper, as taller buildings had previously been built, nor was it the first high-rise to use a structural steel frame. However, the Wainwright Building was among the earliest to express its structural function on its exterior, specifically through the use of piers. The New York Times wrote that the building "demonstrate[s] the earliest and highest fusion of the new structure and style" and called it the "first artistically successful modern skyscraper". Morrison wrote that the building "was the first successful solution of the architectural problem of the high building", and St. Louis Magazine wrote that the building "could be considered the first true skyscraper in spirit" because of the technical advances included in the design. Another writer said the design proved that "the tall building was no longer merely a functional container, but was an art form in its own right".

The design influenced subsequent early skyscrapers, along with offices and warehouses that used structural grids on their exteriors. The Austin American-Statesman said the Wainwright Building's impact on architecture was akin to the influence of Charles Lindbergh's solo flight Spirit of St. Louis on aviation. Another historian, Mervyn Kaufman, wrote that the building's "graceful expression of vertical unity" inspired architects for a half-century after its completion. Many later skyscrapers used a tripartite design as well, although the shafts of these buildings were decorated in a variety of styles, a dilution of Sullivan's original design intent. These included the Flatiron Building, where the base, windows, and cornice took on a Renaissance Revival design, and the Woolworth Building, whose piers were combined with Gothic Revival decorations. The Wainwright Building also influenced the design of non-skyscrapers, such as the second Busch Stadium in St. Louis. Sullivan's use of interlocking motifs in the Wainwright Building influenced his mentee Wright's works.

=== Media and landmark designations ===
The Wainwright Building was designated as a National Historic Landmark (NHL) in 1968; it is one of several Adler & Sullivan buildings to be granted NHL designation. (Note: The firm's Auditorium Building, Guaranty Building, and James Charnley House are also designated as NHLs. Other National Historic Landmarks designed by Sullivan alone include the Carson Pirie Scott Building, Bayard–Condict Building, Harold C. Bradley House, Farmers and Merchants Union Bank, Merchants' National Bank, National Farmers' Bank of Owatonna, People's Federal Savings and Loan Association, and Van Allen Building.) The building was described as "a highly influential prototype of the modern office building" in its designation report. In 1972 it was named as a St. Louis Landmark. It was one of the earliest city landmarks to be designated, with a landmark ID of 7.

The building has been detailed in several exhibits of Sullivan's work. These include exhibitions at the Museum of Modern Art, Riverside City College, the Institute of Contemporary Art, The Octagon, and multiple exhibits at the City Museum, along with a 1987 traveling show organized by the Chicago Historical Society. It was also selected as a "sort of hero" in a 1939 documentary produced by the Museum of Modern Art, which hosted an exhibit that year with photographs of the building. In May 2013 it was listed in the PBS series 10 That Changed America as one of "10 Buildings That Changed America". The episode cited the Wainwright Building as "the first skyscraper that truly looked the part", in part because of Sullivan, the "Father of Skyscrapers". The design features also inspired some pieces of jewelry.

== See also ==
- List of tallest buildings in St. Louis
- National Register of Historic Places listings in St. Louis, Missouri
- List of National Historic Landmarks in Missouri
