= Ellis Wainwright =

American businessman (1850–1924)

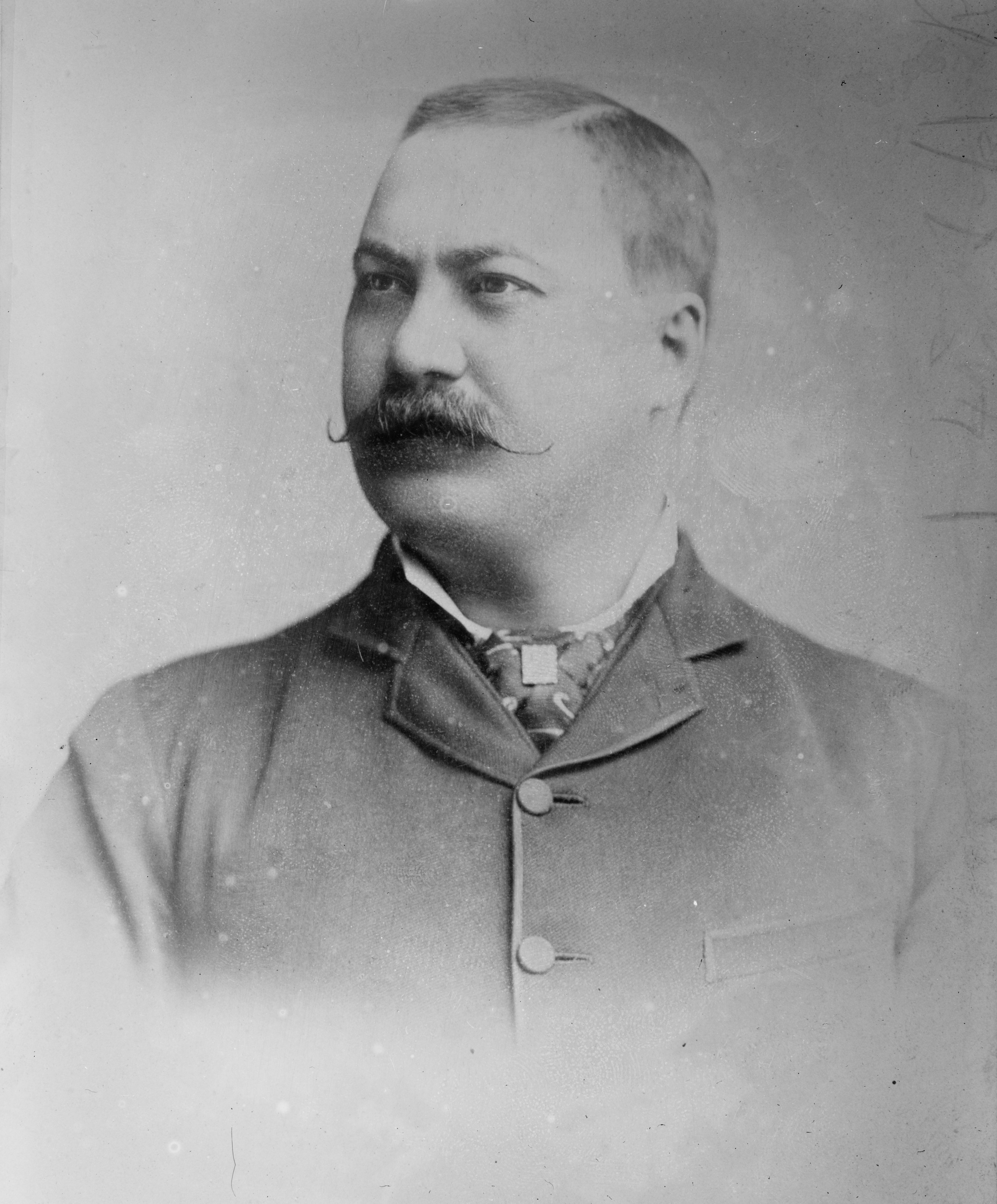
- Born: August 3, 1850; Godfrey, Illinois, US
- Died: November 6, 1924 (aged 74); St. Louis, Missouri, US
- Occupation: Capitalist

Ellis Wainwright (August 3, 1850 – November 6, 1924) was an American capitalist, brewer, art collector and socialite from St. Louis, Missouri. He was President of the St. Louis Brewing Company and Director of the St. Louis and Suburban Company. He is best known for the Wainwright Building in downtown St. Louis, which was one of the first skyscrapers in the world and one of the most important office buildings of the period.

== Biography ==
Wainwright was born on August 3, 1850, and although the family hailed from Godfrey, Illinois, he grew up in nearby St. Louis, where he also spent much of his adult life. The son of a prominent brewer and building contractor, an English immigrant Samuel Wainwright and his wife Catherine Dorothy, Wainwright was an important figure in railway development in the region. In 1889, he consolidated his father's Wainwright Brewery Company (in which Samuel Wainwright had successfully doubled the profits) with a brewing syndicate and established the St. Louis Brewing Association.

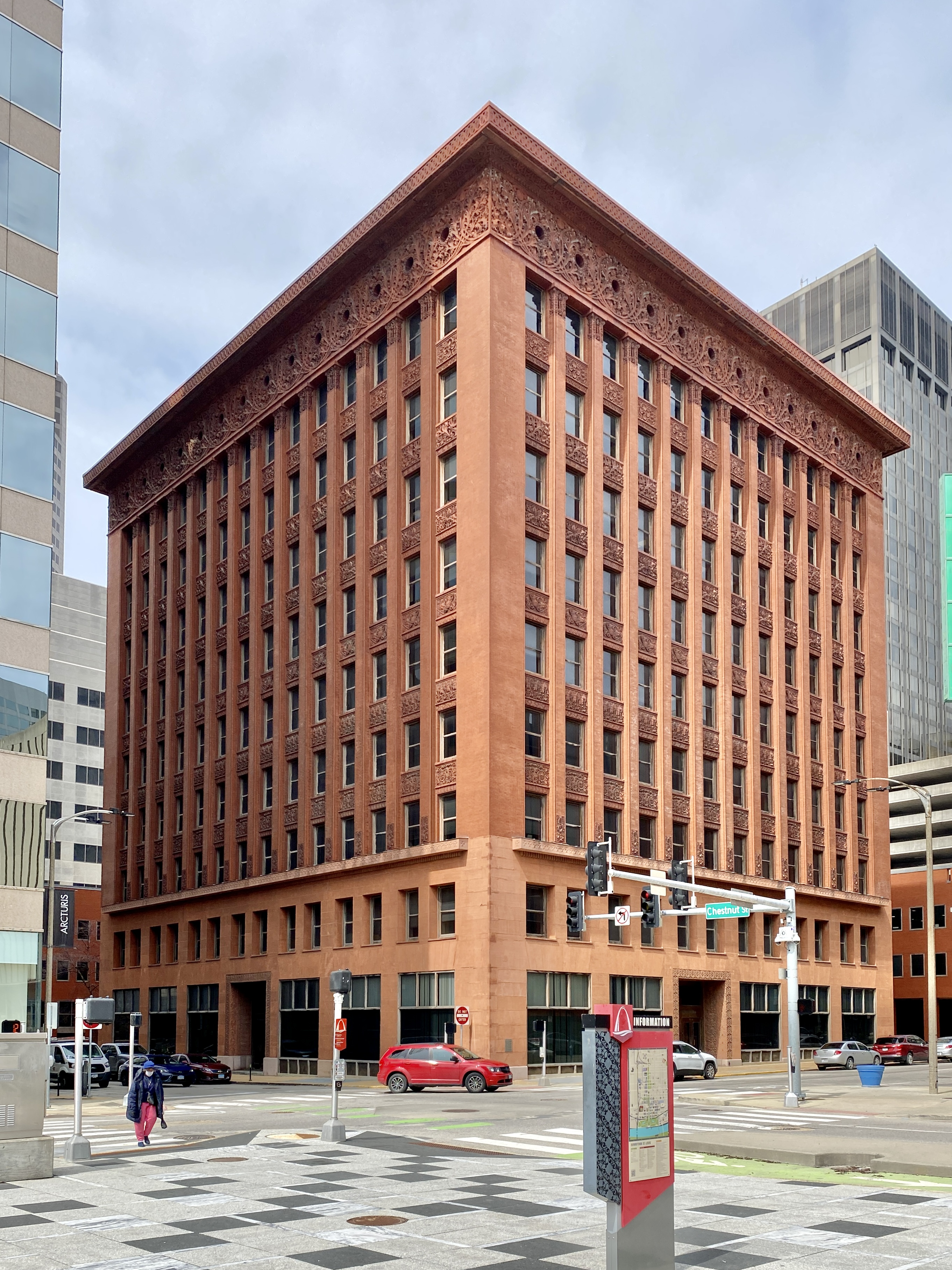
Wainwright Building

Wainwright visited Europe in the summer of 1890. Meanwhile his plans for the Wainwright Building, named in his honor, and designed by Dankmar Adler and Louis Sullivan were put into effect. It was to be built on the corner of Seventh and Chestnut streets in downtown St. Louis on a plot of land which had been purchased by his mother Catherine. On November 7, 1890, a drawing by Charles K. Ramsey showing how the building would look appeared in the Globe-Democrat. It was a nine- or ten-storey red-terracotta cuboid structure, being 114 feet by 127 feet, and held 225 offices when completed in 1892. On November 11, 1890, Sullivan received planning permission to build the office building which would cost over £500,000 (US$17,916,667 in 2025 dollars). The building was among the first skyscrapers in the world and is described as "a highly influential prototype of the modern office building" by the National Register of Historic Places. Architect Frank Lloyd Wright called the Wainwright Building "the very first human expression of a tall steel office-building as Architecture."

Before the building was completed, Wainwright's wife Charlotte died of peritonitis, aged just 34. Wainwright commissioned Louis Sullivan to erect the great Wainwright Tomb for her within the Bellefontaine Cemetery, in which his parents and he would also later be buried.

In 1902, Wainwright was indicted for conspiracy to bribe members of the state legislature in the Suburban Railway boodle scandal and subsequently became a fugitive in Paris. He was said to have co-signed a $75,000 bank loan for the bribe money.

In 1904, his name appeared in The Shame of the Cities, a muckraking exposé by Lincoln Steffens which gave details of Wainwright's shady dealings and other public corruption within the United States.

== Death ==
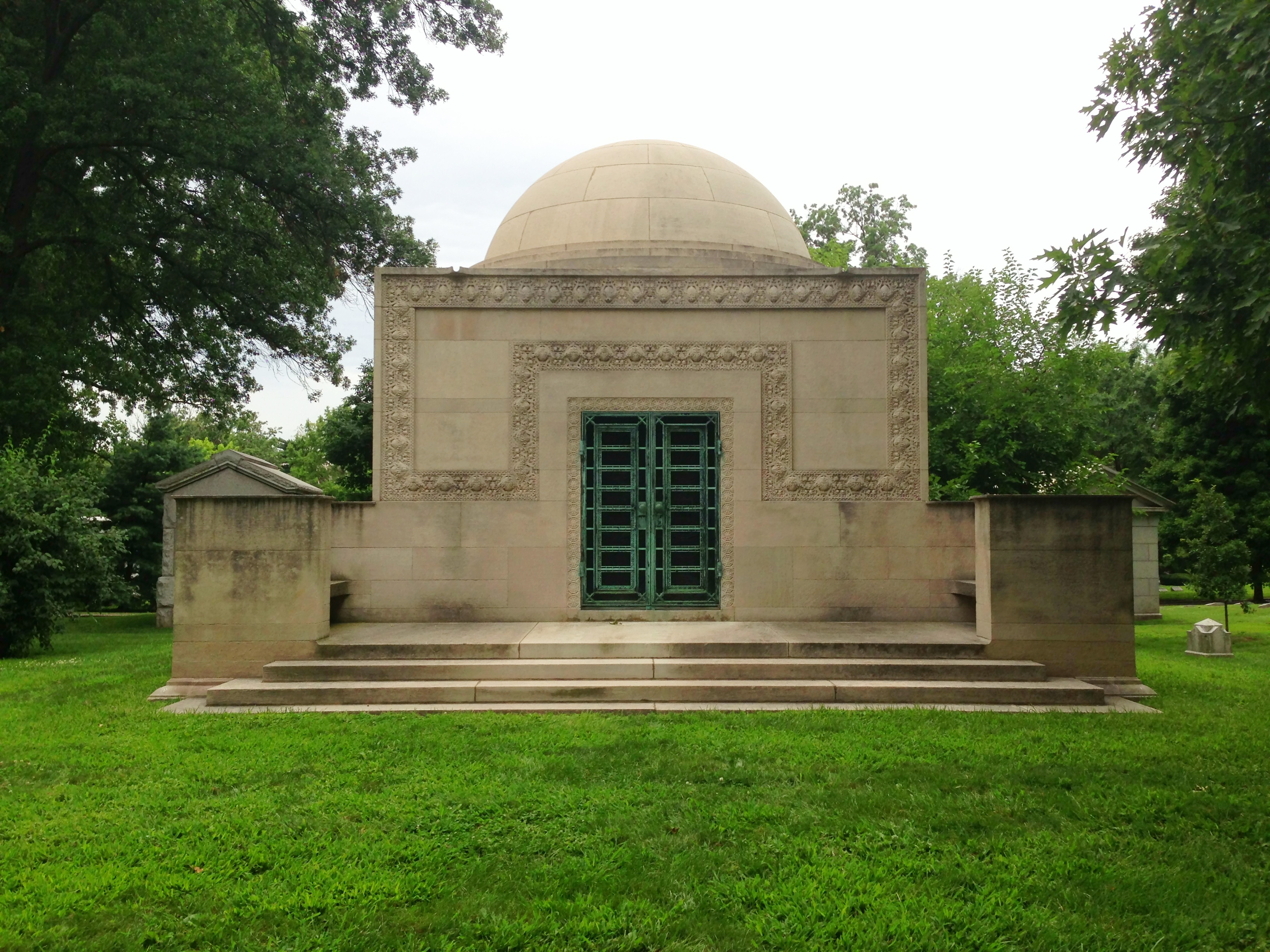
Wainwright Tomb

After over 20 years in Paris, with health failing, Wainwright returned to St. Louis and died on November 6, 1924. He is buried in the Louis Sullivan-designed Wainwright Tomb in Bellefontaine Cemetery, commissioned by Wainwright after the death of his wife; it was listed on the National Register of Historic Places on June 15, 1970, and became a St. Louis Landmark in 1971. Like several other grand tombs within the cemetery, the tomb has been described as "over-the-top" and either "reflecting the atmosphere of the times", or revealing that "ego prevails regardless of the time frame" and that "wealthy businessmen and families attempted to remain as large in death as they were in life". The tomb is a domed cubic building with walls of concrete covered in limestone on the exterior. On the northeast (front) side of the tomb is the entrance with a double-leafed bronze grill and double-doors. The sides of the tomb each have windows, also covered in bronze grills. The interior of the tomb has two burial slabs and a mosaic floor and ceiling. The Wainwright Tomb has been described as "the most sensitive and the most graceful of Sullivan's tombs" and as "one of Sullivan's masterpieces." After Wainwright's death, an endowment was established that provided for the reconstruction or renovation of the tomb in case of earthquake or vandalism.
