= William A. Glasner House =

Historic house in Illinois, United States

- U.S. National Register of Historic Places
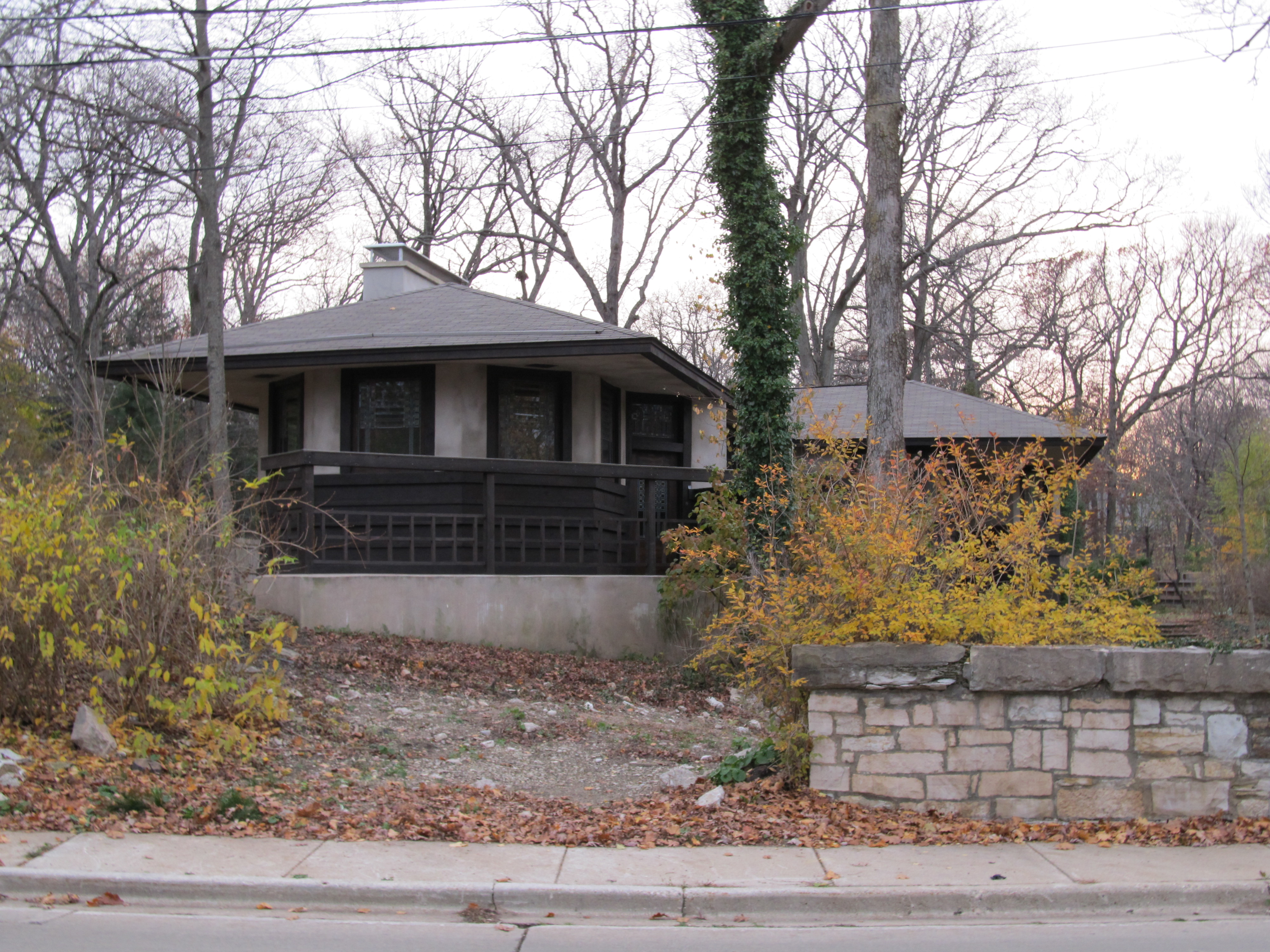
- The house in 2011

- Location within Illinois
- Location: 850 Sheridan Rd., Glencoe, Illinois
- Coordinates: 42°8′29″N 87°45′19″W
- Built: 1905
- Architect: Frank Lloyd Wright
- Architectural style: Prairie School
- NRHP reference No.: 05000105
- Added to NRHP: February 28, 2005

The William A. Glasner House is a Frank Lloyd Wright-designed Prairie School home in Glencoe, Illinois, United States, in 1905. Glasner led his sister, Emma Pettit, to Wright to design the Pettit Memorial Chapel as a memorial to her deceased husband, Dr. William H. Pettit.

After the house was threatened with demolition by a real estate developer, the Frank Lloyd Wright Building Conservancy helped locate a conservation-minded buyer who ultimately purchased the house. It is a 4,300-square-foot (400 m^{2}), four-bedroom, three-bathroom house on a 1-acre (0.40 ha) lot. Jack Reed bought the house in 2003 for $1.5 million and spent $2.5 million restoring it.

== See also ==
- List of Frank Lloyd Wright works
- National Register of Historic Places listings in Cook County, Illinois
