= Martin Ryerson Tomb =

Historic site in Cook County, Illinois

- Martin Ryerson Mausoleum
- U.S. Historic district – Contributing property
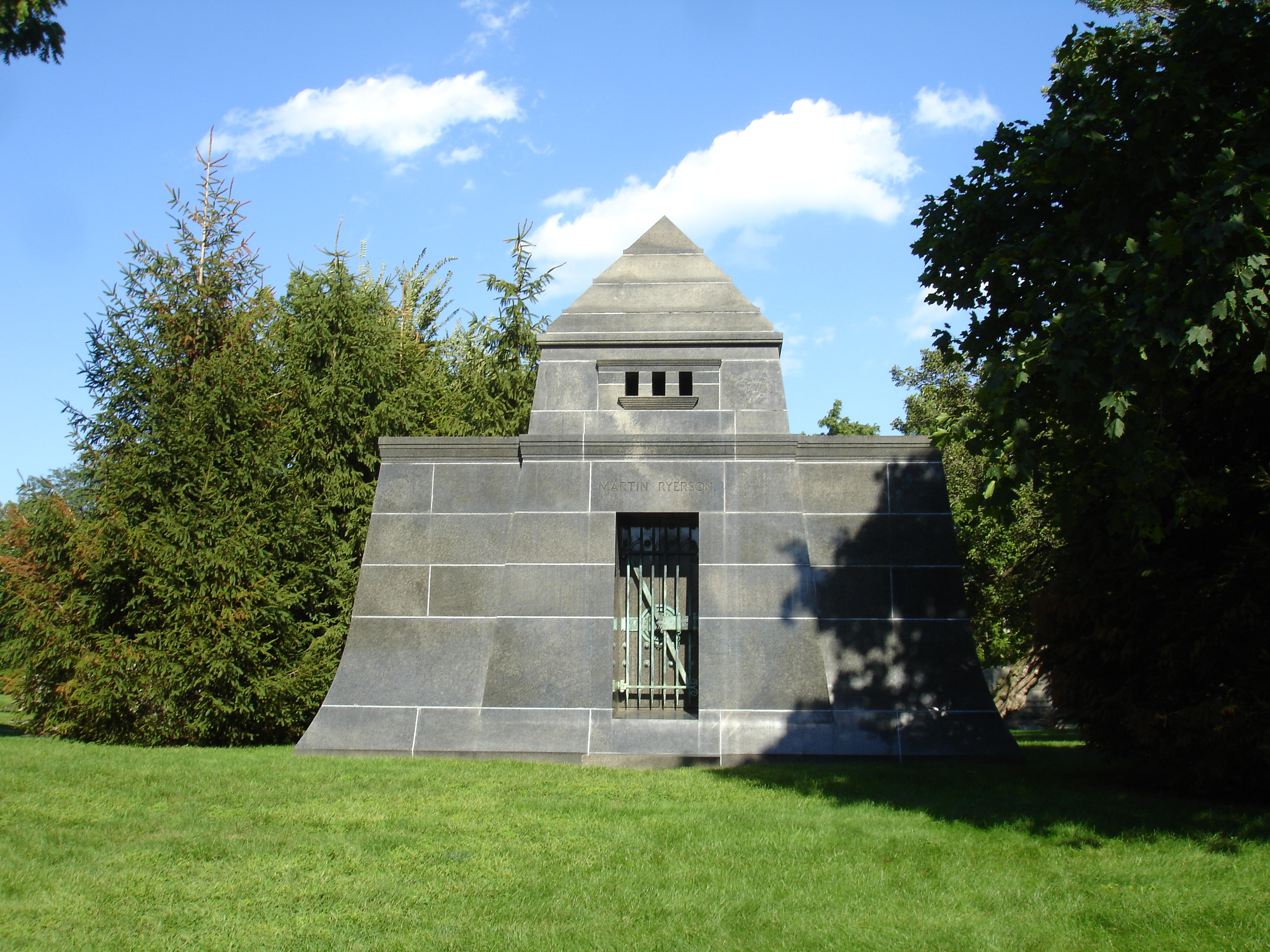
- The front elevation of the Martin Ryerson Tomb.
- Location: Chicago, Illinois, United States
- Built: 1889
- Architect: Louis Sullivan
- Architectural style: Egyptian Revival architecture
- Part of: Graceland Cemetery (ID00001628)
- Added to NRHP: January 18, 2001

The Martin Ryerson Tomb is an Egyptian Revival architecture style mausoleum designed by Louis Sullivan and completed in 1889. It is in the historic Graceland Cemetery in Chicago, Illinois, United States.

== History ==
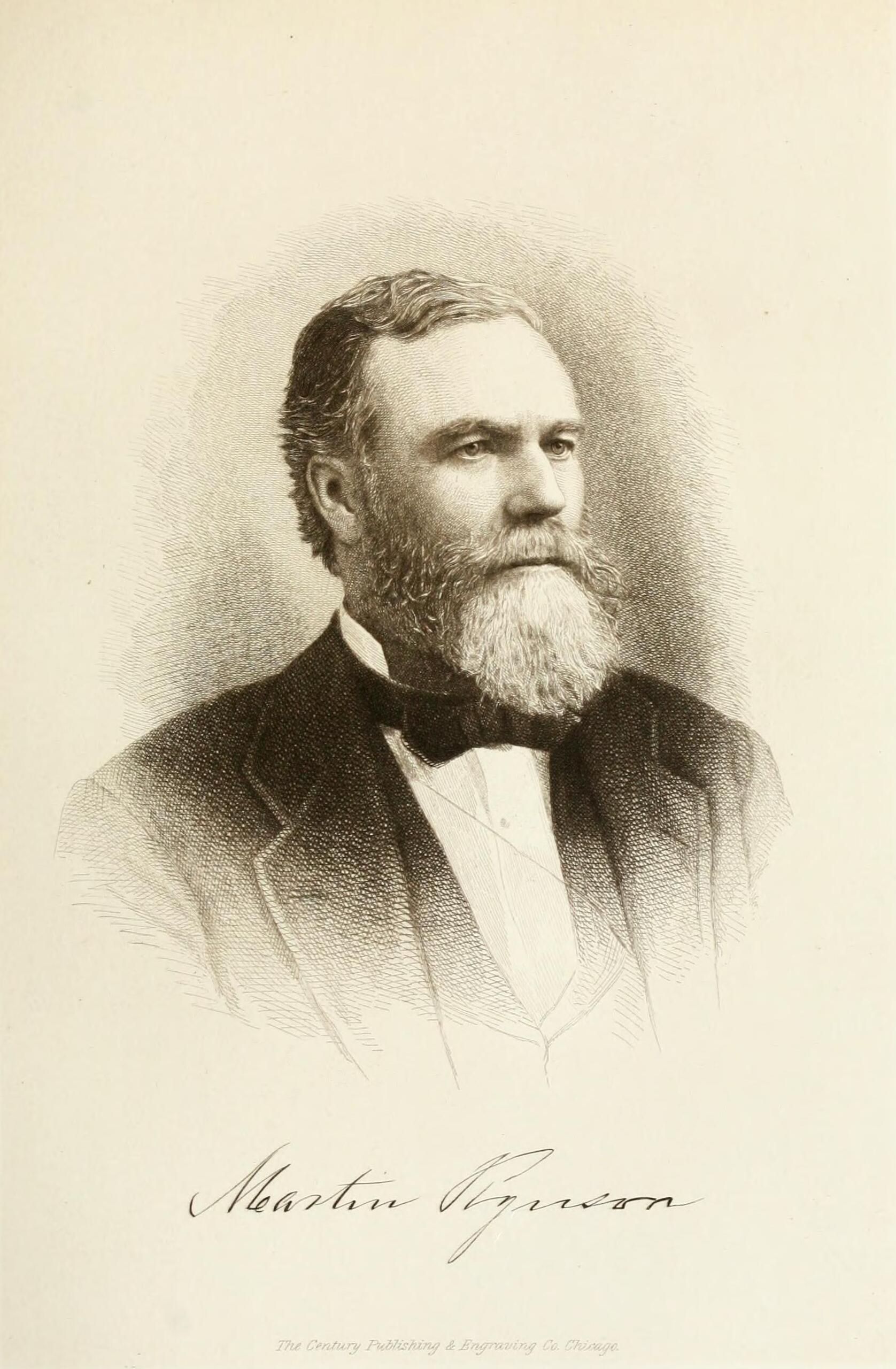
Martin Ryerson (1818–1887)

Martin Ryerson was a wealthy Chicago lumber baron and real estate speculator. He lived from 1818 to 1887 and during his lifetime he, and his son Martin Ryerson, Jr., commissioned several Chicago works by architect Louis H. Sullivan. The Ryerson Tomb was commissioned by Martin Ryerson, Jr. in 1887, and completed by Sullivan, lead designer at Adler & Sullivan, in 1889. The Ryerson Tomb is in the Lakeside section of Chicago's Graceland Cemetery, near the intersection of cemetery roads Main, Lake and Fairview Avenue.

== Architecture ==
The Martin Ryerson Tomb was designed by acclaimed architect Louis H. Sullivan in an Egyptian Revival style. Sullivan's design melds two different types of Egyptian-style buildings, the pyramid and the mastaba. The base of the tomb building is the slant-walled mastaba which features three windows. The mausoleum is constructed from large blocks of highly polished Quincy granite, and was inspired by Egyptian funerary traditions. The tomb's exterior contains no Egyptian symbols but has a door cutting directly through its center as well as an austere fillet cornice. The tomb's roof is topped with a tower which in turn is topped with a stepped pyramid. Uniquely, the tomb evokes Egyptian precedents through its dark, massive form, instead of the more typical reliance on Egyptian-style ornamentation. Inside the mausoleum is one of Sullivan's trademark arches, the arch frames a Sullivan-designed, but unsigned, bust of Ryerson. The Ryerson Mausoleum is one of three tombs that Louis Sullivan designed during his career. The Getty Tomb, completed one year after the 1889 Ryerson Tomb, is also located in Graceland Cemetery. The other Sullivan-designed tomb, the Wainwright Tomb, is in St. Louis, Missouri.

== Significance ==
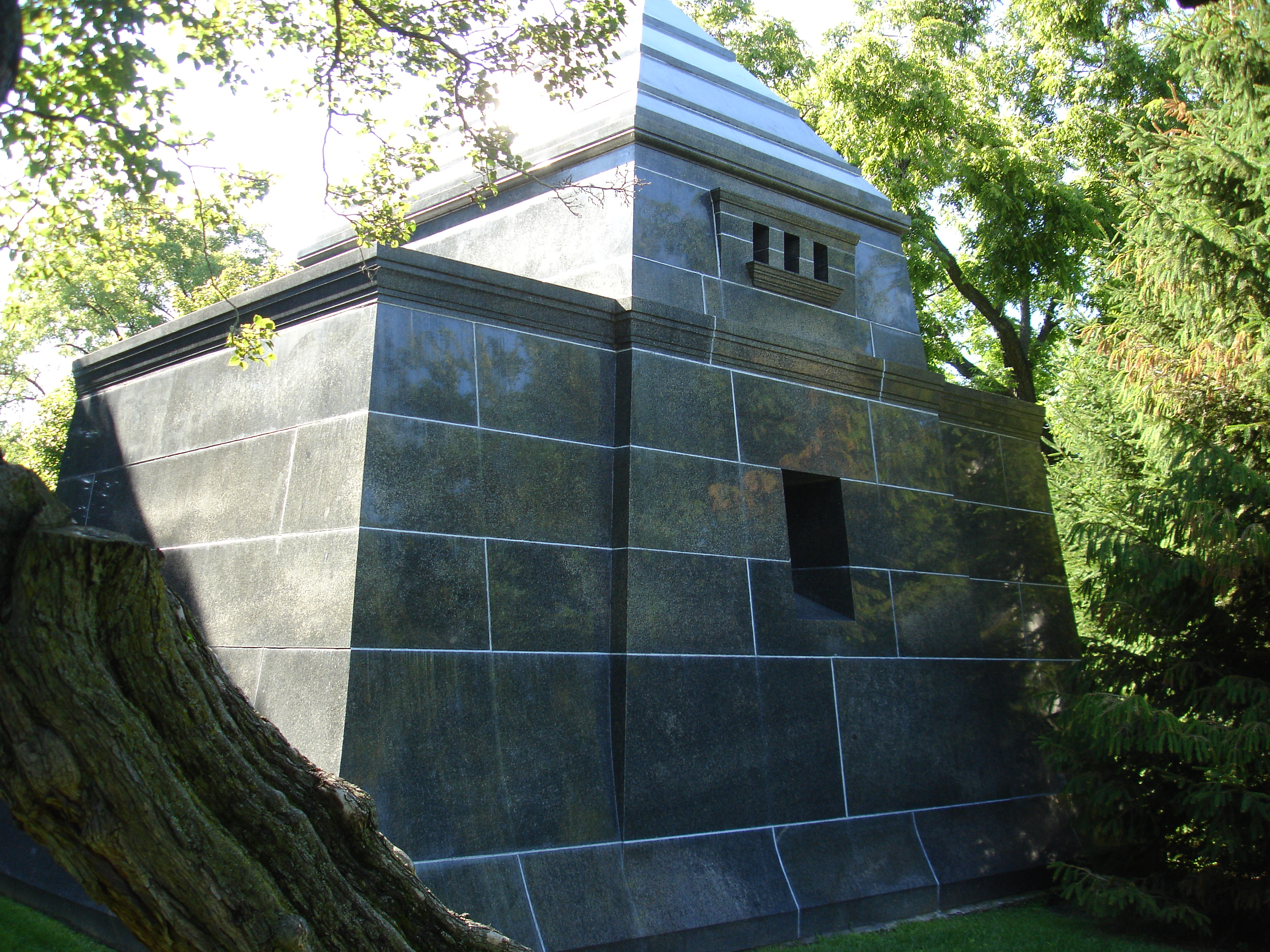
The polished black granite reflects the cemetery landscape.

The Ryerson Tomb is unique among Egyptian Revival tombs owing to its lack of overt, exterior Egyptian decoration. In a category all its own, the Ryerson Tomb is among the most important Egyptian Revival works in the United States. The Ryerson Tomb is a contributing member of the Graceland Cemetery National Register of Historic Places listing.

== See also ==
- Getty Tomb
- Wainwright Tomb
