= Wainwright Tomb =

Historic site in St. Louis, Missouri

- U.S. National Register of Historic Places
- St. Louis Landmark
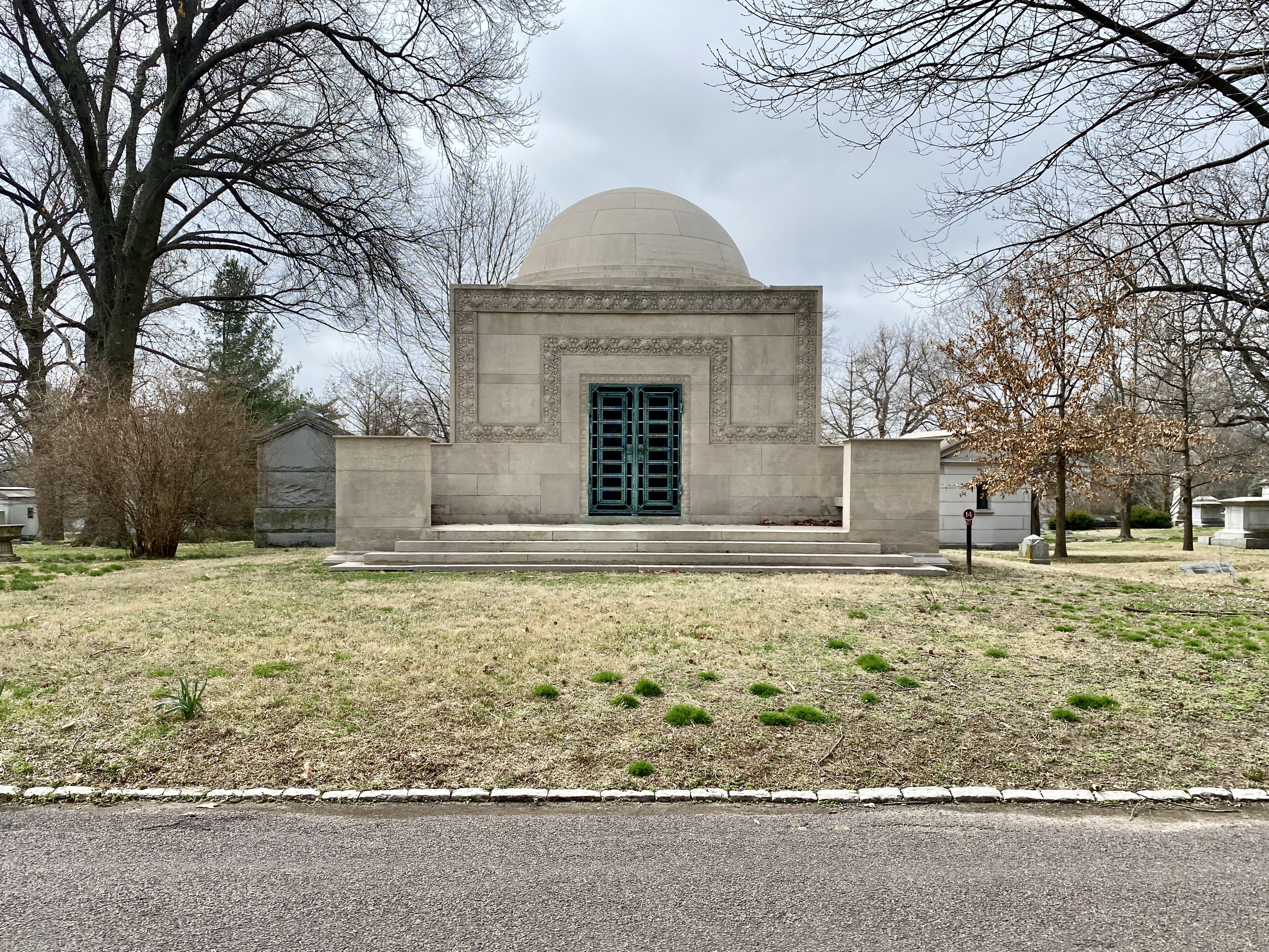
- Wainwright Tomb

- Location within St. Louis Location within Missouri Location within the United States
- Location: Bellefontaine Cemetery; 4947 W. Florissant Ave. St. Louis, MO, United States
- Coordinates: 38°41′20″N 90°13′28″W
- Area: less than one acre
- Built: 1892
- Architect: Louis Sullivan
- Architectural style: Chicago school
- NRHP reference No.: 70000907
- Added to NRHP: June 15, 1970

The Wainwright Tomb is a mausoleum located in Bellefontaine Cemetery in St. Louis, Missouri. Originally constructed for Charlotte Dickson Wainwright in 1892, the tomb also contains the remains of her husband, Ellis Wainwright. The mausoleum was designed by noted Chicago school architect Louis Sullivan, who also designed the Wainwright Building for Ellis Wainwright.

== History ==
Shortly before the construction of the Wainwright Building in Downtown St. Louis (itself now a National Historic Landmark), the "young and beautiful" wife of wealthy St. Louis brewery owner Ellis Wainwright died. Only 34 years old when she died of peritonitis on April 15, 1891, Charlotte Augusta Dickson Wainwright was said to be the most beautiful woman in St. Louis. Wainwright commissioned Louis Sullivan to design a tomb for his wife and himself, which was completed in 1892.

In 1901, Wainwright fled the United States after being indicted for bribery, but he later returned and died in St. Louis in 1924, then was entombed with his wife. After his death, an endowment was established that provided for the reconstruction or renovation of the tomb in case of earthquake or vandalism. The tomb was listed on the National Register of Historic Places on June 15, 1970 and became a St. Louis Landmark in 1971.

== Architecture and significance ==
The tomb is a domed cubic building with walls of concrete covered in limestone on the exterior. On the northeast (front) side of the tomb is the entrance with a double-leafed bronze grill and double-doors. The sides of the tomb each have windows, also covered in bronze grills. The limestone walls are carved with floral patterns that do not repeat. The interior of the tomb has two burial slabs and a mosaic floor and ceiling. The Wainwright Tomb has significance as a work of Louis Sullivan, and it has been described as "the most sensitive and the most graceful of Sullivan's tombs" and as "one of Sullivan's masterpieces."

== See also ==
- Getty Tomb
- Ryerson Tomb
- National Register of Historic Places listings in St. Louis north and west of downtown

== Sources ==
- "National Register of Historic Places Registration Form" (PDF). National Register of Historic Places. National Park Service. June 15, 1970. Archived from the original (PDF) on October 24, 2020.
- "National Register Information System". National Register of Historic Places. National Park Service. July 9, 2010.
- "St. Louis City Cultural Resources Office". List of City Landmarks. St. Louis City.
