= Carrie Eliza Getty Tomb =

Tomb in Chicago, Illinois

- Getty Tomb
- U.S. National Register of Historic Places
- Chicago Landmark
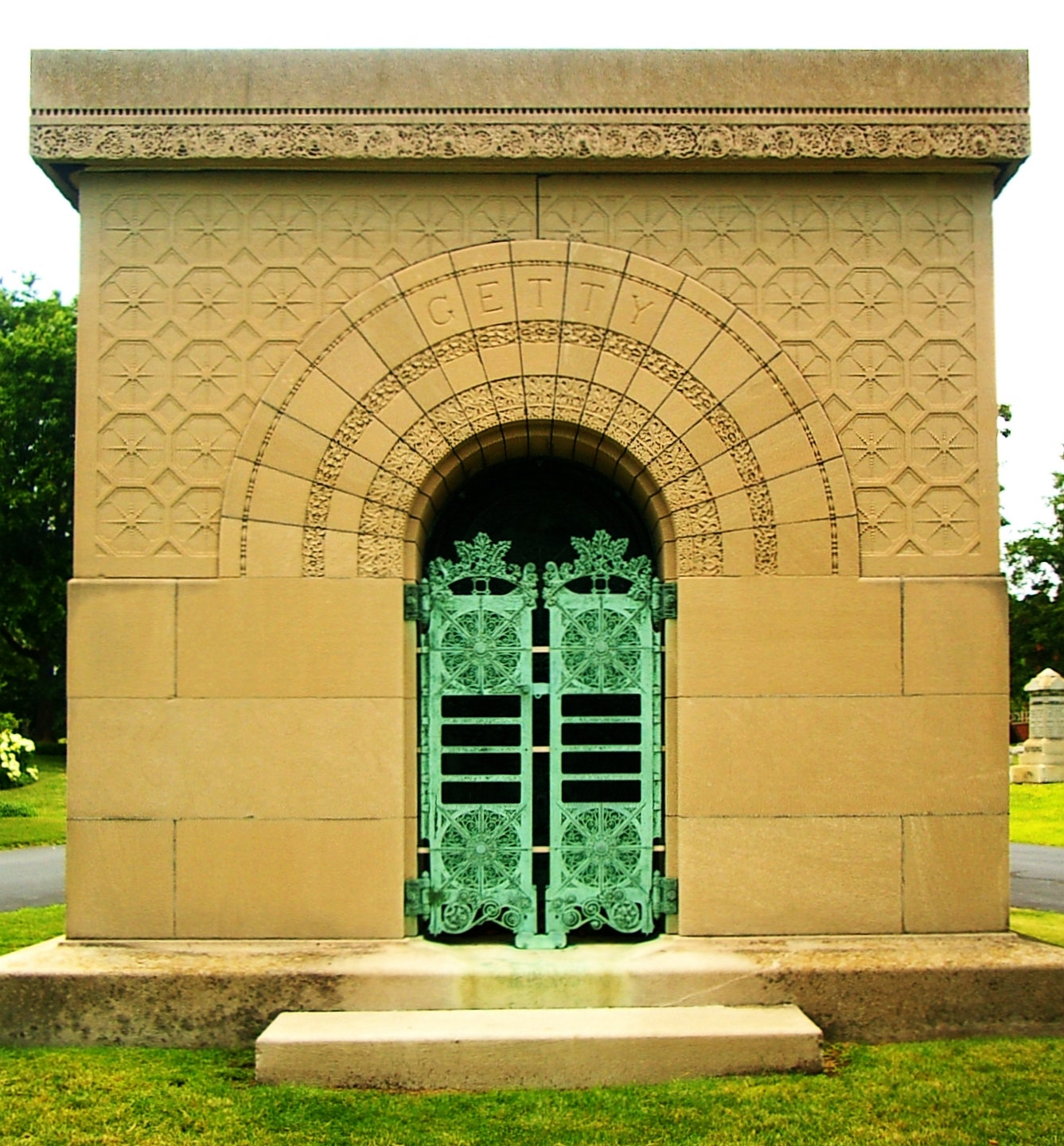
- Front entrance
- Location: Chicago, Illinois, United States
- Coordinates: 41°57′40.12″N 87°39′40.58″W
- Built: 1890
- Architect: Louis Sullivan
- NRHP reference No.: 74000750

Significant dates
- Added to NRHP: February 15, 1974
- Designated CHICL: March 10, 1971

The Carrie Eliza Getty Tomb, located in Graceland Cemetery in Chicago, Illinois, United States, was commissioned in 1890 by the lumber baron Henry Harrison Getty for his wife. It was designed by the noted American architect Louis Sullivan of the firm Adler & Sullivan. Getty became familiar with Sullivan's work from the architect's various Loop projects as well as from the mausoleum (also in Graceland) Sullivan designed for Getty's late partner, Martin Ryerson.

== History ==
The Getty Tomb has been said to be the most significant piece of architecture in Graceland cemetery and the beginning of Sullivan's involvement in the architectural style known as the Chicago School.

The tomb, which stands on its own triangular plot of land, is composed of limestone masonry construction. Roughly a cube in shape, the bottom half of the tomb is composed of large, smooth limestone blocks. The upper half is composed of a rectangular pattern of octagons, each containing an eight-pointed starburst design. The cornice is banded with smooth limestone above intricate spiraling patterns below, and the top-edge of the roofline is straight and horizontal on the front and back and scalloped in a concave fashion on the sides.

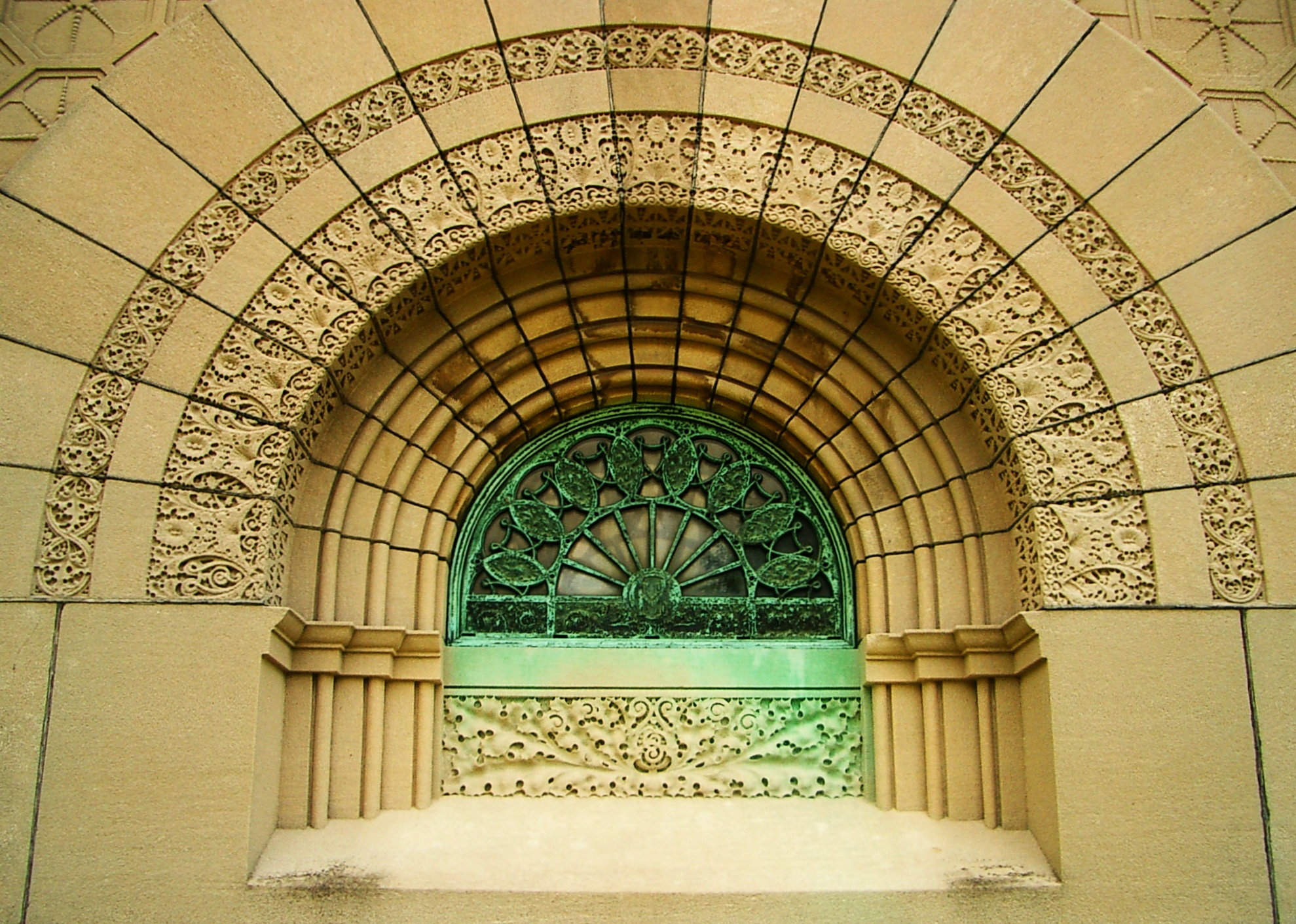
Side window

When approaching the tomb, the obvious focus is the ornate doorway. An intricately ornamented bronze gate and door, patinated green over time, are spanned by a broad semi-circular archway. The voussoirs, emanating radially in long thin wedges, share alternating plain and intricately carved concentric bands. The twin gates as well as the door behind share a combination of geometric and floral details that incorporate the starburst seen in the upper patterned walls. The three other sides of the tomb house semi-circular, bronze-clad windows that mimick the arch and door details of the front. A plaster cast of the door was exhibited at the 1900 Paris Exhibition where it won Sullivan an award.

Henry joined his wife in the tomb shortly after he died in Paris, France, on March 31, 1919 (date per his obituary in the Chicago Daily Tribune, published April 2, 1919). Their only child Alice was added in 1946. On March 10, 1971, the tomb was designated as a Chicago Landmark by the Commission on Chicago Landmarks.

== See also ==
- Martin Ryerson Tomb
- Wainwright Tomb
